= List of Greek dishes =

This is a list of notable dishes found in Greek cuisine.

== Salads, spreads, sauces ==
Name	Image	Description
Greek salad (χωριάτικη σαλάτα)		Greek salad consists of tomatoes, sliced cucumbers, onion, feta cheese, and olives (usually Kalamata olives), typically seasoned with salt and Greek mountain oregano, and dressed with olive oil. Sliced capsicum, usually green, is often added also.
Dakos (ντάκος)		Dry barley rusk, soaked in olive oil and topped with sliced tomatoes, herbs, feta cheese, and sometimes capers.
Pissara (πισάρα)		Kefalonian salad with fresh greens, sun-dried tomato, feta and pine-nuts.
Taramosalata (ταραμοσαλάτα)		Fish roe, breadcrumbs, olive oil, lemon juice.
Tirokafteri (τυροκαυτερή)		Sometimes written 'tyrokafteri'. A spread or dip of feta cheese, roasted red peppers, and (rarely) garlic. Can be spicy hot or mild.
Tzatziki (τζατζίκι)		Dip made from combining yogurt, cucumber, and (usually) garlic. Dill is sometimes added according to people's tastes. Olive oil is typically added.
Pasta elias (πάστα ελιάς)		Dip made from chopped olives, caper, salt and garlic; very similar to tapenade.
Skordalia (σκορδαλιά)		A purée that typically accompanies fried cod (called bakaliaros or μπακαλιάρος) and in some cases, salads. The main ingredients are potato, garlic, olive oil and vinegar.
Salata koliandrou (σαλάτα κόλιανδρου)		Collard salad
Saganaki (σαγανάκι)		A variety of dishes (best known for an appetiser of pan-fried cheese, such as halloumi) prepared in a small frying pan (sagani).

== Breads ==
Name	Image	Description
Daktyla (δάκτυλα)		'Country' or 'village' bread.
Eptazymo/Eftazymo (εφτάζυμο)		Bread made from chick pea.
Fogatsa (φογάτσα)		Sweet bread from Corfu.
Kritsini (κριτσίνι)		Breadsticks, grissini.
Koulouri (κουλούρι)		A version of simit
Lagana (λαγάνα)		Flatbread traditionally baked for Clean Monday, the first day of the Great Lent. Formerly unleavened, but nowadays more commonly leavened.
Paximadi (παξιμάδι)		Dried bread prepared with whole wheat, chick pea or barley flour.
Stafidopsomo (σταφιδόψωμο)		Raisin bread.
Zea (ζέα)		Bread made from farro ("zea")

== Appetizers and coldcuts ==
Name	Image	Description
Apáki (απάκι)		Cretan smoked pork (or chicken) served cold.
Avgotaracho (αυγοτάραχο)		Produced mainly in Missolonghi and western Greece.
Antzougies (αντζούγιες)		Salty anchovies.
Bakaliaros (μπακαλιάρος)		Often fried in batter and served with skordalia dip.
Fava (φάβα)		Split pea.
Florina peppers (πιπεριές Φλωρίνης)		Roasted red bell peppers dressed with olive oil and vinegar, often stuffed with such things as feta cheese and herbs.
Fried squid (καλαμαράκια τηγανητά)		Batter-coated, deep fried squid, served with salt and lemon.
Fouska spinialo (φούσκα σπινιάλο)		A sea fig (fouska), preserved in seawater. A popular meze in Kalymnos.
Garides (γαρίδες)		Shrimp
Dolmadakia (ντολμαδάκια)		Stuffed vine leaves with rice. From the Turkish dolma (to fill).
Grilled eggplants (ψητές μελιντζάνες)		Can be also fried.
Kolokythoanthoi (κολοκυθοανθοί/κολοκυθοκορφάδες)		Fried zucchini flowers, often stuffed with rice and various herbs and spices.
Kolokythakia Tiganitá (κολοκυθάκια τηγανιτά)		Fried zucchini
Loutza (λούτζα/λούζα)		Cured pork tenderloin.
Lakerda (λακέρδα)		Pickled bonito eaten as a meze
Loukaniko (χωριάτικο λουκάνικο)		Sausage made from pork or lamb, typically flavored with orange zest or leeks.
Noumboulo (νούμπουλο)		Corfiot pork tenderloin
Octopus (χταπόδι)		Usually grilled and served as a meze or main dish. Dressed with lemon juice.
Pita (πίτα)		Several styles of pita are found all over Greece, with fillings such as cheese (τυρόπιτα), spinach (σπανακόπιτα), zucchini (κολοκυθόπιτα), greens (χορτόπιτα), minced meat (κρεατόπιτα), custard (γαλατόπιτα) etc.
Pitaroudia (πιταρούδια)		Chickpea dumpling from Rhodes and Dodecanese.
Piktí (πηχτή)		Pork charcuterie
Safridia (σαφρίδια/σκουμπρί)		Mackerel is a fish high in oils and as it is grilled, it has a hint of a smoky flavour.
Patsavouropita/Patsavoura (Πατσαβουρόπιτα/Πατσαβούρα)		phyllo pastry pie with a |spinach and cheese filling but is made to look messy or creased the dough.
Spanakopita or spanakotiropita (σπανακόπιτα, σπανακοτυρόπιτα)		A phyllo pastry pie with a spinach and cheese filling.
Syglino (σύγκλινο)		Pork coldcut made in Mani.
Tiropita (τυρόπιτα)		Tiropita or tyropita is a Greek layered pastry pie with a feta cheese filling.
Tomatokeftedes (τοματοκεφτέδες)		Tomato fritters.
Saganaki (σαγανάκι)		Fried cheese.

== Pitas ==
Apart from the mainstream Greek pitas, regionally can be found various different versions.

Name	Image	Description
Batzina		A pita from Thessaly without filo, with pumpkin and batzos cheese originally added
Blatsariá		A greens pita (hortopita), without filo, with cheese and corn flour. From Epirus.
Kalasouna (καλασούνα)		Onion pie from Folegandros
Kasiata (κασιάτα)		Tiropita from Epirus and Thessaly with corn flour.
Plastos (πλαστός)		A pita (hortopita) with mixed greens, plus corn flour. Found in Thessaly.
Pougia (πουγκιά)		A grilled pita, or small pies, with greens. From Rhodes.

== Soups ==
Name	Image	Description
Bourou-bourou (μπούρου-μπούρου)		Pasta soup from Corfu.
Faki (φακή)		Lentil soup usually served with vinegar and olives or smoked herring (kipper).
Fasolada (φασολάδα)		Bean soup made from beans, tomatoes, carrot, onion, celery, herbs, and olive oil.
Kotosoupa (κοτόσουπα)		Chicken soup with pieces of chicken, sometimes with a thin pasta called fides (φιδές), and often with vegetables (carrots etc.).
Hortosoupa (χορτόσουπα)		Mixed vegetable soup; may include carrot, cabbage, zucchini, onions and potato. Sometimes served with cheese or yogurt
Kintéata (κιντέατα/κινθέατα)		Nettle soup.
Manitarosoupa (μανιταρόσουπα)		Mushroom soup.
Magiritsa (μαγειρίτσα)		A soup of lamb offal thickened with avgolemono, but endives and dill are commonly added. Traditionally eaten after the midnight mass for Easter.
Patsas (πατσάς)		A tripe soup, similar to Khash (pacha).
Psarosoupa (ψαρόσουπα)		Various fish soups, often including vegetables. A well known fish soup is the Kakavia.
Regali (ρεγάλι)		Lamb soup from Mani.
Revithada (ρεβυθάδα)		Chickpea soup. Notable is "Revithada Sifnou".
Avgolemono (αβγολέμονο)		A family of sauces and soups thickened with a mixture of egg yolk and lemon juice.

== Egg dishes and pasta ==
Name	Image	Description
Flomaria (φλωμάρια)		Type of long hilopites from Lemnos.
Gogges (γκόγκες)		Type of pasta.
Hilopites (χυλοπίτες)		Egg pasta.
Koftó makaronaki (κοφτό μακαρονάκι)		Ditalini; usually served with ground meat sauce
Makaronia/Makarounes me salsa kima (μακαρόνια με σάλσα κιμά)		Spaghetti, macaroni or other pasta with ground meat sauce
Kritharaki (κριθαράκι)		Short-cut pasta, identical to risoni. It can be served alone, as a soup (manestra) accompaniment, as part of a salad, or baked in a casserole.
Omeletta (ομελέτα)		Egg cooked with vegetables such as spinach, peppers, onions, cheese and optionally coldcuts.
Petoura/Petila (πέτουρα/πέτιλα)		Hand made egg pasta from Macedonia. Similar in shape to papardelle. Often served with tomato sauce.
Strapatsada (στραπατσάδα)		Scrambled eggs with tomato.
Skioufichta (σκιουφιχτά)		Pasta from Crete, similar in shape with fileja.
Sfougato (σφουγγάτο)		Type of omelette found on various islands; from the Byzantine Greek sphoungato (spongy).
Tsouchtí (τσουχτή)		Pasta, usually long hilopites, with egg and mizithra cheese. A dish from Mani.
Trahanas (τραχανάς)		Fermented and dried mixture of grain and yoghurt or fermented milk. In Crete is called Xinohondros.

== Vegetable dishes ==
Name	Image	Description
Anginares alla Polita (αγκινάρες αλά πολίτα)		Artichokes with olive oil, onion, carrots and potatoes in casserole.
Arakas me aginares (αρακάς με αγκινάρες)		Green peas with artichokes.
Briám (μπριάμ)		Baked ratatouille of summer vegetables based on sliced potatoes and zucchini in olive oil. Usually includes eggplant, tomatoes, onions, and herbs and seasonings.
Fasolakia (φασολάκια)		Fresh green beans stewed in tomato sauce. Sometimes includes potatoes, carrots, or zucchini.
Gigandes plaki (γίγαντες πλακί)		Baked beans with tomato sauce and herbs. Often made spicy with various peppers.
Grilled vegetables (ψητά λαχανικά)		Light meal.
Horta (χόρτα)		Boiled greens, usually served with olive oil and lemon. Sometimes served with boiled potatoes or bread.
Lachanorizo (λαχανόριζο)		Cabbage with rice
Prasorizo (πρασόρυζο)		Leeks and rice stew cooked in lemon juice and olive oil.
Sparagia (σπαράγκια)		Boiled asparagus.
Spanakorizo (σπανακόρυζο)		Spinach and rice stew cooked in lemon juice and olive oil.
Tsigaridia (τσιγαρίδια)		Greens found mainly on the Ionian Islands.
Tsigareli (τσιγαρέλι)		Cabbage with fresh tomato, red spicy peppers, potatoes and herbs like dill and parsley. A dish from Corfu.
Tsouknidopita (τσουκνιδόπιτα)		Nettle pie with filo pastry, (sheep's milk) butter and feta cheese
Yemista (γεμιστά)		Baked stuffed vegetables. Usually tomatoes, peppers, or other vegetables such as potato and zucchini, hollowed out and baked with a rice and herb filling. Minced meat can also be used in the filling.

== Meat and fish dishes ==
Name	Image	Description
Baked lamb with potatoes (αρνί στο φούρνο με πατάτες)		A common Greek dish. There are many regional variations with additional ingredients.
Bogana (μπογάνα)		Slow cooked lamb or goat meat with potatoes and tomatoes, from the region of Argolis.
Bifteki (μπιφτέκι)		Grilled rounded beef, made from minced meat, but other meat (chicken, turkey) can also be used.
Brizola (μπριζόλα)		Pork or beef steak
Bourdeto (μπουρδέτο/μπουργέτο)		Fish dish (rarely meat) from Ionian islands and western Greece.
Brantada (μπραντάδα)		Fish dish of the Cyclades. It is similar to the Brandade.
Giouvetsi (γιουβέτσι)		Baked lamb in a clay pot with kritharaki (a Greek pasta identical to risoni or orzo)
Gyros (γύρος)		Roasted and sliced meat (usually pork or chicken, rarely beef or lamb) on a turning spit, typically served with sauces like tzatziki and garnishes (tomato, onions) on pita bread (a popular fast food in Greece and Cyprus).
Kotopoulo me ryzi (κοτόπουλο με ρύζι)		Chicken with rice
Kotopoulo methismeno (μεθυσμένο κοτόπουλο)		Chicken marinated in alcohol (usually ouzo or beer)
Kreatopita (κρεατόπιτα)		A meat pie using lamb, goat, or pork mince (or a combination thereof) with rice and a light tomato sauce wrapped in pastry kneaded with white wine. Popular dish on the island of Kefalonia.
Kleftiko (κλέφτικο)		Literally meaning of the klephts, also called "Exochikó", this Greek dish is lamb slow-baked on the bone, first marinated in garlic and lemon juice, originally cooked in a pit oven. It is often baked with potatoes.
Kokkinisto (κοκκινιστό)		"Kokkinisto" means 'reddened', and is a family of meat stews with tomatoes.
Kokoretsi (κοκορέτσι)		A dish of the Balkans, Turkey and Azerbaijan consisting of lamb or goat intestines wrapped around seasoned offal, including sweetbreads, hearts, lungs, or kidneys, and typically grilled; a variant consists of chopped innards cooked on a griddle.
Kontosouvli (κοντοσούβλι)		Similar to the Cypriot Souvla. Large pieces of meat cooked on a long skewer over a charcoal barbecue.
Keftedakia (κεφτεδάκια)		Meatballs, either fried or oven-baked, seasoned with salt and spices, typically oregano and mint. Some people add grated carrots or capsicum along with onions to the mixture.
Moussaka (μουσακάς)		Casserole made of (typically fried) aubergine, potato, and spiced minced meat. There are other, less common variations besides eggplant, such as zucchini. The modern version of the dish was created by the Greek chef Nikolaos Tselementes in the 1920s
Makálo (μακάλο)		Various dishes (usually meatballs) with garlic sauce from the region of Macedonia.
Mydia (μύδια)		Mussels
Paidakia (παϊδάκια)		Grilled lamb chops with lemon, oregano, salt and pepper.
Pansetta (πανσέτα)		Pork belly meat.
Pastitsio (παστίτσιο)		A baked pasta dish with a filling of ground, spiced minced meat and a Bechamel sauce topping.
Pastitsada (παστιτσάδα)		A casserole dish, traditional pastitsada recipe features spicy veal, beef or poultry.
Pizza (πίτσα)		The Greek version usually contains black olives, feta cheese, tomatoes, peppers and onions.
Soutzoukakia Smyrneika (σουτζουκάκια σμυρνέικα)		Spicy oblong meatballs with cumin and garlic served in tomato sauce.
Snails (σαλιγκάρια)		In Greece and Italy, snails are eaten in a diversity of dishes and sometimes they are even used in sauces and poured over various types of pasta. On Crete, one popular dish is snails in tomato sauce.
Savoro (σαβόρο)		Cooking method for foods marinated and cooked in vinegar. Popular is the savoro fish dish from Corfu.
Sofrito (σοφρίτο)		Veal steak slow-cooked in a white wine, garlic, and herb sauce.
Souvlaki (σουβλάκι)		(Lit: 'little skewer') Anything grilled on a skewer (lamb, chicken, pork, swordfish, shrimp). Most common is pork and chicken, typically marinated in oil, salt, pepper, oregano and lemon. Also known as kalamaki (καλαμάκι)
Spetzofai (σπετζοφάι)		A dish made from country-style sausages, peppers, onions and wine. Originates from Mt. Pelion.
Stifado (στιφάδο)		Cooking method, from the Italian stufato. Game (rabbit, venison), veal or other meat; stew with pearl onions, red wine and cinnamon.
Xiphias (ξιφίας)		Swordfish is generally grilled.
Tonos (τόνος)		Tuna, notable is the "Tonos Alonnisou" (tuna from Alonnisos).
Tiganiá (τηγανιά)		Fried pork. Can be also chicken (Tiganiá Kotopoulo)
Tilichtária (τυλιχτάρια Πατρινά)		Pork meat dish made from minced meat.

== Desserts and sweets ==
Name	Image	Description
Amygdalopita (αμυγδαλόπιτα)		Almond cake made with ground almonds, flour, butter, eggs and pastry cream.
Amygdalota (αμυγδαλωτά)		Rounded cookies with almonds and sugar. Also called Ergolávi.
Baklava (μπακλαβάς)		A rich, sweet dessert pastry made of layers of filo filled with chopped nuts and sweetened and held together with syrup or honey.
Bougatsa (μπουγάτσα)		Pastry consisting of either vanilla custard or (salty) cheese filling between layers of phyllo.
Copenhagi (κοπεγχάγη)		Sweet pastry made of layers of filo filled with almonds, cream and syrup or honey. Named in honour of George I of Greece.
Diples (δίπλες)		A Christmas and wedding delicacy made of thin, sheet-like dough which is cut in large squares and dipped in a swirling fashion in a pot of hot olive oil for a few seconds. As the dough fries, it stiffens into a helical tube; it is then removed immediately and sprinkled with a great amount of honey and crushed walnuts.
Fanouropita (φανουρόπιτα)		A kind of spicebread with ground cloves and cinnamon, resembling a sweet bread rather than a cake. Baked typically on the feast day of Saint Fanourios (August 27), after who it is named.
Finikia (φοινίκια)		The basic ingredients for finikia involve varieties of flour and butter, as well as sugar. Many varieties of this dish exist, including citrus flavourings.
Galaktoboureko (γαλακτομπούρεκο)		Custard between layers of filo.
Karydopita (καρυδόπιτα)		A soft walnut cake flavoured with various spices.
Kourkoubinia (κουρκουμπίνια)		Small rounded sweets with syrup from Thessaloniki.
Kormós (κορμός)		Chocolate salami
Koulourakia (κουλουράκια)		Butter cookies, typically baked for Easter.
Kourabiedes (κουραμπιέδες)		Christmas cookies made by kneading flour, butter and crushed roasted almonds, then generously dusted with powdered sugar. Can also be baked for Easter.
Lazarakia (λαζαράκια)		Lazarákia are small, sweet spice breads made on Lazarus Saturday, the Saturday that begins Holy Week.
Loukoumades (λουκουμάδες)		Fried balls of dough that are often spiced with cinnamon and drizzled with honey. Regionally called also Tsirichtá or Zvigoi.
Mandolato (μαντολάτο)		Greek version of nougat; found everywhere in Greece, but specially made on the Heptanese.
Melomakarona (μελομακάρονα)		"Honey macaroons" which are cookies soaked in a syrup of diluted honey (μέλι or meli in Greek, thus melo-makarona), then sprinkled with crushed walnuts. Typically baked for Easter and Christmas.
Milopita (μηλόπιτα)		Apple pie with cinnamon and powdered sugar.
Moustalevria (μουσταλευριά)		A flour and grape must pudding. Typically found in Cyprus.
Moustokouloura (μουστοκούλουρα)		Cookies of flour kneaded with fresh grape must instead of water.
Melitinia (πασχαλινά μελιτίνια)		These sweet cheese pastries originated in the Cyclades. Soft myzithra goat's milk cheese is typically used as a filling, but ricotta can also be used as a substitute.
Melekouni (μελεκούνι)		Traditional sweet from Rhodes with honey, almonds and sesame (PDO status).
Pastafrola (πασταφλώρα)		Covered jam-filled shortcrust pastry dish principally made from flour, sugar and egg.
Portokalopita (πορτοκαλόπιτα)		Orange pie
Pasteli (παστέλι)		Pasteli are sesame seed candy made from sesame seeds, sugar or honey pressed into a bar.
Platseda (πλατσέδα)		Traditional sweet pie (twisted-pie with nuts & honey) of Lesbos.
Rizogalo (ρυζόγαλο)		Literally meaning 'rice-milk', this is the Greek version of rice pudding. Commonly sprinkled with cinnamon.
Roxakia (ροξάκια)		Small rounded syrup sweets from the region of Macedonia
Spoon sweets (γλυκά του κουταλιού)		Made of various fruits, ripe or unripe, or green unripe nuts. Spoon sweets are essentially made the same way as marmalade, except that the fruit are boiled whole or in large chunks. One particular type of spoon sweet, called υποβρύχιο (literally meaning submarine), is made from mastic, which is found on the island of Chios.
Tiganites/Laggites (τηγανίτες/λαγγίτες/λαλαγγίτες)		Old traditional dessert; type of fried pancakes.
Tsoureki (τσουρέκι)		An Easter sweet bread also known as Lambropsomo (λαμπρόψωμο or Easter bread), flavoured with "mahlepi", the intensely aromatic extract of the stone of the St. Lucie Cherry. It is commonly adorned with almond flakes and red-dyed eggs, according to Easter tradition.
Vasilopita (βασιλόπιτα)		Saint Basil's cake or King's cake, traditionally prepared for New Year's Day. Vasilopites are often baked with a coin inside, and whoever comes across the coin in their slice is considered to have God's blessing for the new year.
Strained yogurt with honey (γιαούρτι με μέλι)		Walnuts, or fruits are often added.

== Cheeses ==
There is a wide variety of cheeses made in various regions across Greece. The vast majority of them are unknown outside Greece. Many artisanal hand made cheeses, both common varieties and local specialties, are produced by small family farms throughout Greece and offer distinct flavors. A good list of some of the varieties of cheese produced and consumed in Greece can be found in the List of Greek Protected Designations of Origin cheeses article. Here are some of the more popular throughout Greece:

Name	Image	Description
Anevato (ανεβατό)		Creamy cheese from the region of Macedonia.
Anthotyros (ανθότυρος)		A traditional fresh and flowery cheese. There are dry Anthotyros and fresh Anthotyros.
Formaela (φορμαέλλα)		A hard cheese produced exclusively in Arachova, Greece and it is famous and registered in the European Union as a protected designation of origin since 1996.
Feta (φέτα)		Feta is a white salty Greek cheese slice made from the milk of sheep or goats.
Graviera (γραβιέρα)		Graviera is one of the most popular cheeses in Crete. It is a hard cheese with a light yellow color, and has a slightly sweet and nutty taste. The Cretan version (there are also gravieras made elsewhere: Naxos, Agrafa etc.) is made from sheep's milk, or sheep's milk with a small amount of goat's milk.
Kasseri (κασέρι)		Kasseri is a medium-hard pale yellow cheese made from unpasteurized sheep's milk with very little, if any, goat's milk mixed in.
Kefalotyri (κεφαλοτύρι)		Kefalotyri or kefalotiri is a hard, salty yellow cheese made from sheep milk or goat's milk in Greece and Cyprus.
Kefalograviera (κεφαλογραβιέρα)		Kefalograviera is a hard table cheese usually produced from sheep's milk or mixture of sheep's and goat's milk.
Kopanisti (κοπανιστή)		Salty spicy cheese produced in the Cyclades.
Ladotyri Mytilinis (λαδοτύρι Μυτιλήνης)		Cheese made with ovine milk or with a mixture of ovine and caprine milk, the latter of which should not exceed 30%.
Melichloro (Μελίχλωρο)		Local cheese from Lemnos island.
Myzithra (μυζήθρα)		Mizithra or Myzithra is a fresh cheese made with milk and whey from sheep or goats. The ratio of milk to whey usually is 7 to 3.
Manouri (μανούρι)		Manouri is a Greek semi-soft, fresh white whey cheese made from goat or sheep milk as a by-product following the production of feta. It is produced primarily in Thessalia and Macedonia in central and northern Greece.
Mastelo (μαστέλο)		Cow's milk cheese from Chios.
Metsovone (μετσοβόνε)		Metsovone is a semi-hard smoked pasta filata cheese produced in the region of Metsovo. Metsovone has been a European protected designation of origin since 1996. Metsovone is manufactured from cow's milk or a mixture of cow and sheep or goat milk. It is produced by the Aromanians of Metsovo.
San Michali (σαν μιχάλη)		Cow's milk cheese from Syros.

== Drinks ==
Name	Image	Description
Commandaria (κουμανδαρία)		A fortified wine described by Hesiod in ancient times produced in Cyprus and used during Holy Communion.
Beer (μπύρα)		Widely drunk; common brands include Vergina, Heineken, Amstel, Zeos, Mythos, Alfa Hellenic Lager, Fix, Henninger, and Kaiser, all of which are produced by local companies or under license.
Greek coffee (ελληνικός/τούρκικος καφές)		Turkish coffee, brewed in a small long-handled pot (briki, μπρίκι) using very finely ground coffee beans. It is served unfiltered, often with a glass of water.
Greek frappé coffee (καφέ φραπέ)		A foam-covered drink derived from spray-dried instant coffee that is consumed cold.
Kitron (κίτρον/κίτρο)		Citron liqueur produced on the island of Naxos.
Kumquat (κουμκάτ)		Liqueur, popular in Corfu.
Mastichato (μαστιχάτο)		Mastika is a liquor seasoned with mastic, a resin gathered from the mastic tree, a small evergreen tree native to the island of Chios.
Mavrodafni (μαυροδάφνη Πατρών)		Sweet, liquor-style, red wine with higher alcohol percentage than normal. This dessert wine originated in the city of Patras.
Metaxa (μεταξά)		A brand of sweet brandy, 40% alcohol content.
Ouzo (ούζο)		An 80-proof clear alcoholic beverage that is flavored with anise; it turns milky white with water or ice.
Retsina (ρετσίνα)		A white wine with pine resin added; a specialty popular in northern Greece and Thessaloniki. It is invariably drunk young.
Tentura (τεντούρα)		A cinnamon flavored liquor from Patras.
Tsikoudia (τσικουδιά)		An alcoholic beverage, a fragrant, grape-based pomace brandy of Cretan origin that contains 25% to 32% alcohol by volume. Tsikoudia is sometimes called rakı, (ρακή), from the Arabic word arak, meaning distilled.
Tsipouro (τσίπουρο)		Often home-brewed, a clear drink produced from grape pomace, often with higher alcohol content, and usually not flavored with herbs. The city of Volos at the centre of Greece is well known for its Tsipouradika (literally: tsipouro places). In Thessaly tsipouro is always flavored with anise. Tsipouro is often called raki (ρακί).
Zivania (ζιβανία)		Cypriot pomace brandy produced from the distillation of a mixture of grape pomace and local dry wines made from Xynisteri and Mavro grapes.
Greek wine (ελληνικό κρασί)		The most common drink in Greece. Legend claims that wine was invented on the island of Icaria.
