= Cuisine of the Ionian Islands =

Culinary tradition

The Cuisine of the Ionian islands or Heptanesean cuisine (Greek: Επτανησιακή κουζίνα Venetian: Cusina de le Isole Ionie) is a type of Greek cuisine associated with the Ionian Islands region. It has more influences from Italian cuisine than can be found in any other part of Greece due to the long period of Venetian rule in the Ionian Islands.

== Cephalonia ==
Notable dishes include:

- Andrakla (salad)
- Pissara (salad)
- Bourbourelia, mix of cereals and legumes
- Kreatopita (meat pie)
- Prentza, creamy cheese
- Omeletta
- Riganada
- Sofigado, meat (lamb or veal) with vegetables
- Tsigaridia, greens
- Tsouknidopita

== Corfu ==
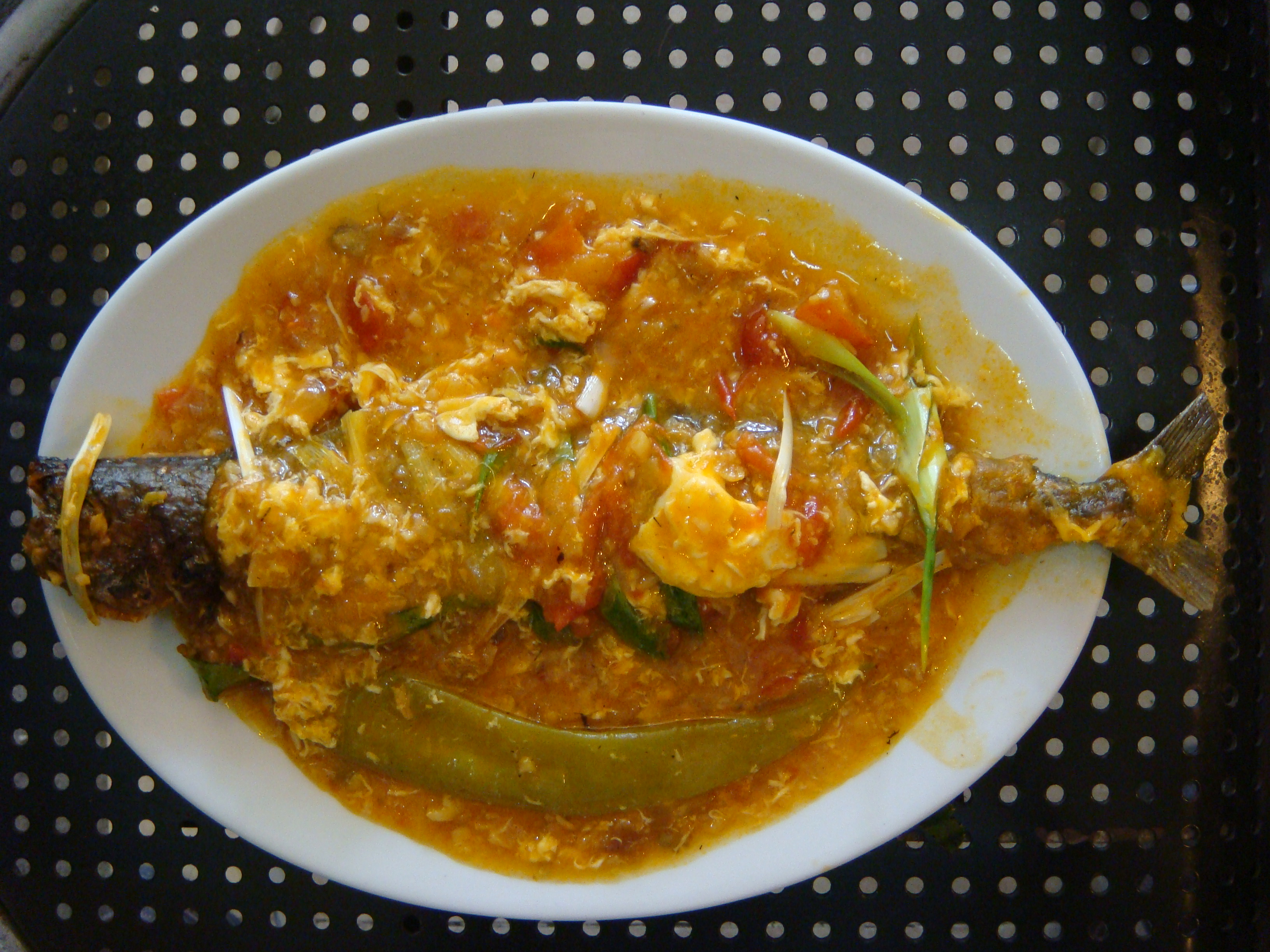
Savoro

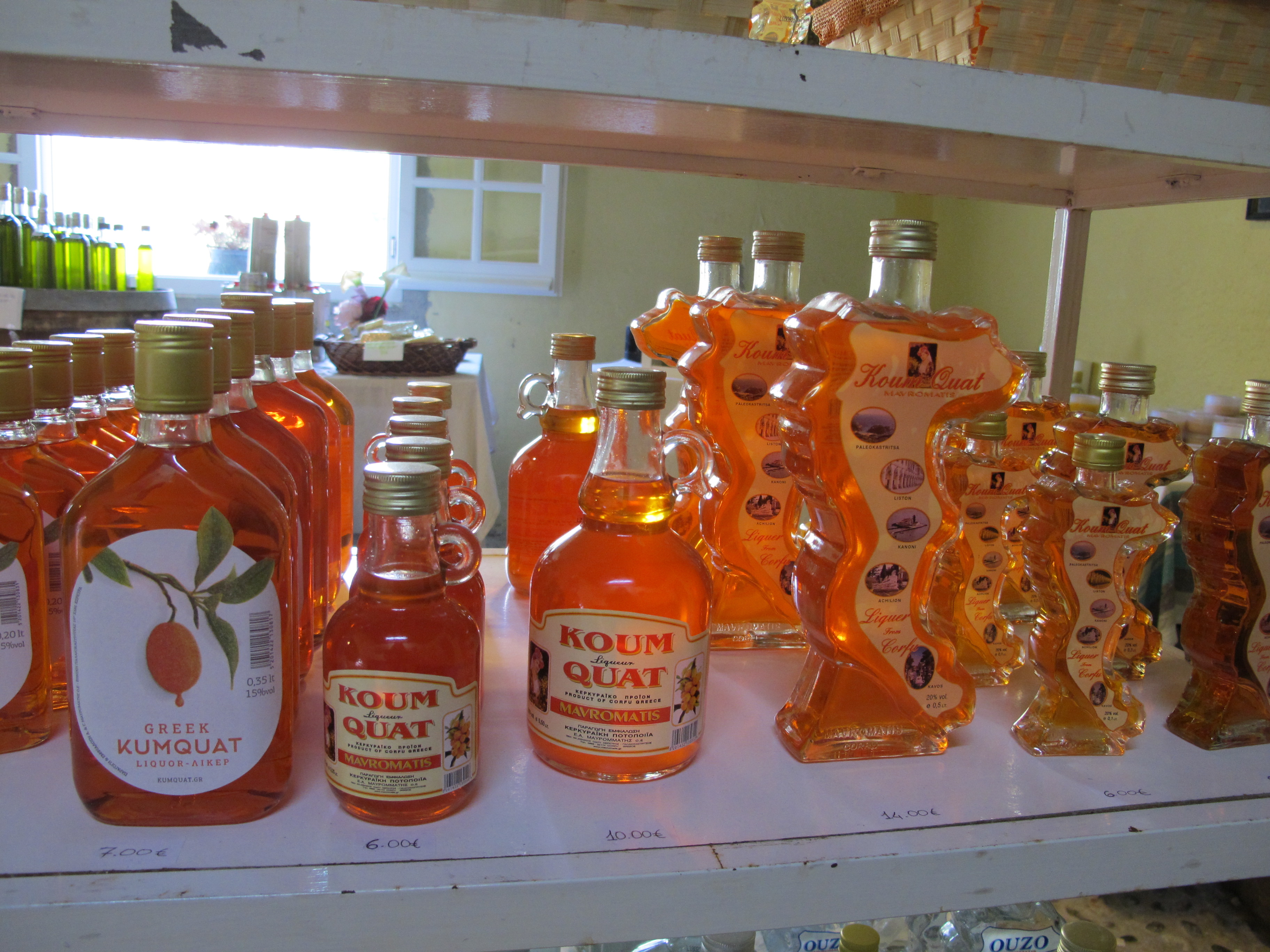
Bottles with Kumquat

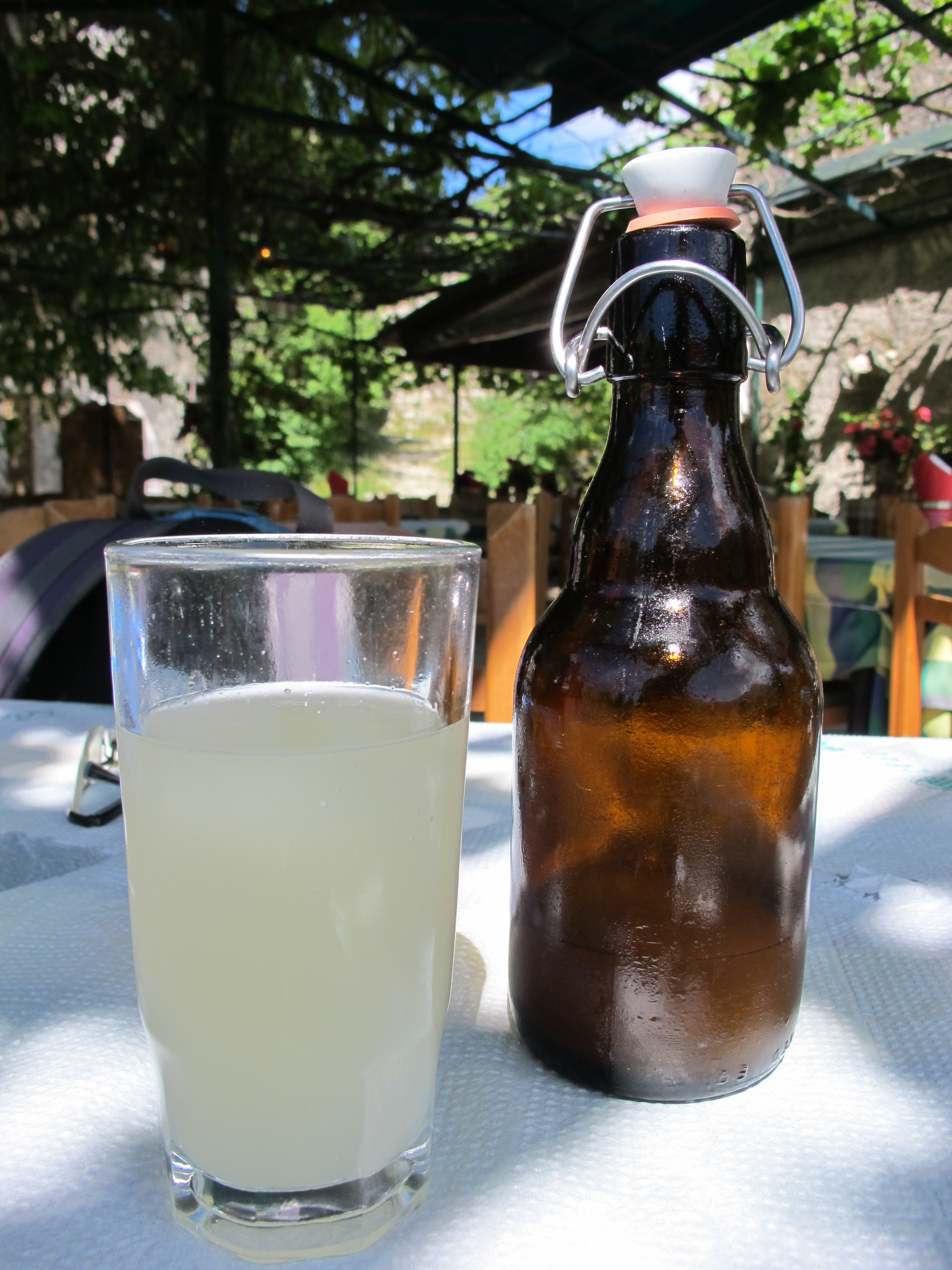
Tzitzibira

- Bianco, fish dish
- Bourdeto, fish dish
- Bourou-bourou, pasta soup
- Corfú, yellow cheese
- Niokos, type of orzo (pasta)
- Pastitsio, baked pasta
- Pastitsada
- Poulenta (Polenta)
- Savoro
- Sofrito
- Salado, local salami
- Tsigareli
- Noumboulo, pork tenderloin
- Polpettes, meatballs
- Fogatsa, type of bread (similar to Tsoureki)
- Colombina (type of tsoureki)
- Bianceta (dessert)
- Bolsevikos, dessert
- Mandola (dessert)
- Ginger beer (Tzitzibira)
- Kumquat drink

== Othonoi ==
- Bianco
- Bourdeto
- Patatopita ( Potato Pie )
- Pastitsada
- Poulenta

== Lefkada ==
- Frygadeli, lamb meat
- Riganada
- Sofigado, meat (lamb or veal) with vegetables
- Salami Lefkadas
- Tsigaridia, greens
- Galatopita (dessert)
- Soumada, drink

== Zakynthos ==
- Boutridia, vegetables
- Bourdeto (with meat instead of fish)
- Sofigadoura, vegetables (optionally with meat)
- Polpettes, meatballs
- Sgatzeto, goat meat
- Zante currant
- Frigania (dessert)
- Fritoura (dessert)
- Rafiolia (dessert)

Common sweets, often found in the Ionian islands, are pasteli and mandolato.

== Gallery ==
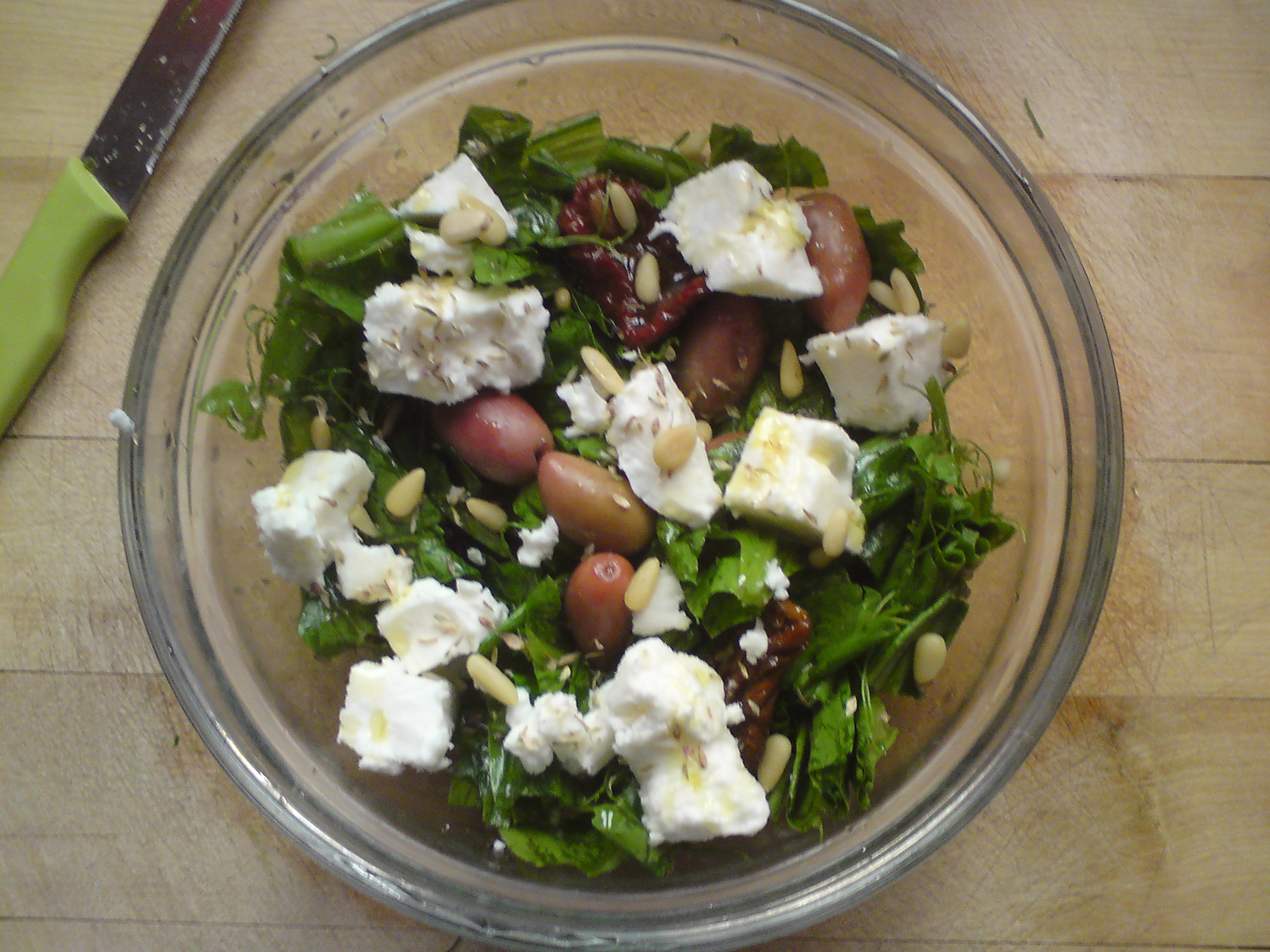
Pissara salad (Kephalonia)

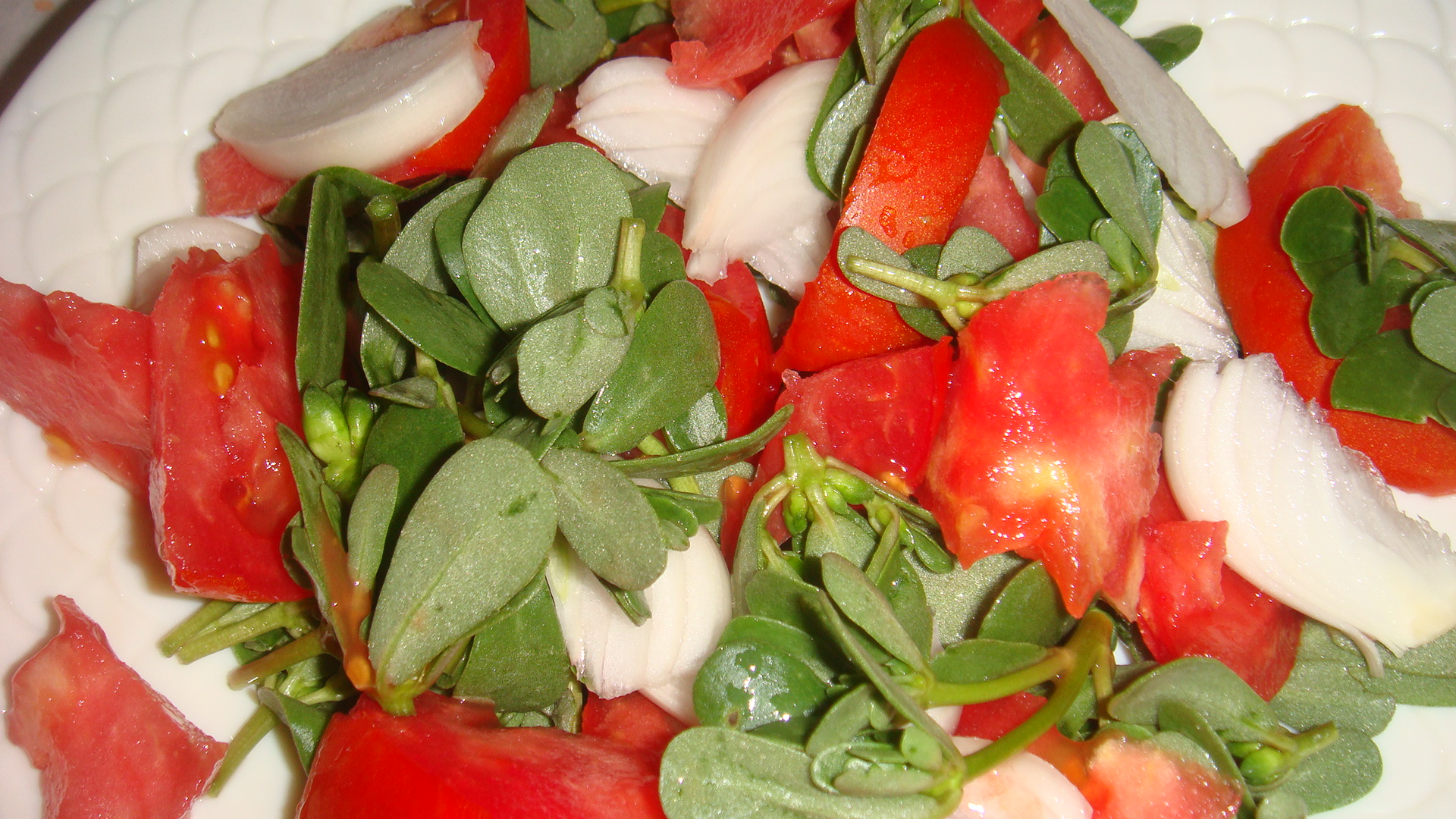
Andrakla salad (Kephalonia)

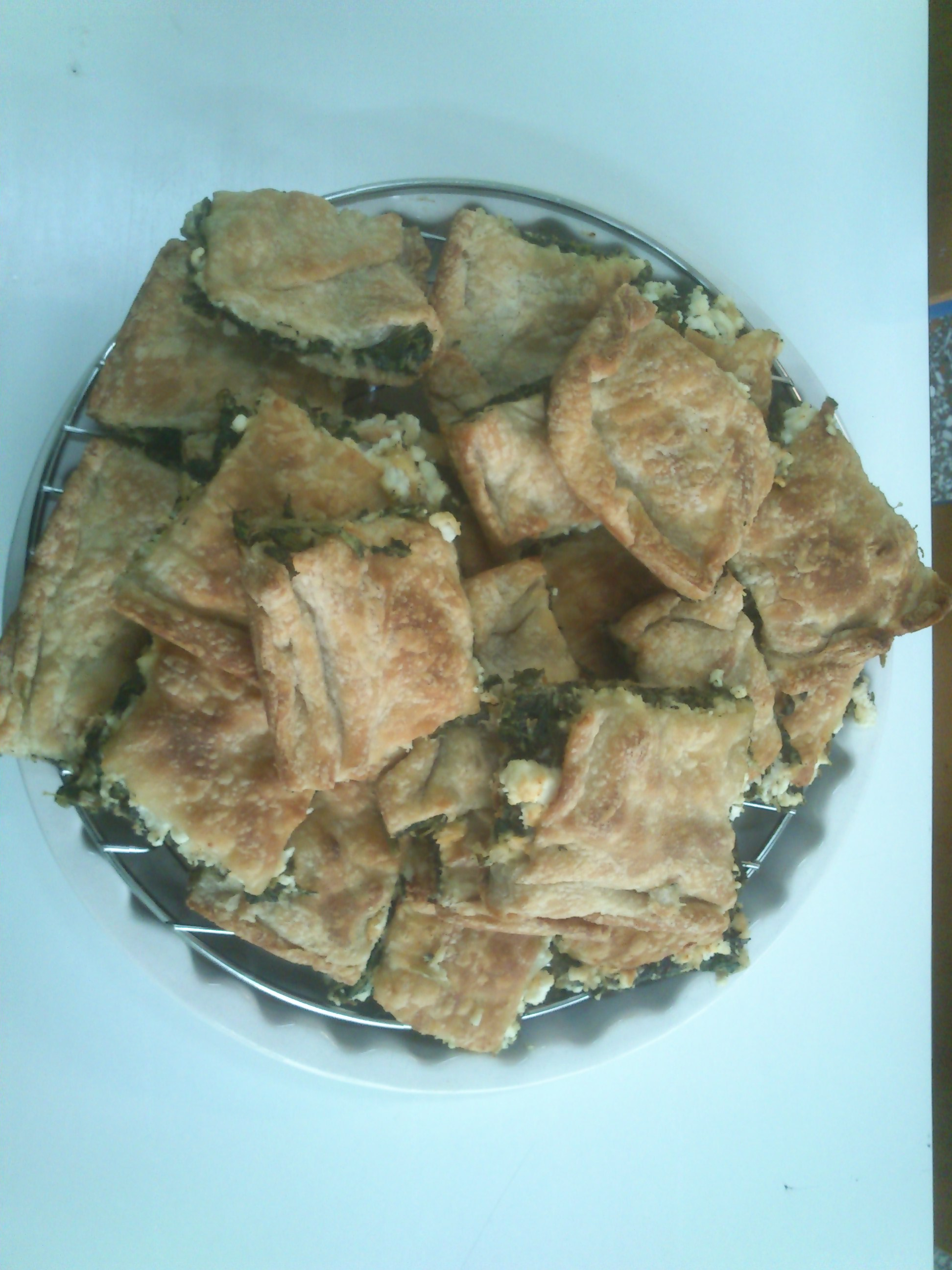
Tsouknidopita

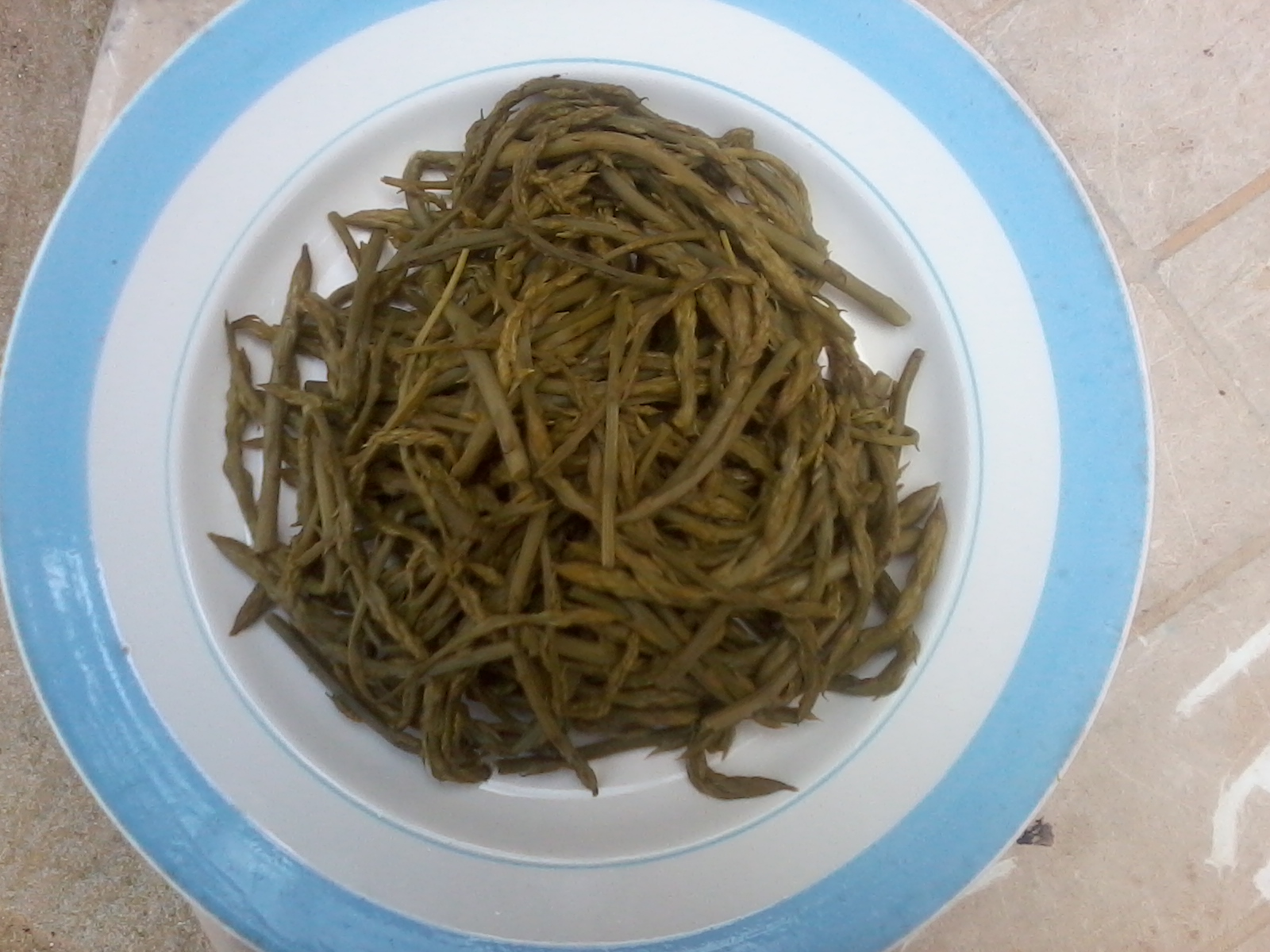
Boiled asparagus (Sparagia)

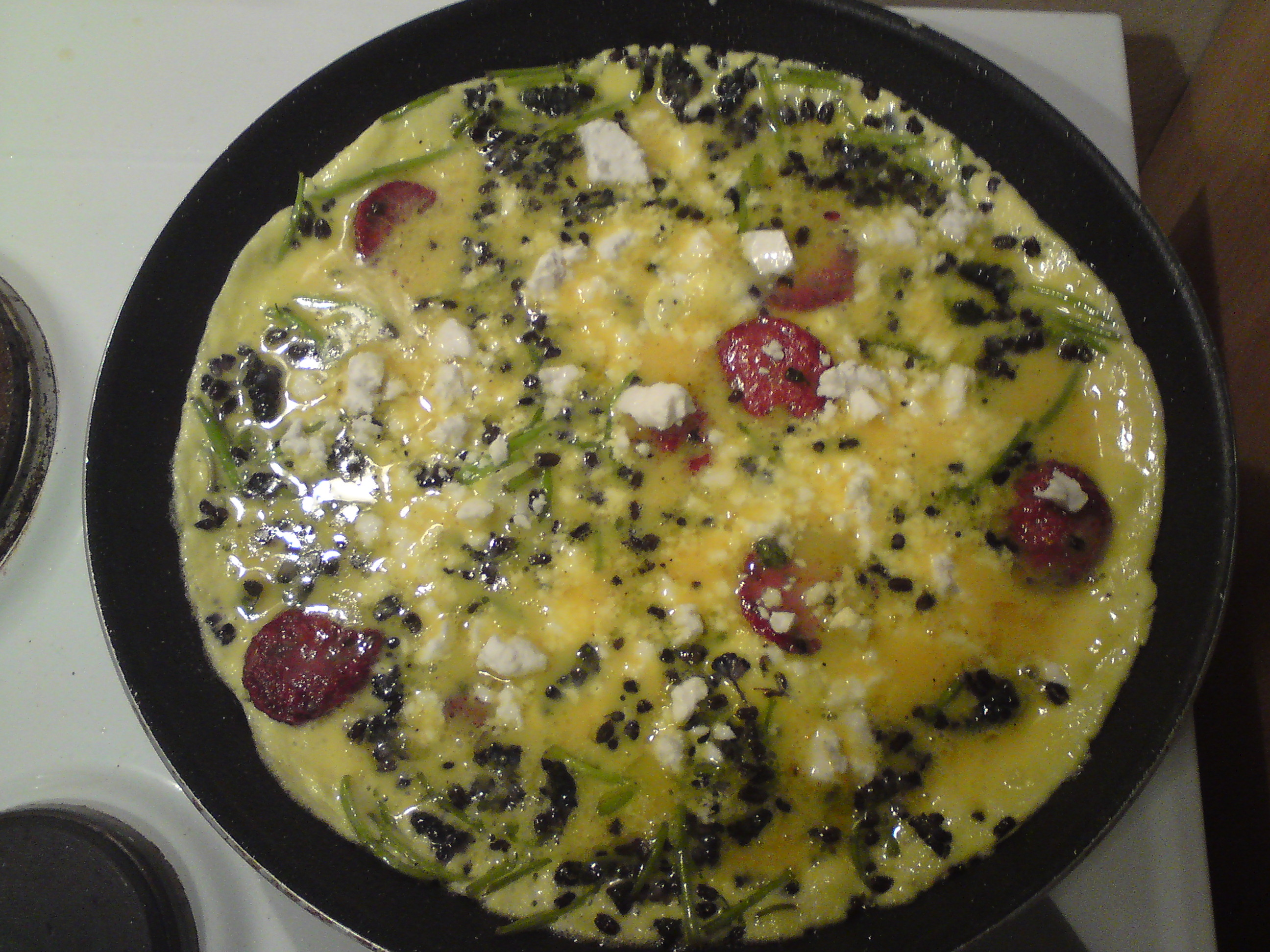
Omeletta

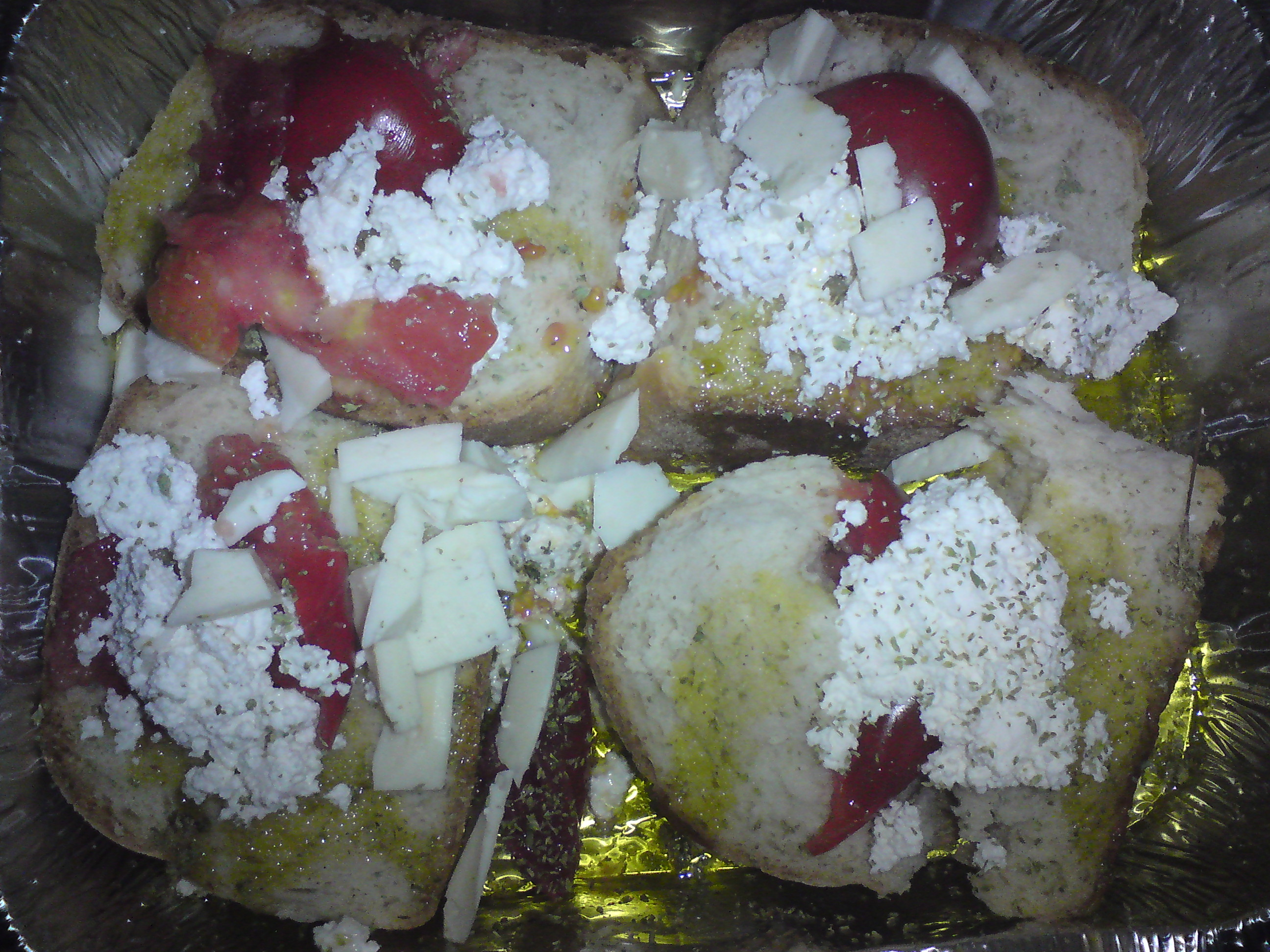
Riganada

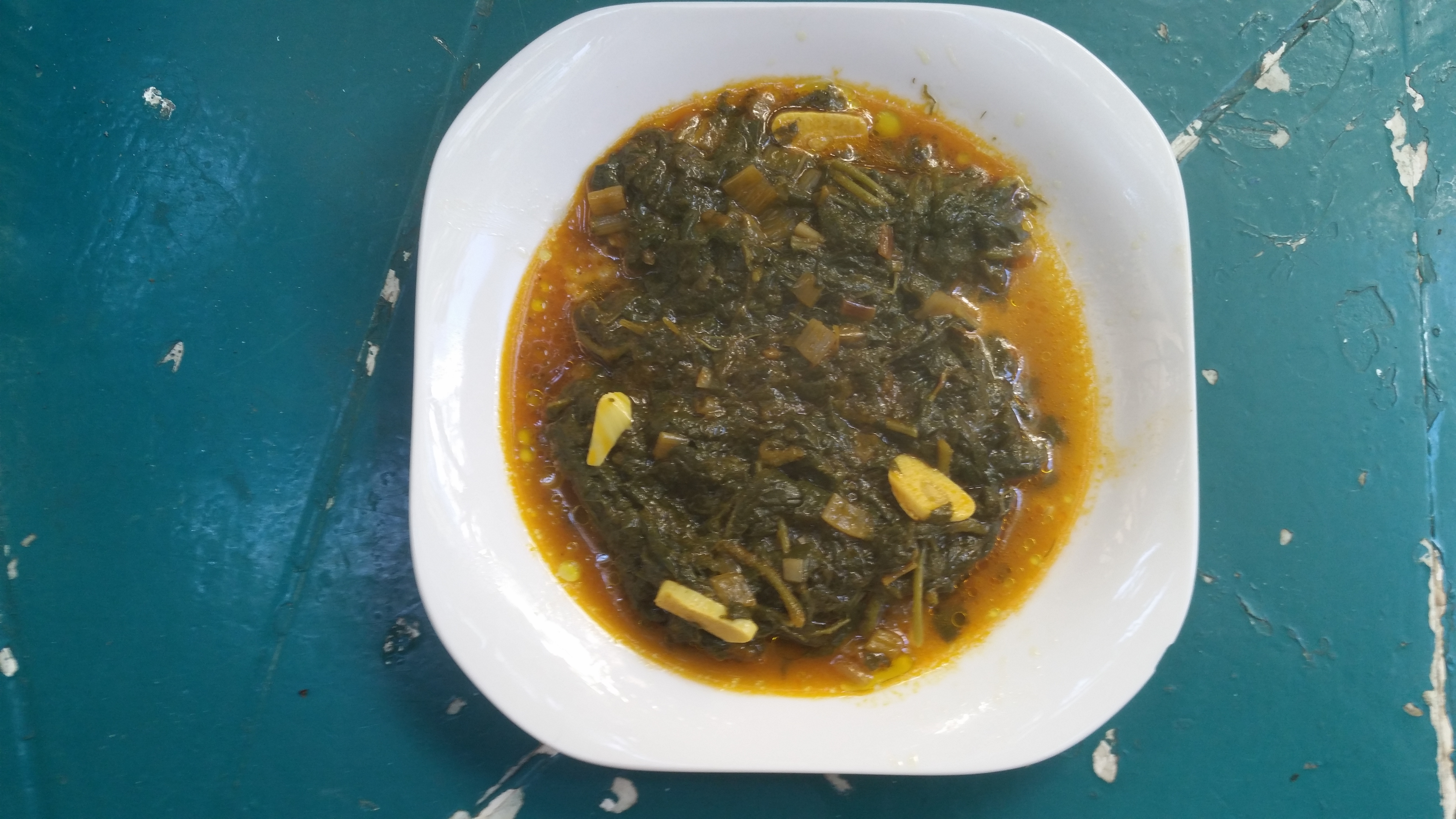
Tsigaridia

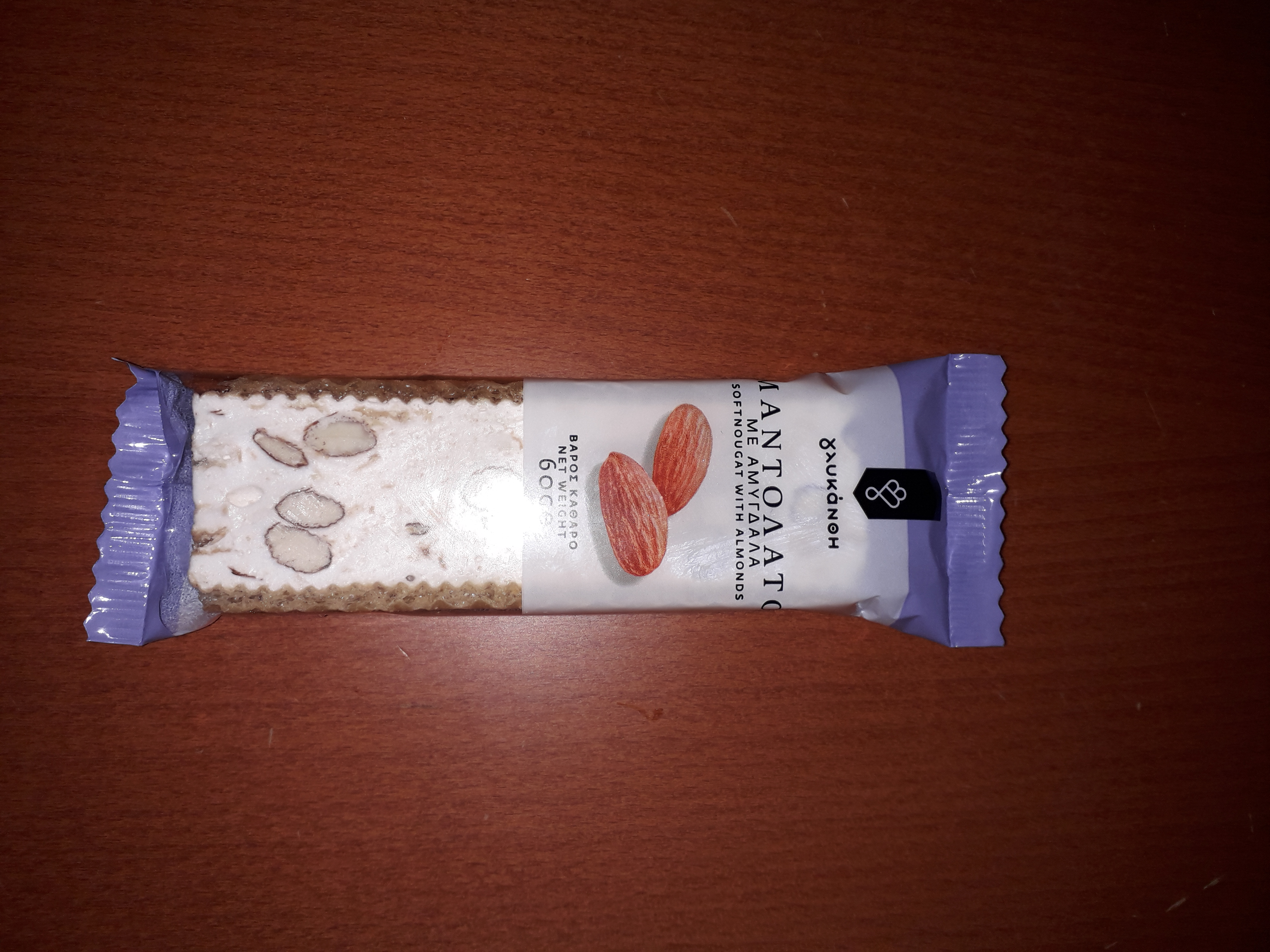
A mandolato

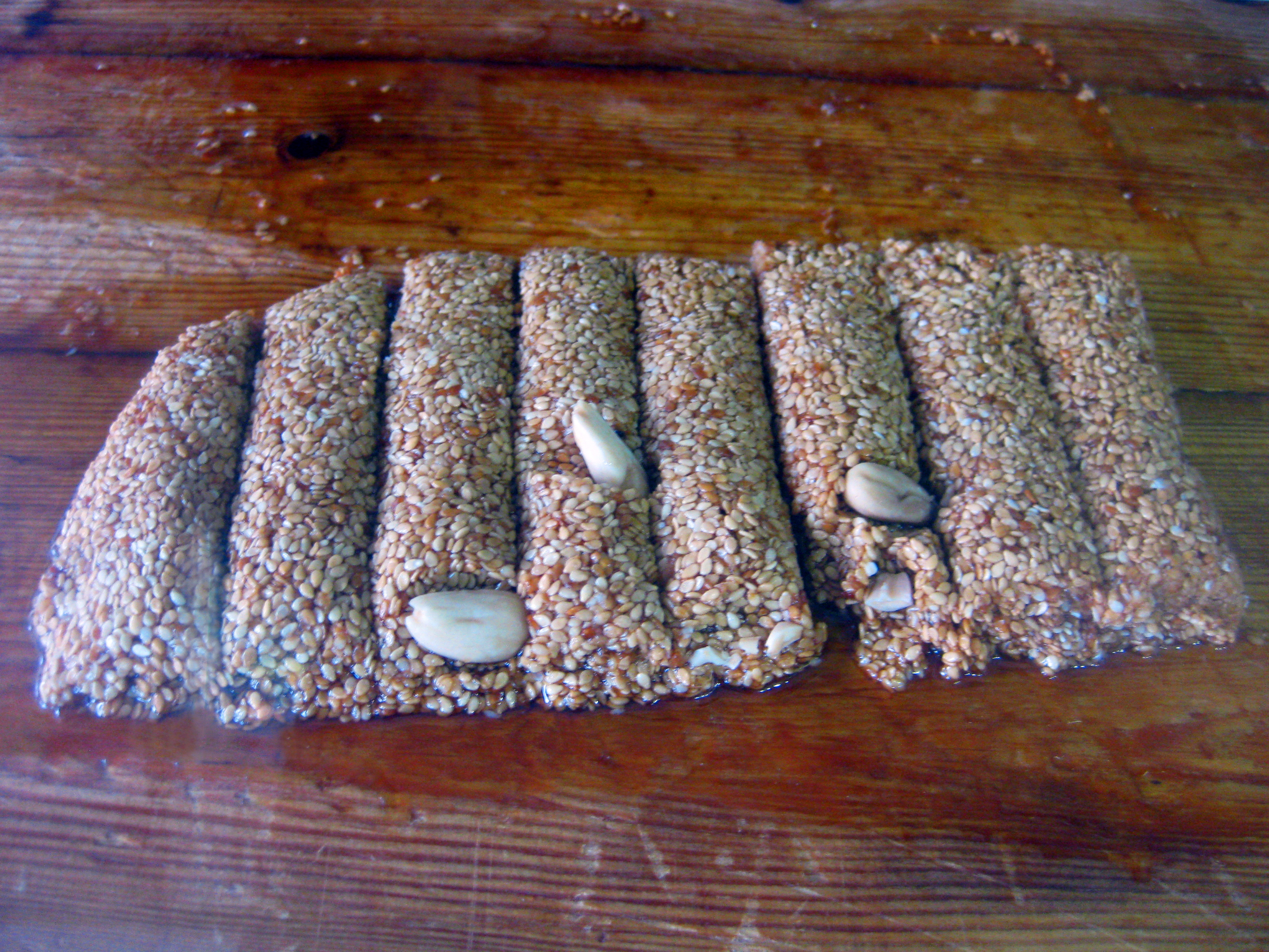
A type of pasteli

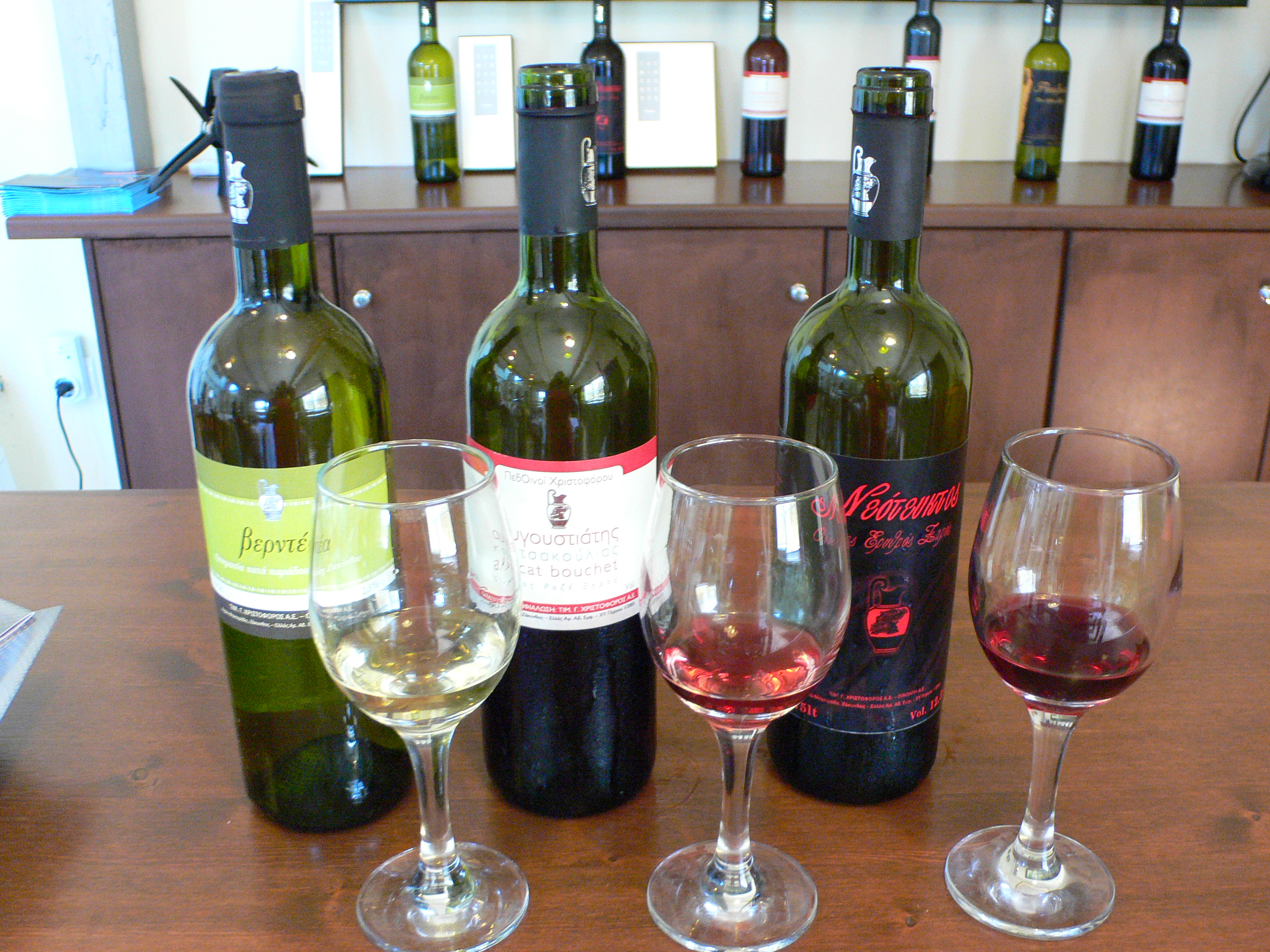
Different wines in Zakynthos

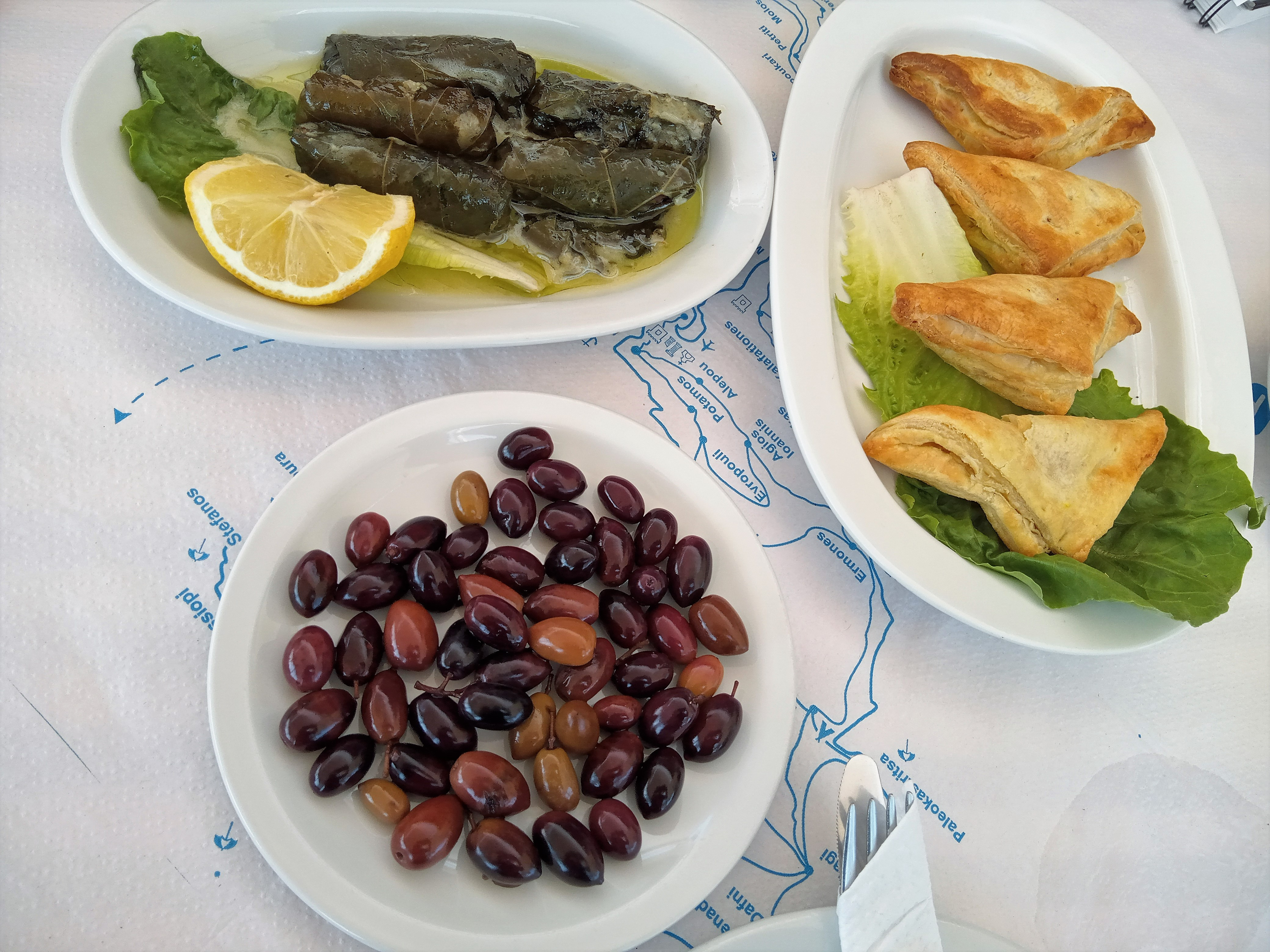
Starters on Corfu island, Messonghi village

== See also ==
- Cephalonia
- Corfu
- Cuisine of the Mediterranean
- Diapontian Islands
- Greek cuisine
- Greek restaurant
- Lefkada
- Zakynthos

== Sources ==
- Γεύσεις Ιονίων νήσων
