= My Kitchen Rules series 13 =

Series of television show

My Kitchen Rules
- Series 13
- Starring: Manu Feildel; Colin Fassnidge; Nigella Lawson
- No. of episodes: 15

Release
- Original network: Seven Network
- Original release: 4 September – 3 October 2023

Season chronology
- ← Previous; Series 12 (2022) Next → Series 14 (2024)

The thirteenth season of the Australian competitive cooking competition show My Kitchen Rules premiered on the Seven Network on 4 September 2023.

In October 2022, the series was renewed for a 13th season. In April 2023, it was announced Colin Fassnidge will become a main judge and co-host alongside Manu Feildel, with Nigella Lawson returning as a judge after the instant restaurants.

The start date for the season was confirmed as 4 September 2023.

== Teams ==
State		Group	Members	Relationship	Status
NSW		1	Radha & Prabha	Identical twins	Winners 3 October (Grand Finale)
VIC		1/2	Nick & Christian	Food maestros	Runners-Up 3 October (Grand Finale)
SA		1/2	Sonia & Marcus	Mother and son	Eliminated 2 October (Semi-final Round 2)
VIC	WA	1	Tommy & Rach	Just friends	Eliminated 2 October (Semi-final Round 1)
SA	NSW	2	Aaron & Chris	BBQ champions	Eliminated 1 October (Quarter-final Round 2)
QLD		1/2	Claudean & Anthony	Married battlers	Eliminated 1 October (Quarter-final Round 2)
NSW		2	Amber & Mel	Childhood friends	Eliminated 1 October (Quarter-final Round 1)
QLD		2	Patricija and Brigita	Sisters	Eliminated 27 September (Instant Restaurant: Round 2)
NSW		1	Coco & Pearls	Feisty friends	Eliminated 13 September (Instant Restaurant: Round 1)

== Controversy ==
At the time of broadcast, it was announced that a couple appearing on the program was accused of a combined total of 37 charges for offences against children. The names of the couple were suppressed at that time. In April 2025, it was revealed that the couple was Claudean and Anthony Mu. Anthony is facing several charges including assault occasioning bodily harm and common assault. His case is adjourned until January 2026. Claudean pleaded guilty in April 2025 to six historical common assault offences. She was sentenced to a $1000 fine and a 12-month good behaviour bond. She is facing 12 other charges, including rape, for which she has been committed to stand trial in the District Court at a later date.

== Elimination history ==
Teams' Competition Progress
Round:	Instant Restaurants		Quarter-final		Semi-final		Grand Finale
Round:	1	2	1	2	1	2	Grand Finale
Teams:	Progress						
Radha & Prabha	1st (87)	→			Safe	Safe	Winners (27)
Nick & Christian	4th (66)	2nd (75)	Safe (2nd)	Safe (1st)	Safe	Safe	Runners-up (25)
Sonia & Marcus	3rd (71)	1st (85)	→		Safe	Lose	Eliminated (Episode 14)
Tommy & Rach	2nd (78)	→	—N/a	Safe (2nd)	Lose	Eliminated (Episode 14)	
Aaron & Chris	—N/a	3rd (72)	Safe (1st)	Lose (3rd)	Eliminated (Episode 13)		
Claudean & Anthony	5th (53)	4th (68)	Safe (3rd)	Lose (4th)	Eliminated (Episode 13)		
Amber & Mel	—N/a	5th (61)	Lose (4th)	Eliminated (Episode 13)			
Patricija & Brigita	—N/a	6th (60)	Eliminated (Episode 12)				
Coco & Pearls	6th (50)	Eliminated (Episode 6)					

Cell Descriptions
	Team won a challenge, cooked the best dish or received the highest score for the round.
Safe	Team was safe from elimination after passing a challenge/round.
→	Team continued to next the challenge/round.
	Team was eliminated after losing in a Cook-Off or round.

== Competition details ==
=== Instant Restaurants ===
During the Instant Restaurant rounds, each team hosts a three-course dinner for judges and fellow teams in their allocated group. They are scored and ranked among their group. The highest scoring team at the end of the round will advance directly to the Semi Final, while the lowest scoring team will be eliminated.

==== Round 1 ====
- Episodes 1 to 6
- Airdate — 4 to 13 September
- Description — The first of the two instant restaurant groups are introduced into the competition in Round 1. The highest scoring team at the end of the round will advance directly to the Semi Final, while the second highest advances to the Quarter Final. The lowest scoring team will be eliminated whilst the remaining teams head into the second instant restaurant.

Instant Restaurant Summary
Group 1
Team and Episode Details			Guest Scores						Manu's Scores			Colin's Scores			Total (out of 110)	Rank	Result
Team and Episode Details			T&R	S&M	R&P	C&P	N&C	C&A	Entrée	Main	Dessert	Entrée	Main	Dessert	Total (out of 110)	Rank	Result
VIC	WA	Tommy & Rach	—	7	7	7	7	6	8	10	4	7	9	6	78	2nd	Through to Quarter Final
Ep 1		4 September	The Saucy Spoon														Through to Quarter Final
Dishes		Entrée	Rottnest Scallops with White Puree and Tarragon and Miso Butter														Through to Quarter Final
Dishes		Main	Crispy Duck Leg with Blackberry and Port Jus and Potato Gratin														Through to Quarter Final
Dishes		Dessert	Chocolate Coated Pear Ice Cream with Cookie Crumb														Through to Quarter Final
SA		Sonia & Marcus	5	—	6	7	5	5	7	6	10	5	5	10	71	3rd	Through to Second Instant Restaurant
Ep 2		5 September	Nothing's Off The Table														Through to Second Instant Restaurant
Dishes		Entrée	Crumpets with Buttered Lobster														Through to Second Instant Restaurant
Dishes		Main	Squid Ink Linguine														Through to Second Instant Restaurant
Dishes		Dessert	Margarita Bombe Alaska														Through to Second Instant Restaurant
NSW		Radha & Prabha	8	7	—	8	8	8	9	10	5	10	10	4	87	1st	Through to Semi Final
Ep 3		6 September	Royal Dhaba														Through to Semi Final
Dishes		Entrée	Chicken 65 with Mint Yogurt														Through to Semi Final
Dishes		Main	Lamb Rogan Josh														Through to Semi Final
Dishes		Dessert	Jalebi with Rabri														Through to Semi Final
NSW		Coco & Pearls	4	4	5	—	4	4	5	7	3	4	7	3	50	6th	Eliminated
Ep 4		11 September	The Boujee Foodies														Eliminated
Dishes		Entrée	Champagne Pasta Roses														Eliminated
Dishes		Main	Crispy Pork Belly with Braised Red Cabbage and Mash														Eliminated
Dishes		Dessert	Coco Pearls														Eliminated
VIC		Nick & Christian	7	6	4	6	—	5	10	7	2	9	7	3	66	4th	Through to Second Instant Restaurant
Ep 5		12 September	3181														Through to Second Instant Restaurant
Dishes		Entrée	Kangaroo Tartare with Saltbush and Potato Crisps														Through to Second Instant Restaurant
Dishes		Main	Chargrilled Swordfish with Jalapeño & Corn Salsa and Nduja Butter														Through to Second Instant Restaurant
Dishes		Dessert	Sokolatopita with Orange Crème Fraîche														Through to Second Instant Restaurant
QLD		Claudean & Anthony	4	5	4	4	4	—	7	6	4	7	5	3	53	5th	Through to Second Instant Restaurant
Ep 6		13 September	Papa & Mama Mu's														Through to Second Instant Restaurant
Dishes		Entrée	Ricotta, Spinach & Mushroom Ravioli with White Wine Sauce														Through to Second Instant Restaurant
Dishes		Main	Osso Buco with Anchovy Gremolata and Polenta														Through to Second Instant Restaurant
Dishes		Dessert	Ant's Choc Hazelnut Fior Di Latte Gelato with Crostoli														Through to Second Instant Restaurant

==== Round 2 ====
- Episodes 7 to 12
- Airdate — 18 to 27 September
- Description — The remaining three teams from the first instant restaurant return along with three new “gatecrashers” for the second instant restaurant. The highest scoring team at the end of the round will advance directly to the Semi Final. The lowest scoring team will be eliminated.

Instant Restaurant Summary
Group 2
Team and Episode Details			Guest Scores						Manu's Scores			Colin's Scores			Total (out of 110)	Rank	Result
Team and Episode Details			A&C	C&A	A&M	N&C	S&M	P&B	Entrée	Main	Dessert	Entrée	Main	Dessert	Total (out of 110)	Rank	Result
SA	NSW	Aaron & Chris	—	4	7	6	6	7	7	7	7	7	7	7	72	3rd	Safe
Ep 7		18 September	Meat Dreams														Safe
Dishes		Entrée	Crispy Pork Belly Tacos														Safe
Dishes		Main	BBQ Plate														Safe
Dishes		Dessert	Lemon Lime Pie														Safe
QLD		Claudean & Anthony	4	—	6	6	6	7	9	9	2	9	8	2	68	4th	Safe
Ep 8		19 September	Papa & Mama Mu's														Safe
Dishes		Entrée	Stuffed Zucchini Flowers Basil Pesto														Safe
Dishes		Main	Rabbit Stew with Thyme, Black Olives and Citrus														Safe
Dishes		Dessert	Tiramisu														Safe
NSW		Amber & Mel	5	4	—	5	4	5	5	5	9	6	5	8	61	5th	Safe
Ep 9		20 September	Salty Secrets														Safe
Dishes		Entrée	Spiced Lamb with Hummus, Pomegranate and Pita Bread														Safe
Dishes		Main	Baked Fish with Tahini Sauce, Roasted Almonds and Caramelised Onion														Safe
Dishes		Dessert	Upside-down Orange Cake with Orange Ginger Ice Cream														Safe
VIC		Nick & Christian	5	5	6	—	6	5	9	8	7	9	8	7	75	2nd	Safe
Ep 10		21/25 September	3181														Safe
Dishes		Entrée	Charred Octopus with Eggplant Puree and Pickled Cucumber														Safe
Dishes		Main	Short Rib Souvlaki														Safe
Dishes		Dessert	Choc Malt Semifreddo with Hazelnut Praline														Safe
SA		Sonia & Marcus	8	7	8	8	—	7	9	7	8	9	7	7	85	1st	Through to Semi-Final
Ep 11		26 September	Nothing's Off The Table														Through to Semi-Final
Dishes		Entrée	Ricotta and Spinach Ravioli with Butter & Sage Sauce														Through to Semi-Final
Dishes		Main	Rib Eye with Salsa Verde and Mash														Through to Semi-Final
Dishes		Dessert	Passionfruit Cheesecake with Almond Crust														Through to Semi-Final
QLD		Patricija & Brigita	4	6	3	5	5	—	7	5	7	6	4	8	60	6th	Eliminated
Ep 12		27 September	Šeimininkė														Eliminated
Dishes		Entrée	Šaltibarščiai with Potatoes & Dill														Eliminated
Dishes		Main	Vedarai with Bacon & Sour Cream Sauce														Eliminated
Dishes		Dessert	Medaus Tortas														Eliminated

=== Quarter-final ===
- Episode 13
- Airdate — 1 October
- Description — Five teams competed in the Quarter Final with Nigella Lawson joining Manu Feildel and Colin Fassnidge as judges. The challenge was over two rounds; in round one teams had to create a dish with a key ingredient, and the team with the least liked dish was eliminated. In round 2 each team had to create a dessert within 60 minutes, and the two teams with the least liked dishes were eliminated, whilst the remaining two went to the Semi-final. Nick & Christian got a 15-minute advantage in the first round.

Quarter-final summary
Round 1: Key Ingredient
Team			Main Ingredient	Dish	Result
VIC	WA	Tommy & Rach	—		Fast-tracked to round 2
SA	NSW	Aaron & Chris	Pork	Dong Po Rou with Special Rice and Bok Choy	Through to round 2
VIC		Nick & Christian	Fruit & Veg	Dukkah Roasted Pumpkin with Spanakorizo	Through to round 2
QLD		Claudean & Anthony	Chicken	Carusti Italian Chicken with Roast Vegetable Salad	Through to round 2
NSW		Amber & Mel	Beef	Kibbeh with Yogurt Sauce	Eliminated
Round 2: Dessert
Team			Dish		Result
VIC		Nick & Christian	Blue Cheese Cigars with Red Wine Figs		Through to Semi-final
VIC	WA	Tommy & Rach	Sticky Date Pudding with Butterscotch Sauce		Through to Semi-final
SA	NSW	Aaron & Chris	Chocolate Fondant with Pistachio Crumb		Eliminated
QLD		Claudean & Anthony	Zeppole Two Ways		Eliminated

=== Semi-final ===
- Episodes 14
- Airdate — 2 October
- Description — The four remaining teams enter the semi-final. The challenge is over two rounds; in round one the teams must each create an Amuse-bouche, the team with the least liked dish is eliminated. In round two the teams must prepare a main and a dessert, again the team with the least liked dish is eliminated and the two remaining teams will advance to the Grand Final.

Semi-final Summary
Round 1: Amuse-Bouche
Team			Dish		Result
VIC		Nick & Christian	Amuse-bouche	Salmon Tartare with Tarama	Through to round 2
SA		Sonia & Marcus	Amuse-bouche	Scallop on Potato Crisp with Pea Purée	Through to round 2
NSW		Radha & Prabha	Amuse-bouche	Seekh Kebab with Mint Yoghurt and Roti	Through to round 2
VIC	WA	Tommy & Rach	Amuse-bouche	Stuffed Mushroom	Eliminated
Round 2: Main & Dessert
VIC		Nick & Christian	Main	Pork Ox Tongue with Tuna Gribiche	Through to Grand Finale
VIC		Nick & Christian	Dessert	Poached Apple with Whiskey Caramel	Through to Grand Finale
NSW		Radha & Prabha	Main	Chilli Masala Crab with Rice and Cucumber & Onion Salad	Through to Grand Finale
NSW		Radha & Prabha	Dessert	Rosewater & Cardamom Panna Cotta with Pistachio Crumble	Through to Grand Finale
SA		Sonia & Marcus	Main	Pork Cotoletta Tonnato with Fennel Salad	Eliminated
SA		Sonia & Marcus	Dessert	Hazelnut Chocolate Dacquoise	Eliminated

=== Grand Finale ===
- Episodes 15
- Airdate — 3 October
- Description — Nick & Christian take on Radha & Prabha in this Grand Final. They had to cook a four-course meal for the judges, the eliminated teams and their family and friends, 25 plates per course. The judges including Manu, Colin and Nigella scored each set of 4 meals out of 10 for the final verdict.

Grand Final
Team		Manu's Scores	Colin's Scores	Nigella's Scores	Total (out of 30)	Result
NSW	Radha & Prabha	9	9	9	27	Winners
Dishes		Royal Dhaba				Winners
Entrée		Spicy Fish Fry with Yellow Dhal and Tomato Chutney				Winners
Seafood Course		Kerala Prawn Curry with Roti and Spiced Potato and Eggplant				Winners
Meat Course		Chicken Biryani with Cucumber Raita and Pickled Onion				Winners
Dessert		Pistachio Ice Cream Chocolate Dome with Almond and Orange Zest Crumb				Winners
VIC	Nick & Christian	9	8	8	25	Runners-up
Dishes		3181				Runners-up
Entrée		Scallops with Black Pudding and Bloody Mary Butter				Runners-up
Seafood Course		Crayfish with Vadouvan Butter and Witlof Salad				Runners-up
Meat Course		Bavette with Red Wine Jus and Truffle				Runners-up
Dessert		3181 Mess (Eton Mess)				Runners-up

== Ratings ==
Colour Key:
– Highest Rating
– Lowest Rating
– Elimination Episode
– Finals Week

Week	Episode		Air date	Viewers (millions) (Note: Ratings data used is from OzTAM and represents the live and same day average viewership from the 5 largest Australian metropolitan centres (Sydney, Melbourne, Brisbane, Perth and Adelaide).)	Nightly rank	Source
1	1	Instant Restaurant 1-1: Tommy & Rach	Monday, 4 September	0.470	12	
1	2	Instant Restaurant 1-2: Sonia & Marcus	Tuesday, 5 September	0.444	10	
1	3	Instant Restaurant 1-3: Radha & Prabha	Wednesday, 6 September	0.486	9	
2	4	Instant Restaurant 1-4: Coco & Pearls	Monday, 11 September	0.558	7	
2	5	Instant Restaurant 1-5: Nick & Christian	Tuesday, 12 September	0.567	6	
2	6	Instant Restaurant 1-6: Claudean & Anthony	Wednesday, 13 September	0.622	6	
3	7	Instant Restaurant 2-1: Aaron & Chris	Monday, 18 September	0.534	9	
3	8	Instant Restaurant 2-2: Claudean & Anthony	Tuesday, 19 September	0.559	8	
3	9	Instant Restaurant 2-3: Amber and Mel	Wednesday, 20 September	0.523	8	
4	10	Instant Restaurant 2-4: Nick and Christian	Thursday, 21 September	0.326 (Note: Melbourne, Perth and Adelaide only.)	13	
4	10	Instant Restaurant 2-4: Nick and Christian	Monday, 25 September	0.190 (Note: Brisbane and Sydney only.)	<20	
4	11	Instant Restaurant 2-5: Sonia & Marcus	Tuesday, 26 September	0.563	8	
4	12	Instant Restaurant 2-6: Patricija & Brigita	Wednesday, 27 September	0.575	7	
5	13	Quarter-final	Sunday, 1 October	0.503	7	
5	14	Semi-final	Monday, 2 October	0.540	8	
5	15	Grand Final	Tuesday, 3 October	0.637	7	
