= Hulled wheat =

Hulled wheat can refer to:

- Einkorn, Triticum monococcum
- Emmer, Triticum dicoccum
- Spelt, Triticum spelta
- Farro, any of the above
