= Zea (bread) =

Greek bread

Zea is a Greek bread made from farro or "zea," as it is known in Greek. The bread is generally chewy and lightweight, with higher dietary fiber content than wheat bread.

== History ==
The grain is thought to have an ancient, if not prehistoric, history in the region. Excavations have found farro grains at prehistoric sites, including in a 12,000 year old Anatolian site. Furthermore, classical texts reference a grain called "zea" or "zeia." Homer used the word Greek word zeidoron (ζείδωρον), which comes from "zea," to mean "life-giving" in the Iliad. He wrote that unripe zea were fed to horses in the Odyssey. Herodotus wrote that the ancient Egyptians preferred zea to wheat or barley in Histories. Dioscorides wrote that Greeks and Romans prepared krimnon, made from ground zea and wheat berries, to make poltos, a porridge-like drink. According to legend, Alexander the Great consumed zea bread to maintain his strength. The medieval harbor at Piraeus, which was named Zea Marina, was potentially named after the grain.

Despite its probable popularity in ancient times, zea was most likely replaced by barley in the classical period. Eventually, durum and wheat became the predominant forms of bread. In Greece, there is an urban legend that zea bread was banned in the 1930s, so that the wheat market would not suffer. However, the reality may have been that wheat was easier to produce, so there was little incentive to be a zea farmer. For many years, zea bread was largely neglected. The closest version to zea food culture was farro in Italy.

In recent years, there has been a revival of zea bread in Greece. While some zea farms existed since the twentieth century, most launched in the early twenty-first century. The majority of these farms use the Italian farro seed, known as "Dikokko Sitari" in Greek. However, some farms use the old grain from historic Greece. There are famous bakeries in Athens, which are known for their zea bread. In addition, Greek recipes sometimes call for zea flour as ingredients.
