= Daktyla =

Greek bread

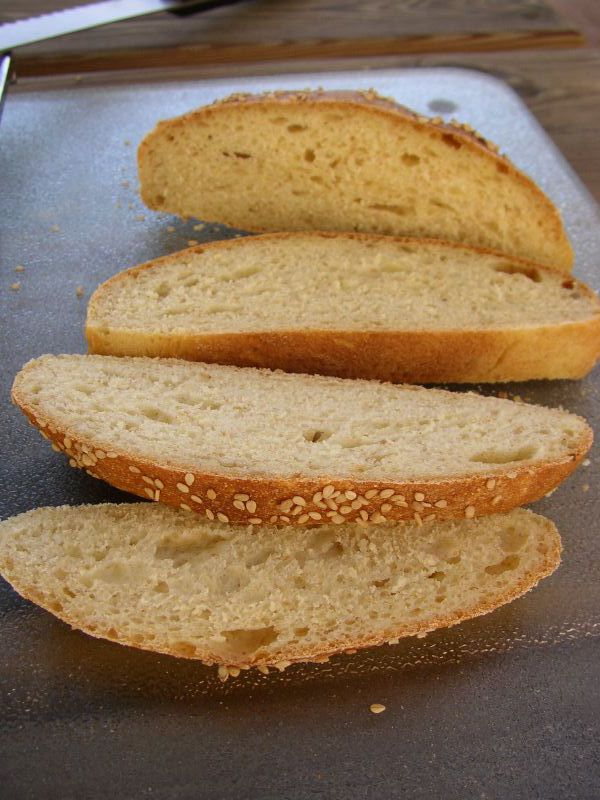
- Type: Bread
- Place of origin: Greece
- Main ingredients: Wheat flours, fine cornmeal

Daktyla (Greek: Δάχτυλα) is a leavened 'country' or 'village' bread from Greece, but also popular in Cyprus and Turkey.

It has a segmented shape resembling fingers of bread, which give it its name of 'finger bread' (Δάχτυλα, Daktyla in Greek means "fingers"), which is made by making deep slashes in a loaf before baking, or making a row of rolls of dough and allowing them to become attached to each other at proving stage. It is traditionally made from a 'country' flour, which is a mix of wheat flours and fine cornmeal, which gives it a light yellow colour, and is topped with sesame and nigella seeds, some recipes also include nigella seeds in the dough.

In Cyprus, the name daktyla is also used for long, thin pastries stuffed with almonds, cinnamon, and sugar, then fried and soaked in a syrup flavored with orange blossom water or rose water.

== See also ==
- Greek cuisine
- List of breads
