= Karydopita =

Greek dessert cake

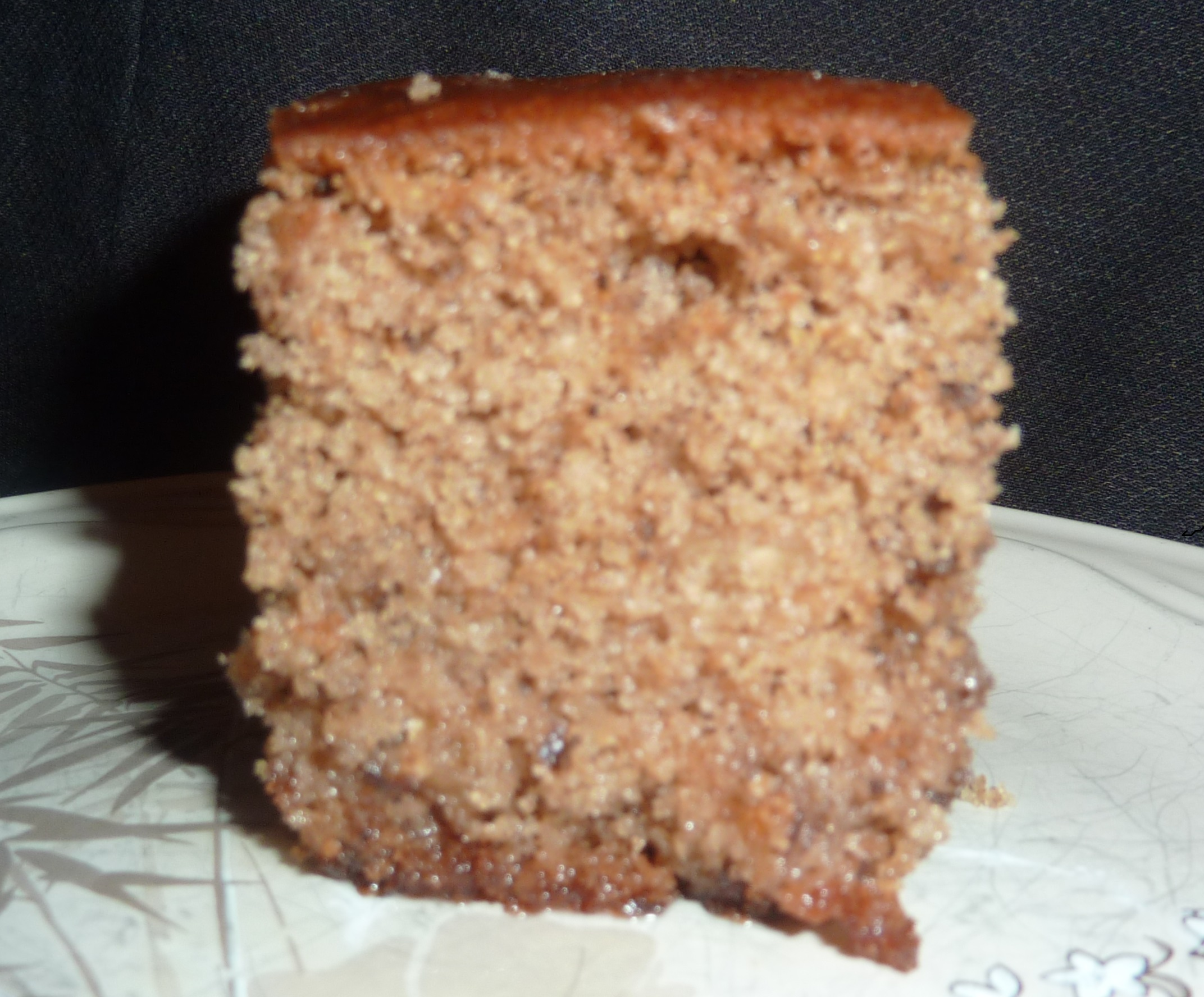
- Karydopita
- Type: Cake
- Place of origin: Greece
- Main ingredients: walnut, flour, cinnamon

Karydopita (Greek: καρυδόπιτα 'walnut pie') is a Greek dessert. A cake made primarily with walnuts and often partly soaked in syrup.

There are several variations of the dish. Common additions include orange zest, cloves, brown sugar, and spiced rum or cognac.

It is one of the most common glyka tapsiou - dessert dishes like pies and breads baked in baking pans. Other common desserts of this style are galaktoboureko, amygdalopita and kadaifi.
