= Saltsa kima =

Greek topping for spaghetti

- Type: Sauce
- Place of origin: Greece
- Main ingredients: Ground beef and tomato
- Ingredients generally used: Cinnamon, allspice, and cloves
- Similar dishes: Cincinnati chili, Coney Island hot dogs

Saltsa kima, Greece's most popular topping for spaghetti, is a ground beef and tomato sauce often spiced with cinnamon, allspice, and cloves. Makaronia me kima (pasta topped with saltsa kima) is the basis for Cincinnati chili and the sauces used to top Coney Island hot dogs, dishes developed by Greek immigrant restaurateurs in the United States in the 1920s.

== See also ==
- Greek cuisine
- Bolognese sauce
