= Gogges =

Type of egg-free pasta from the Peloponnese

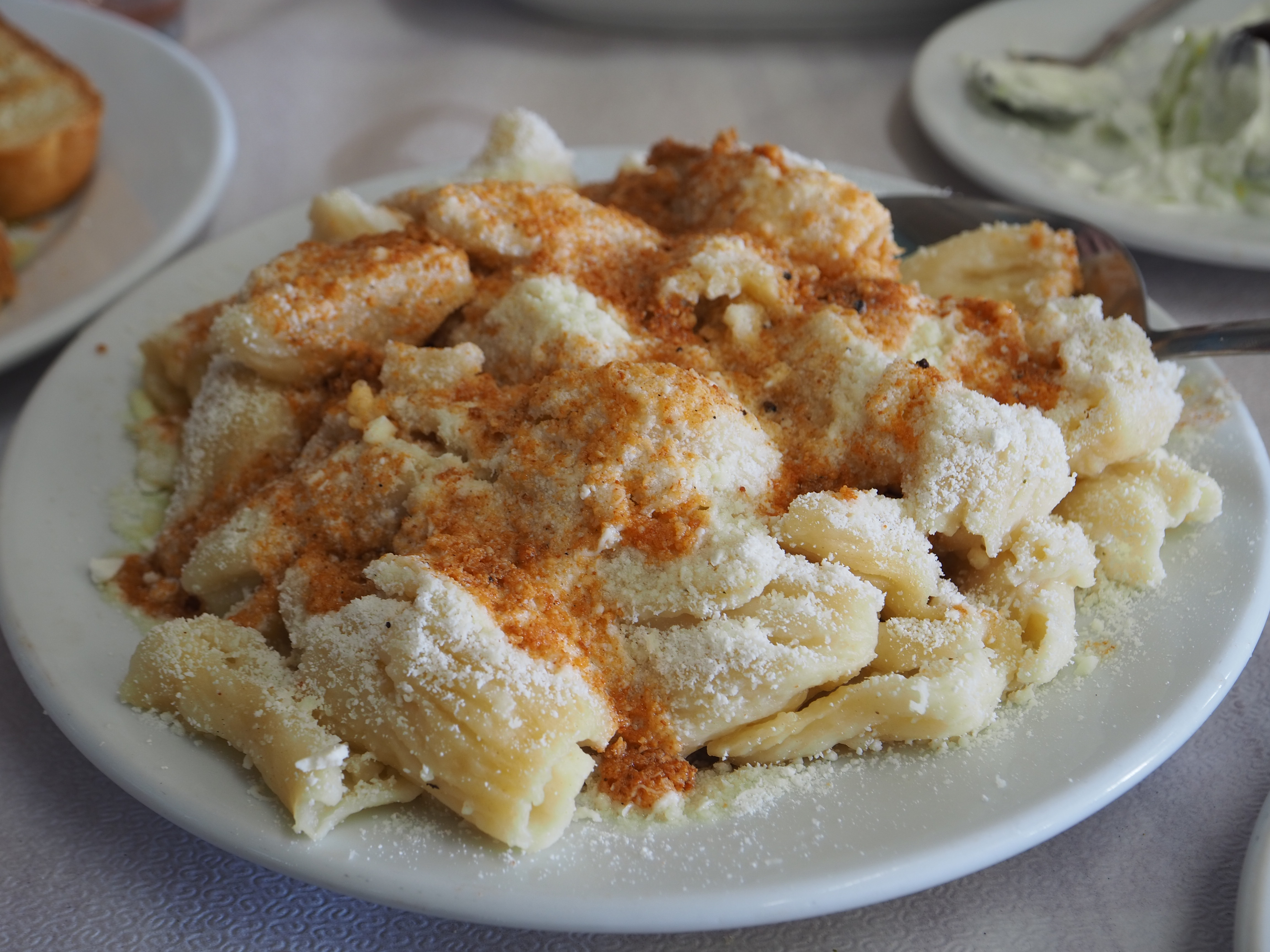
- Alternative names: Goglies, Goggizes, Gogides, Striptá Makaronia
- Type: Pasta
- Place of origin: Greece
- Region or state: Peloponnisos
- Associated cuisine: Greek cuisine
- Main ingredients: flour, salt, water

Making gogges

Gogges (Greek: γκόγκες [ˈɡoɟes]), also called goges, goggizes (γκόγκιζες [ˈɡoɟizes]), goglies (γκόγκλιες), and stripta makaronia (στριπτά μακαρόνια, 'twisted macaroni') is a type of egg-free pasta made in the Peloponnese, especially the provinces of Argolis and Laconia. They resemble seashells and are similar to cavatelli or orecchiette as made in Apulia, though gogges are usually thicker. Gogges are generally made only from flour, water, and salt.

They are made by first rolling the dough out into cylinders roughly the thickness of the little finger, then cutting the cylinder into sections 3–4 cm (1.2–1.6 in) in length. In the final step each section is pressed flat and curled, in one fluid motion using the fingers. The rolling can be done on any surface, but is usually done on grooved wooden board to give the pasta its exterior texture. If not consumed fresh they are left to dry between two clean linen sheets for 2-3 days.

Traditionally, gogges were made fresh for the celebrations of Tiriní (Τυρινή, 'cheese week'), during Apókries (Απόκριες 'Carnival'), in which the consumption of cheese, dairy, and oil are celebrated before the Lenten fast. For Tiriní, they are served as a snack or meze with oil and mizithra, though at other times of the year, they are served as a main dish. Today, though still commonly made at home by hand, they are commercially produced in local pasta factories and served in taverns and restaurants.
