= Amygdalopita =

Almond cake from Greek cuisine

Amygdalopita (Greek: αμυγδαλόπιτα 'almond pie') is a Greek almond cake made with ground almonds, flour, butter, and eggs, and often topped with pastry cream.

It is one of the most common glyka tapsiou (Greek: γλυκά ταψιού), dessert prepared in baking pans like galaktoboureko, karydopita and kadaifi.

== Preparation ==
The dry ingredients are folded into creamed butter and sugar, then the eggs are beaten in. The cake is baked in a baking pan, soaked in simple syrup, and allowed to cool before it is cut into squares.

== See also ==
- List of cakes
- Basbousa
