= Fanouropita =

Traditional sweet cake from Greek/Cypriot cuisine

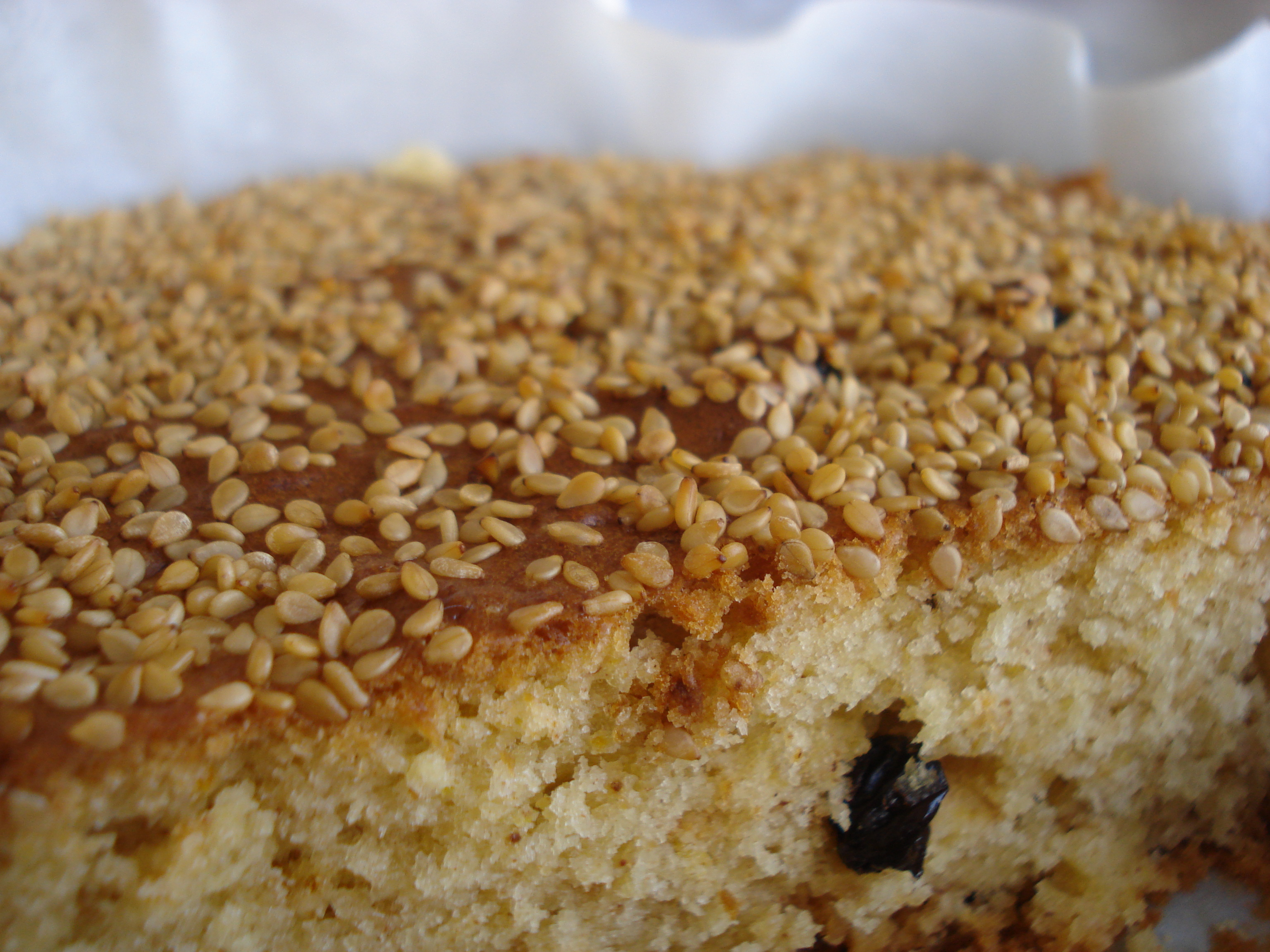
- Type: Cake
- Place of origin: Greece, Cyprus
- Cooking time: 60 minutes
- Main ingredients: flour
- Similar dishes: vasilopita

Fanouropita is a sweet cake recipe from Greek cuisine and is traditionally a lenten cake, also called "lost and found cake." It is traditionally served on St. Fanourios' feast day on August 27, given to Greek Orthodox believers as a blessing.

Fanouropita is oil-based and does not contain any butter or eggs so that it can be eaten on holy fasting days. Believers offer the cake expecting "revelations" on objects or people, or to find something they are looking for.

When made without raisins and walnuts the cake will be more crumbly, similar to the texture of biscotti. To achieve a cake like texture, add both raisins and walnuts. Modern recipes suggest substituting with different kinds of nuts (almonds, cashews) or different kinds of dried fruit (dates, dried figs, and so on) if you do not have raisins and walnuts or do not wish to add them.

== Etymology ==
The name fanouropita is derived from the patron saint of Rhodes, Saint Phanourios. His name translates in Greek as "the one who discloses" (Greek verb: "φαίνω"). He is the saint of "lost things".

== Origin ==
The tradition of fanouropita originated around 1500 AD, or 1355-1369 AD, to venerate the icon of Saint Fanourios when he was discovered untouched between ruins in Rhodes or Cyprus. In local Orthodox tradition, Saint Fanourios has been since known as the patron saint of lost objects. When a lost object is revealed or found, followers of Saint Fanourios have often baked Propitiation in memory of his mother. His mother was known as a cruel sinner, sent to hell because of her shameful life. Fanourios prayed that her soul would be saved, begging God for her salvation.

== Description ==
Fanouropita is usually 25-30 cm diameter. It is puffy, oily, aromatic, and sometimes powdered with sifted white sugar.

== Ingredients ==
Fanouropita traditionally consists of seven, nine, or eleven ingredients, the number varying by region. In its simplest version, propitiation has only seven ingredients. The essential, most common ingredients are: flour, vegetable oil, sugar, orange juice, baking powder, nuts, and raisins. Other ingredients may include cinnamon, cloves, soda, and water.

== Tradition ==
Fanouropita is blessed in church and its pieces are offered to people. According to tradition, it is offered for the forgiveness of Saint Fanourios' mother, a sinful woman who was cruel towards the poor.

== In popular culture ==
In various areas of Greece and Cyprus, the tradition is followed by Orthodox Christians asking Saint Fanourios to "reveal" a job to the unemployed, to salvage an item that was lost, or to give health and find a groom for unmarried girls.

== See also ==
- Vasilopita
- List of pies
