= Tentura =

Liqueur produced in the Greek city of Patras

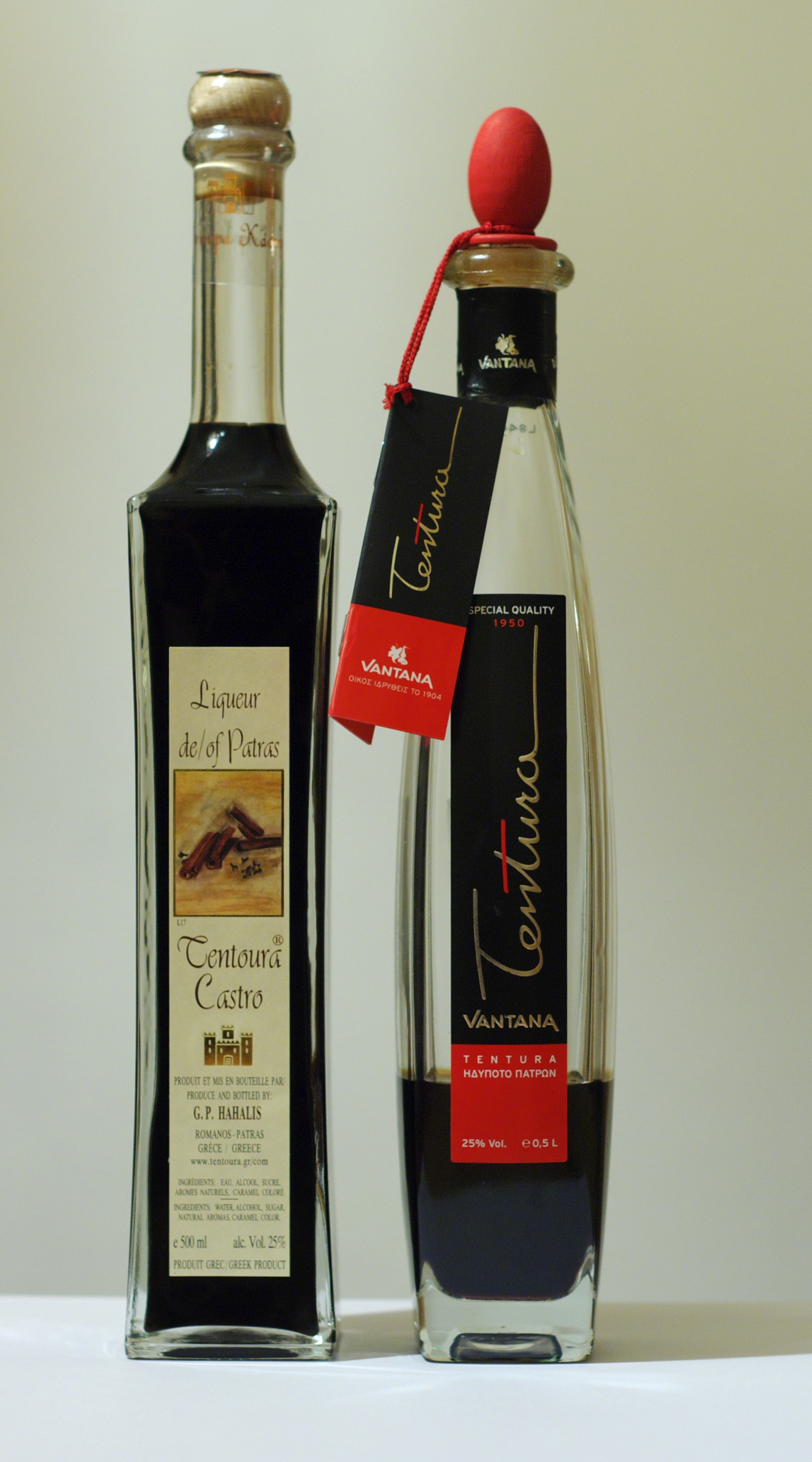
- Bottle of Tentura
- Type: Liqueur
- Origin: Greece
- Alcohol by volume: 24%
- Flavour: cinnamon

Tentura (Greek: τεντούρα, from Venetian tentura 'tincture'), also spelled Tentoura, Tintura, or Tintoura, is a liqueur produced in the Greek city of Patras since the 15th century. It is prepared by sweetening and flavoring various types of distillate alcohol with herbs and spices; thus the name tentura which comes from the Italian word tinctura ('tincture'). Brandy from Patras' wineries is the most common alcoholic base for tentura, though sometimes rum or grain alcohol are used as well. The fermented essences of cloves, cinnamon, nutmeg, and citrus fruits are the most common flavoring agents. These aromatic ingredients give tentura its distinctive dark orange-red color and its alternative local name μοσχοβολήθρα (moschovolithra, lit. 'she who throws scent'). It has an alcohol content of around 25% by volume.

It is most often served chilled or over ice in a small glass after a large meal as a digestif. It is also added to espresso coffee, which is then called espresso corretto. It is also served at room temperature.
