= Noumboulo =

Cured pork tenderloin

- Type: Charcuterie
- Region or state: Corfu
- Serving temperature: Thinly sliced
- Main ingredients: Pork tenderloin
- Ingredients generally used: Salt, spices, and wine

Noumboulo (from Venetian nombolo: loin) is a traditional charcuterie product of the Island of Corfu. It is made from whole pork tenderloin, cured with salt and spices and marinated in wine. It is then encased in natural intestine, usually together with a strip of fat, and smoked over a mixture of herbs including sage, bay laurel, thyme, terebinth, and myrtle. It is consumed thinly sliced, usually on fresh bread.

Although it is enjoyed all year round, it is traditionally served as an hors d’oeuvre on Christmas and New Year's days.
