= Tsigareli =

Tsigareli (Greek: Τσιγαρέλι) is cabbage with fresh tomato, red spicy peppers, potatoes and herbs like dill and parsley. It is a dish found mostly in Corfu.
