= Pastitsada =

Greek dish of braised meat over pasta

- Alternative names: Pastitsada Korfiatiki, Pastitsado
- Region or state: Corfu
- Associated cuisine: Greece
- Main ingredients: Spicy veal, beef or poultry and macaroni
- Ingredients generally used: Olive oil, onions, garlic (though traditionally not used in this dish in Corfu), salt, black pepper, white wine, vinegar, cloves, bay leaf, cinnamon, tomatoes, butter, kefalotyri or Parmesan

Pastitsada (παστιτσάδα) is a Greek dish of meat braised in a spicy tomato-based sauce and served over pasta. Often associated with the island of Corfu, where it is a traditional Sunday dinner, it is sometimes called pastitsada Korfiatiki.

Pastitsada is based on veal, beef or poultry cooked in fresh or canned tomatoes, olive oil, minced onions, garlic, salt, black pepper, white wine, vinegar, cloves, bay leaf, cinnamon, butter and served over pasta. It is usually topped with grated kefalotyri or Parmesan cheese. The dish shows Italian influence.

The name comes from the Venetian pastizzada (standard Italian pasticciata) lit. 'something messed up', which is used for a large variety of Italian braised meat dishes, generally served with polenta, mashed potatoes, or pasta.
