= Spanakorizo =

Greek vegetarian dish of spinach and rice

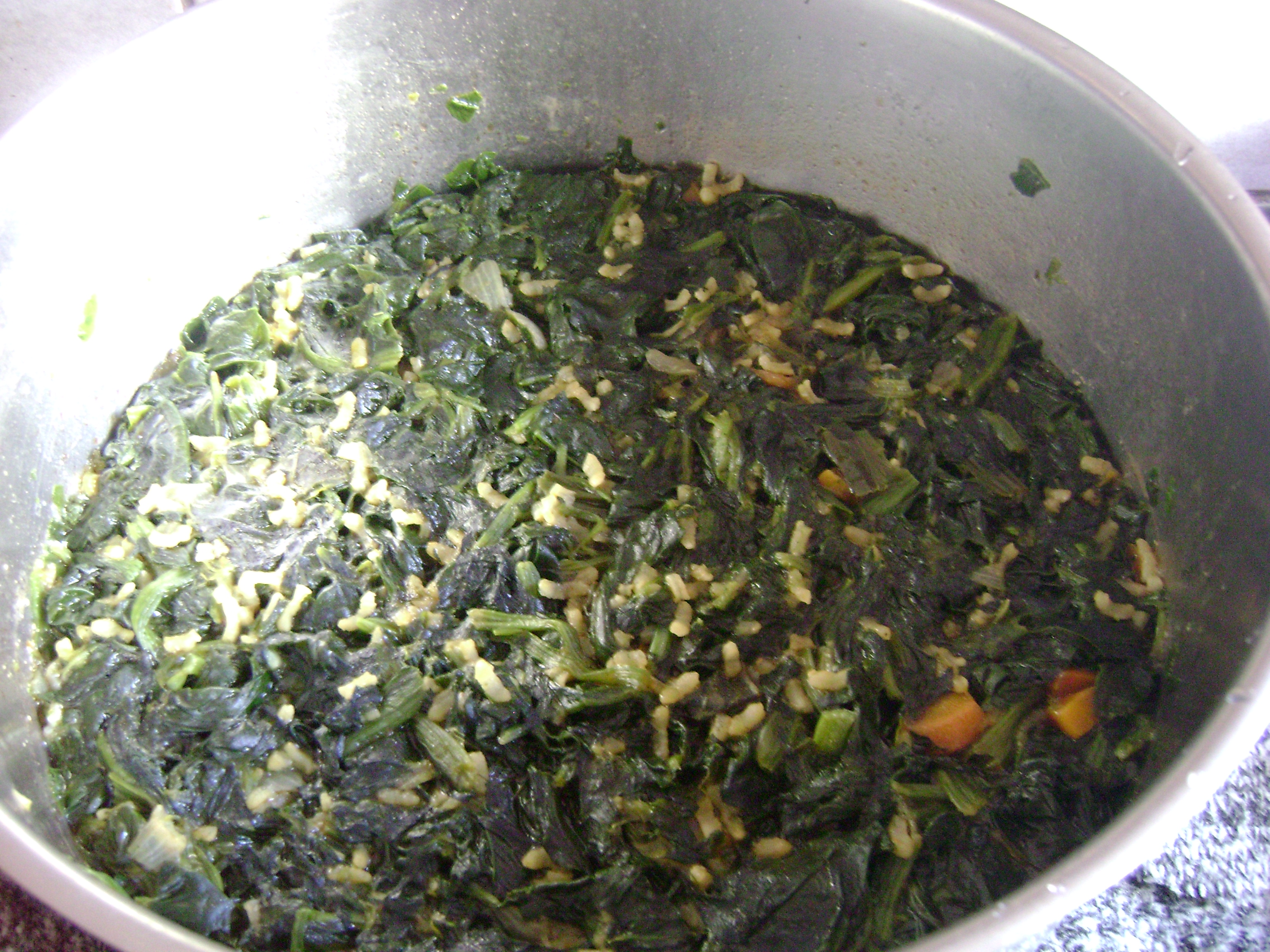
- Type: Stew
- Course: Main
- Place of origin: Greece
- Serving temperature: Hot or Cold
- Main ingredients: Spinach, rice, feta cheese, lemon

Spanakorizo (Greek: σπανακόρυζο, "spinach rice") is a Greek vegetarian dish of spinach and rice. A pilaf, it is described as a typical Greek country dish that may be eaten hot or cold.

A typical recipe includes long-grain rice and fresh spinach along with dill, fresh mint, salt, black pepper, onion, and olive oil, often served with feta cheese and lemon. Wine pairings that have been suggested are simple white wines such as Tsantali Agiorgitiko, Boutari Lac des Roches, or retsina.
