= Farro =

Dried wheat grains

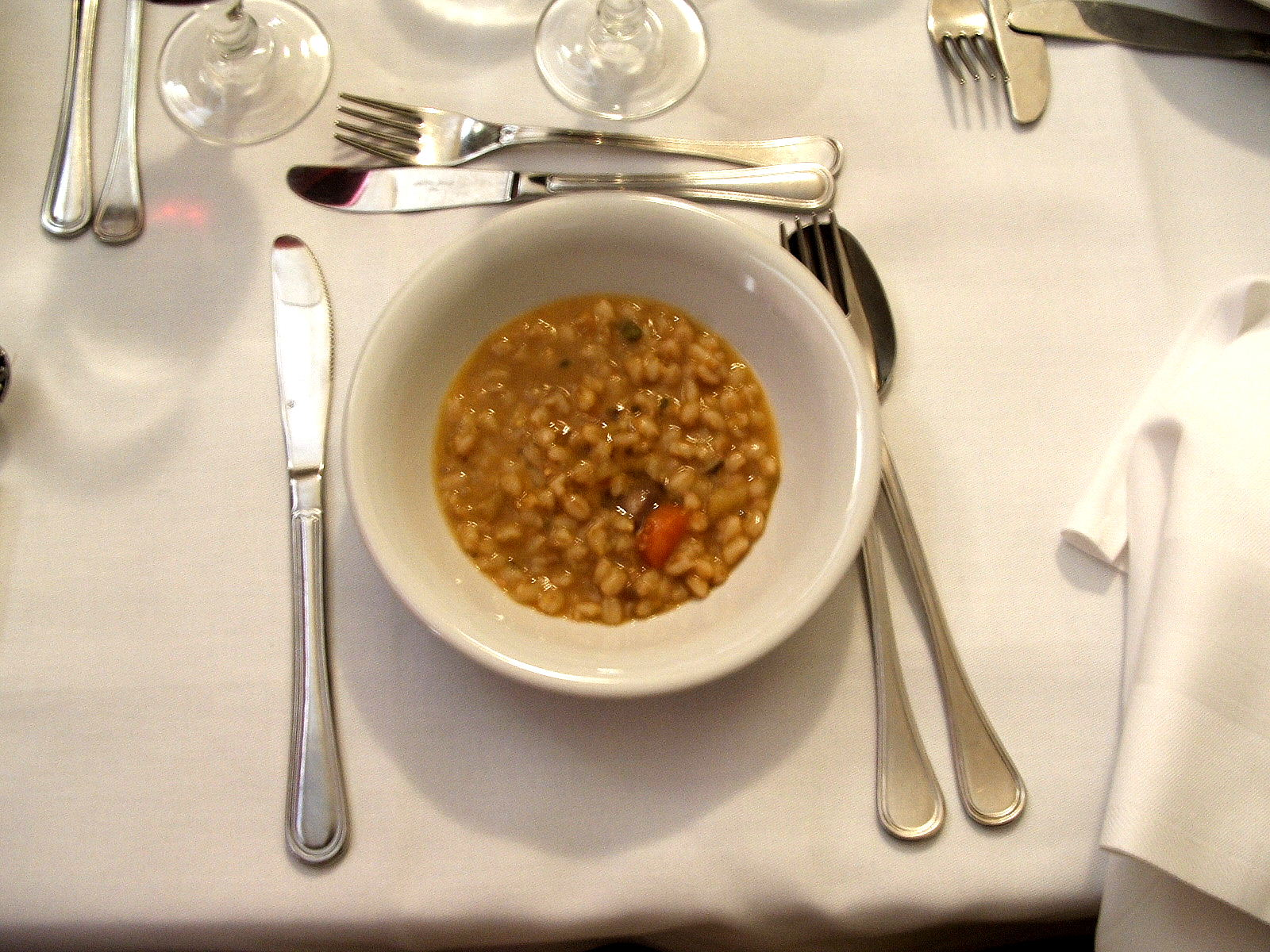
Farro soup from Tuscany, Italy

Farro (/ˈfæroʊ/) is a grain of any of three species of hulled wheat, namely einkorn, emmer, or spelt, sold dried and cooked in water until soft. It is used as a side dish and added to salads, soups and stews.

== Etymology ==
The English word is borrowed directly from Italian farro, first documented in English in 1828 when the botanist Samuel Frederick Gray mentioned it. It derives from Latin far, farris (spelt, grain).

== Origin ==
Farro originated in the Fertile Crescent. Grains have been found in archaeological sites from 17,000 BCE and 7700 BCE in modern day Israel and Syria, respectively.

== Description ==
Farro is made from any of three species of hulled wheat (those that retain their husks tightly and cannot be threshed): spelt (Triticum spelta), emmer (Triticum dicoccum), and einkorn (Triticum monococcum). In Italian cuisine, the three species are sometimes distinguished as farro grande, farro medio, and farro piccolo (large, medium, and small farro, respectively).

Emmer is the most common variety of farro grown in Italy, specifically in certain mountain regions of Tuscany and Abruzzo. It is considered to be of higher quality for cooking than the other two grains and thus is sometimes called "true" farro.

Confusion about the terminology for these three wheat varieties is generated by the difficult history in the taxonomy of wheat and by colloquial and regional uses of the term farro. For example, emmer grown in the Garfagnana region of Tuscany is locally known as farro. Some English speakers use farro to mean steamed or boiled grain presented as salad and similar dishes, whereas in Italy it means the three grains, individually or together. Farro is sometimes translated as "spelt" in English, but this is only one of three possibilities.

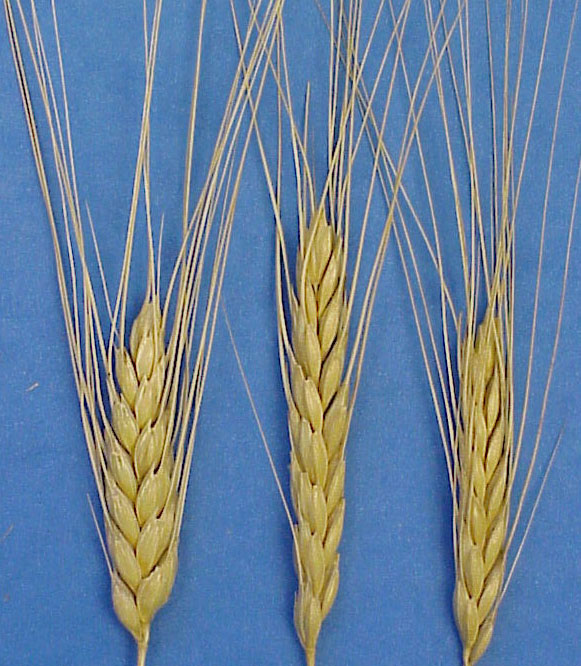
Triticum dicoccum, emmer wheat, produces what is sometimes called "true" farro.

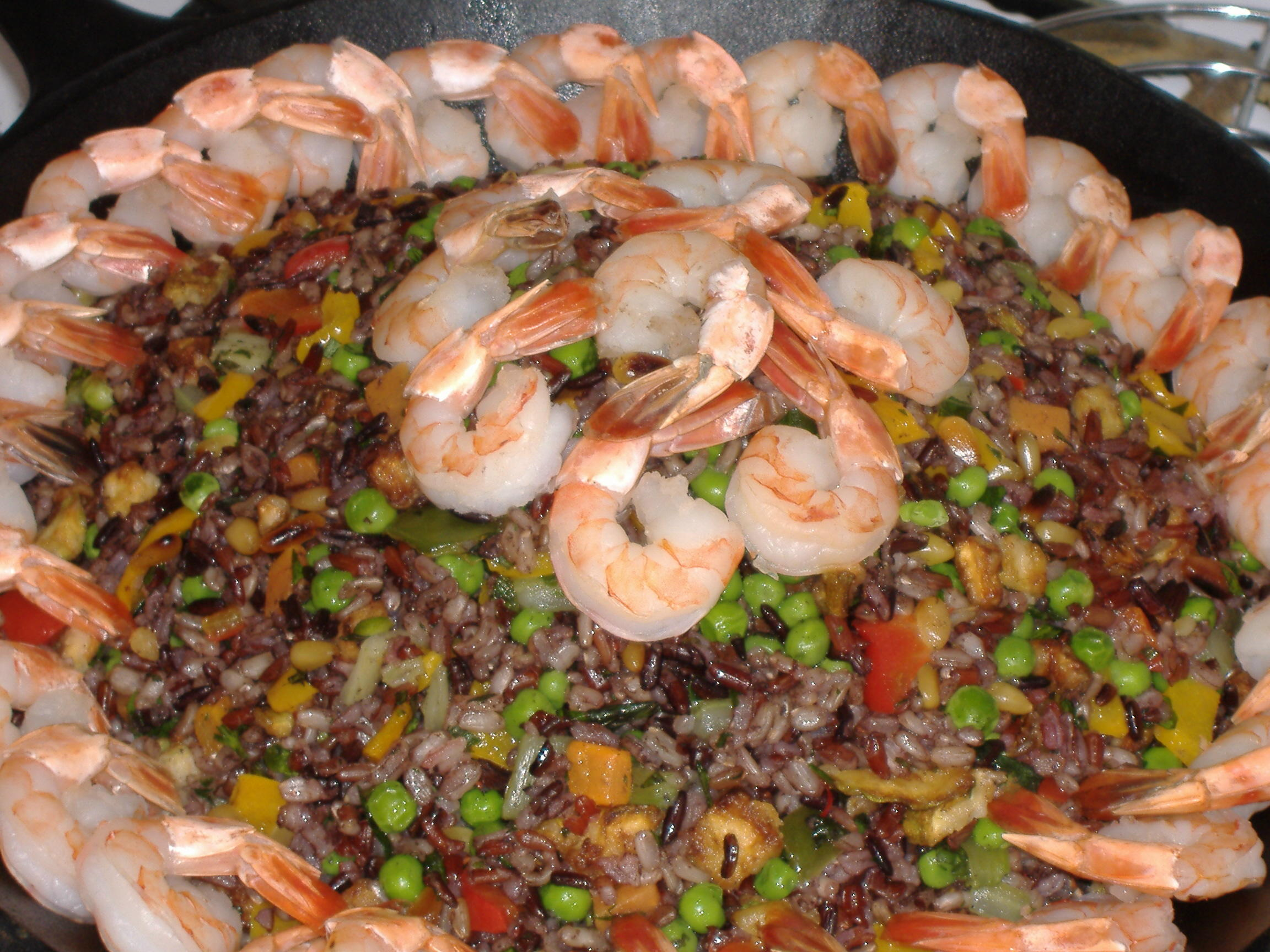
Shrimp in farro salad

== See also ==
- List of ancient dishes and foods
