= Greek Macedonian cuisine =

Greek regional cuisine

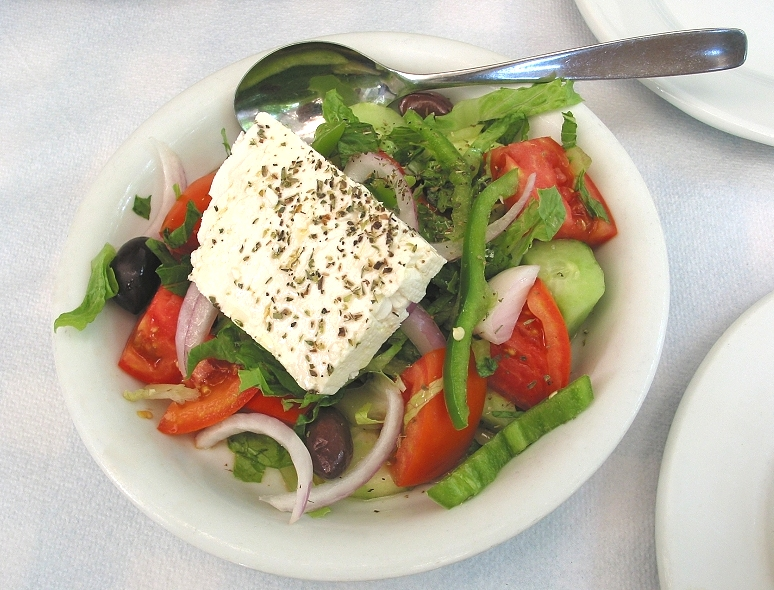
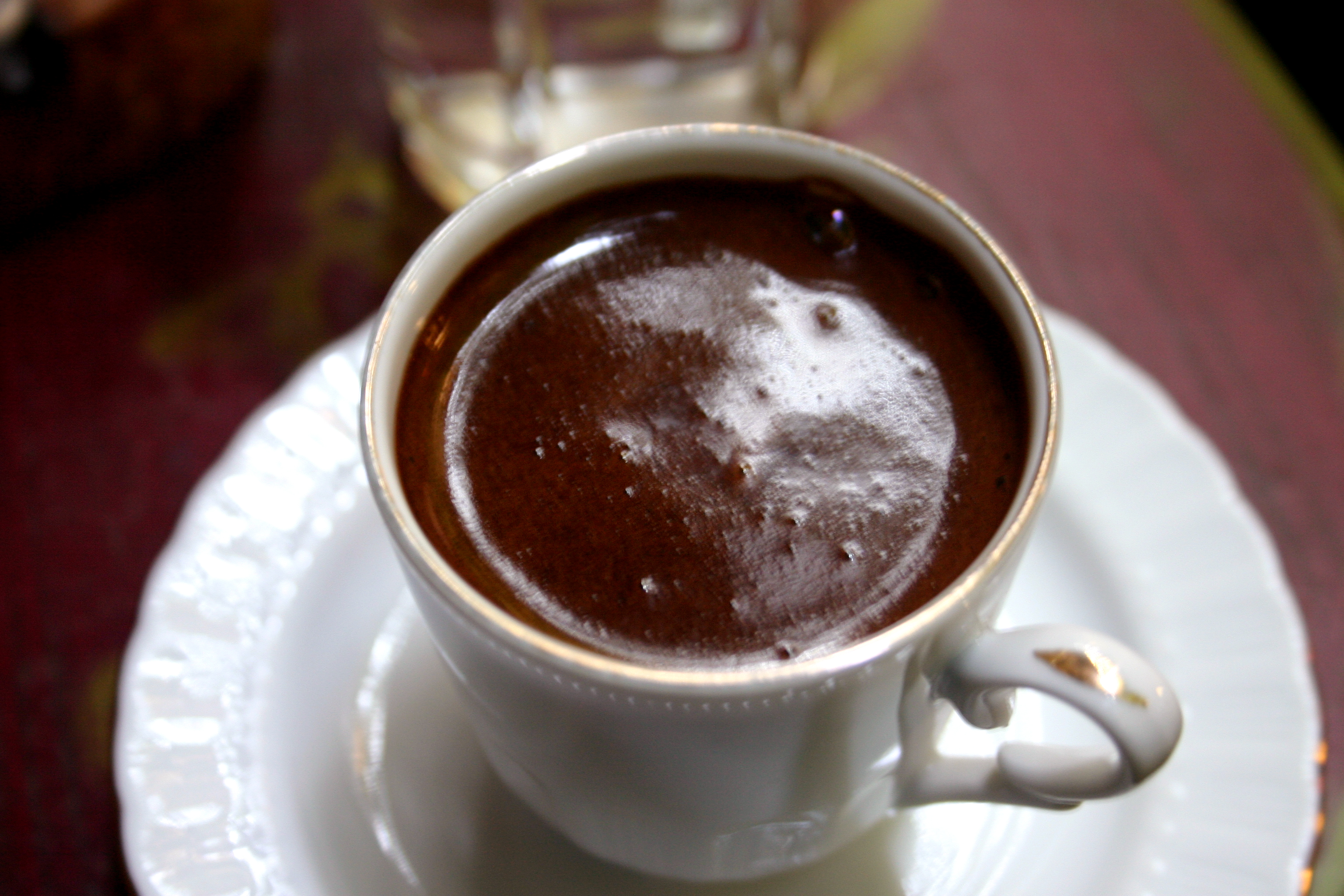
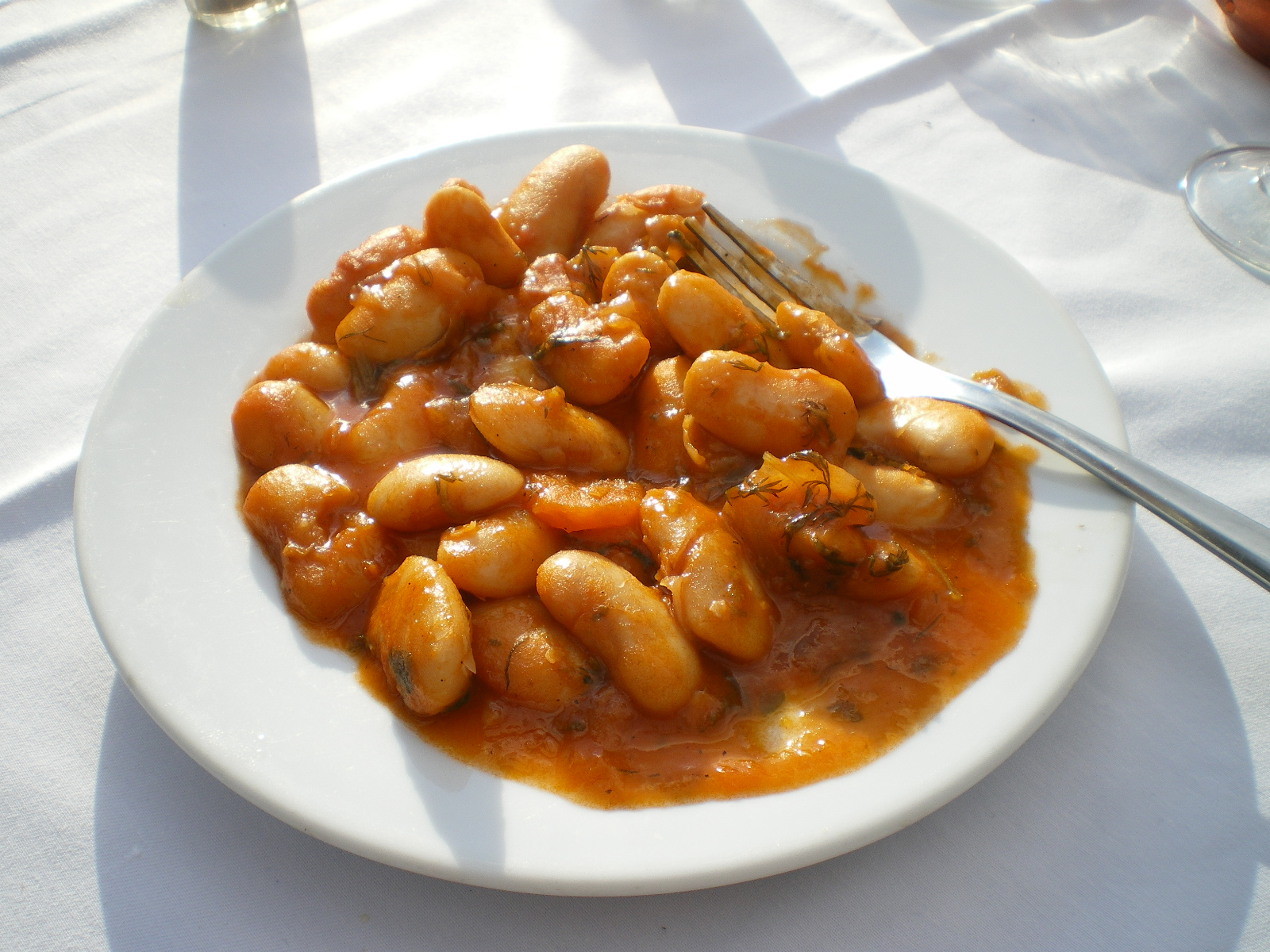
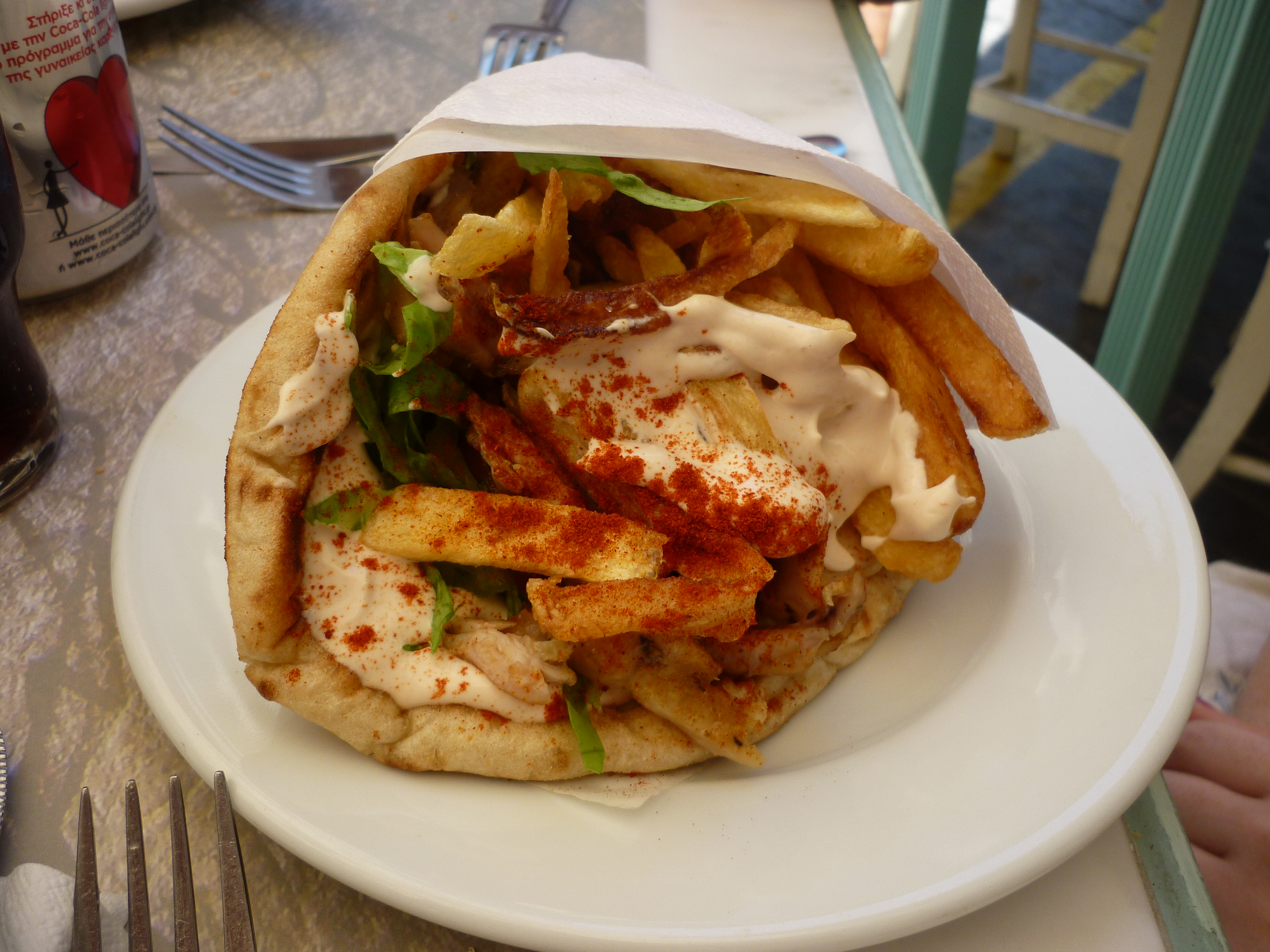

The cusinine of Greek Macedonia (Greek: Μακεδονική κουζίνα) is the cuisine of the region of Macedonia in Greece. Contemporary Greek Macedonian cooking shares much with general Greek, wider Balkan and Mediterranean cuisine, and inherits from Ottoman cuisine. From all the communities that have settled in the region main specific gastronomic influences include dishes of the Asia Minor Greek, Aromanian and Megleno-Romanian, Pontic Greek, Slavic, Armenian and Sephardi Jewish populations.

Contemporary Greek-Macedonian cuisine has developed in recent years, with several initiatives from the state, private food companies and restaurants receiving distinctions.

== History ==
A continuation from the ancient period are dishes such as lamb cooked with vegetables and goat cooked in olive oil: modern recipes from Kavala to Kastoria and Kozani offer lamb with quince, pork with celery or leeks.

The arrival of Greek refugees from Asia Minor and Constantinople in the early 20th century brought Anatolian and Constantinopolitan elements to the region. Thessaloniki had a major Sephardic Jewish community since the late 15th century, bringing with it the culinary tradition of Sephardic Jewish cuisine. The monastic community of Mount Athos has its distinctive cuisine using bread, olive oil, wine, olives and vegetables. Thessaloniki is a UNESCΟ City of Gastronomy, and was the first Greek city to join the UNESCO Creative Cities Network for Gastronomy.

Some specialties are trahanas with pork cracklings, filo-based pies (cheese, leek, spinach) and meat dishes using pork, wild boar and buffalo. Others are tyrokafteri (a spicy cheese spread) and soupies krasates (cuttlefish in wine).

Unlike in Athens, pita bread for souvlaki usually is not toasted on a grill, but fried on a griddle. Various products are produced from buffalo meat, which are raised especially around Lake Kerkini.

== Local products ==
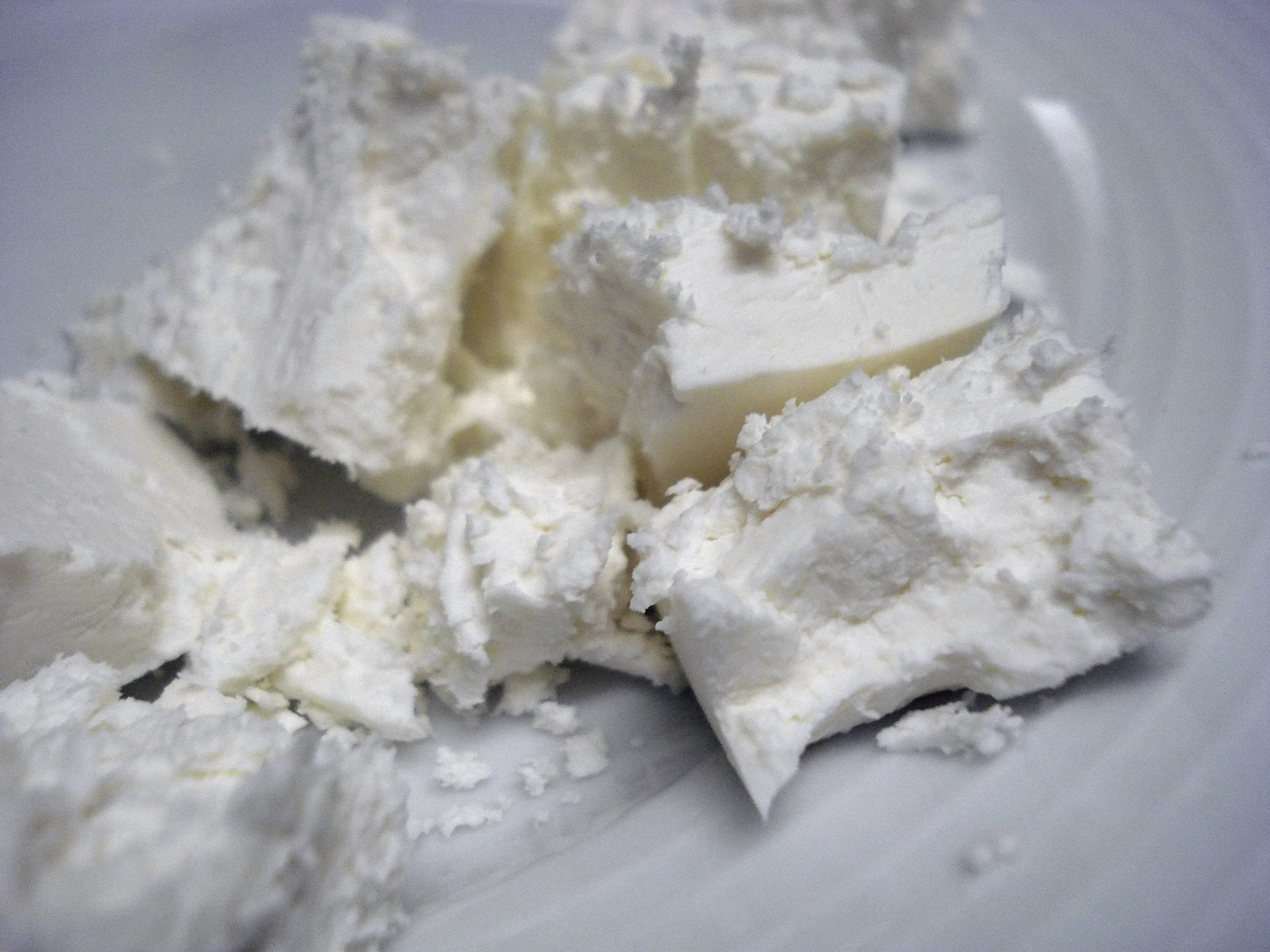
Manouri

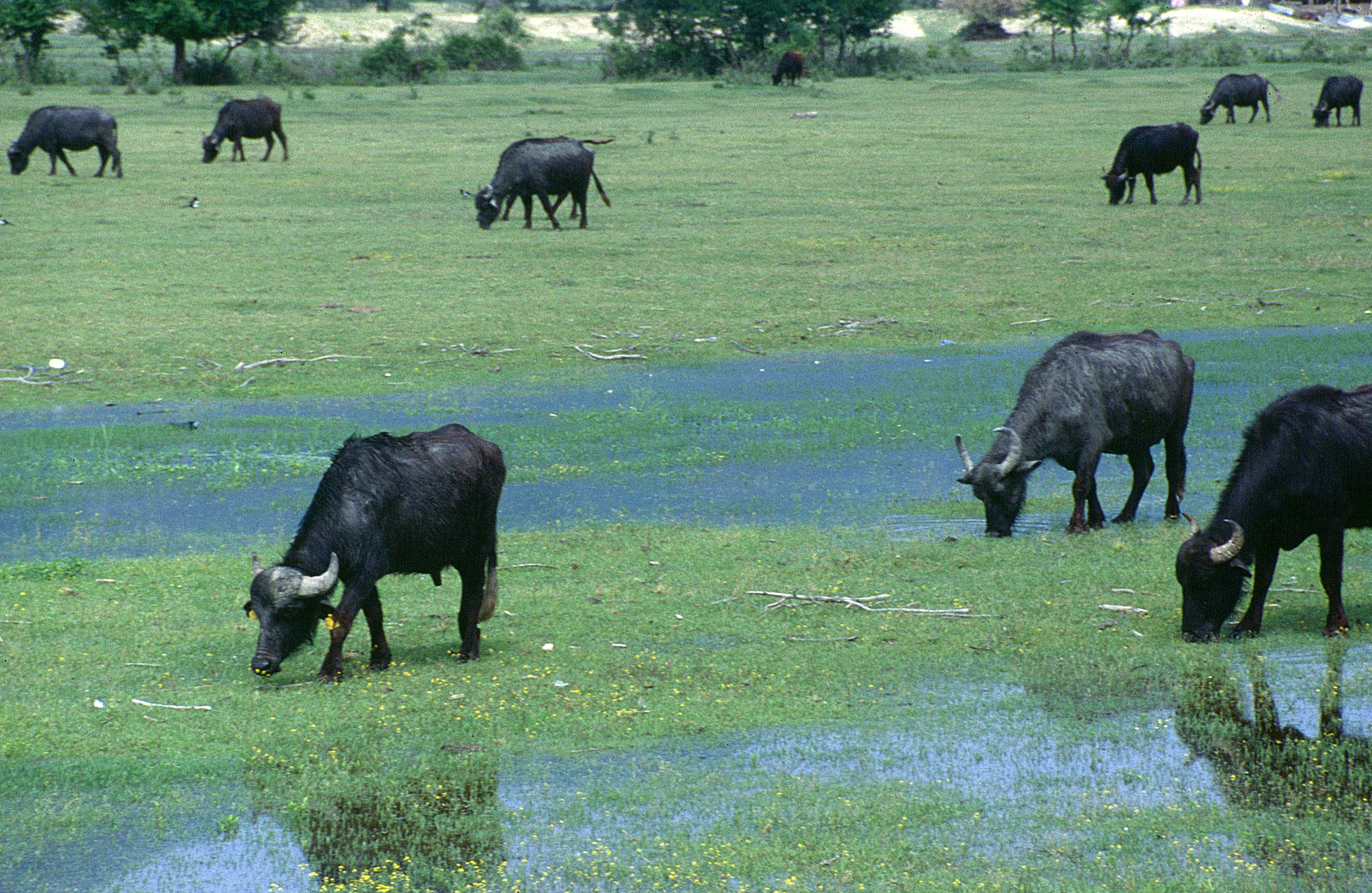
Buffalos breeding in Lake Kerkini

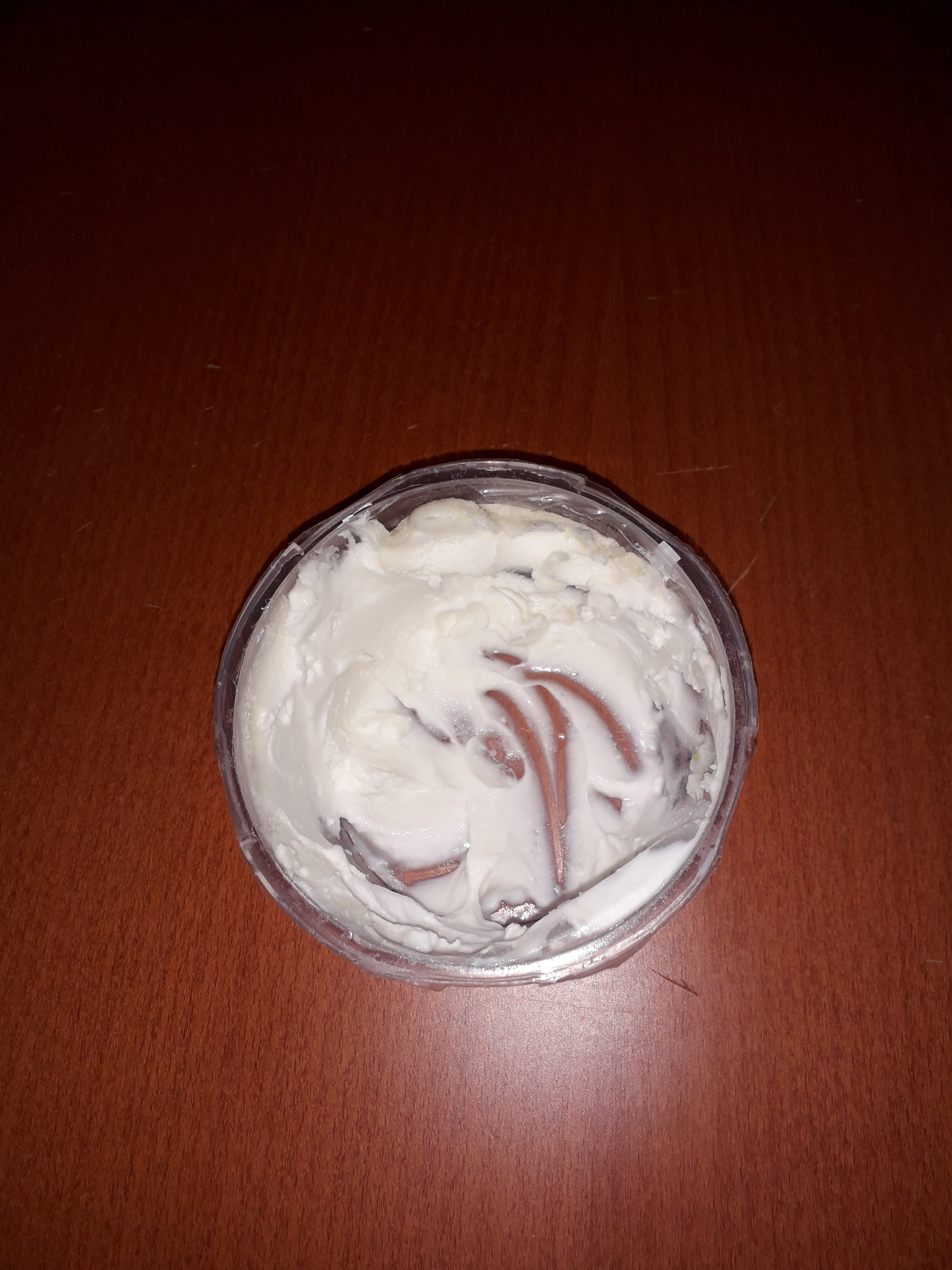
Anevato creamy cheese

Selected local products include the following, many of which are certified as Protected Designation of Origin (PDO) products:

- Pligouri,
- Kiwi of Pieria,
- Apple of Kastoria
- Peach of Naoussa,
- Krokos Kozanis (saffron)
- Potato of Kato Nevrokopi,
- Crispy cherries of Rodochori,
- Olive oil of Thasos
- Green olives of Chalkidiki,
- Throumba olives of Thasos,
- Agourelaio olive oil of Chalkidiki,
- Beans Gigantes-Elefantes of Prespa, Kastoria, Kato Nevrokopi
- Beans Plake Megalosperma of Prespa, Kato Nevrokopi
- Lagana, bread
- Paximathia, rusks
- Ifkadia, the Thracian version of the pappardelle pasta
- Couscous, the handmade couscous of Kalampaki.
- Koulouri Thessalonikis, sesame bread ring (a type of simit).
- Pinakoti, bread from Mount Athos in Chalkidiki.
- Mussels, of Makrygialos, Pieria.
- Mushrooms, of Grevena region.
- Petroto, cheese of Chalkidiki
- Anevato, cheese of Grevena and Kozani
- Kefalograviera, cheese of Florina, Grevena, Kastoria, Kozani
- Mpatzos, cheese of Chalkidiki, Florina, Grevena, Imathia, Kastoria, Kilkis, Kozani, Pella, Thessaloniki
- Manouri, cheese of Chalkidiki, Florina, Grevena, Imathia, Kastoria, Kilkis, Kozani, Pella, Pieria, Thessaloniki
- Feta, cheese of Chalkidiki, Florina, Grevena, Imathia, Kastoria, Kilkis, Kozani, Pella, Pieria, Serres, Thessaloniki
- Kasseri, cheese of Chalkidiki, Florina, Grevena, Imathia, Kastoria, Kilkis, Kozani, Pella, Pieria, Serres, Thessaloniki

== Appetizers ==
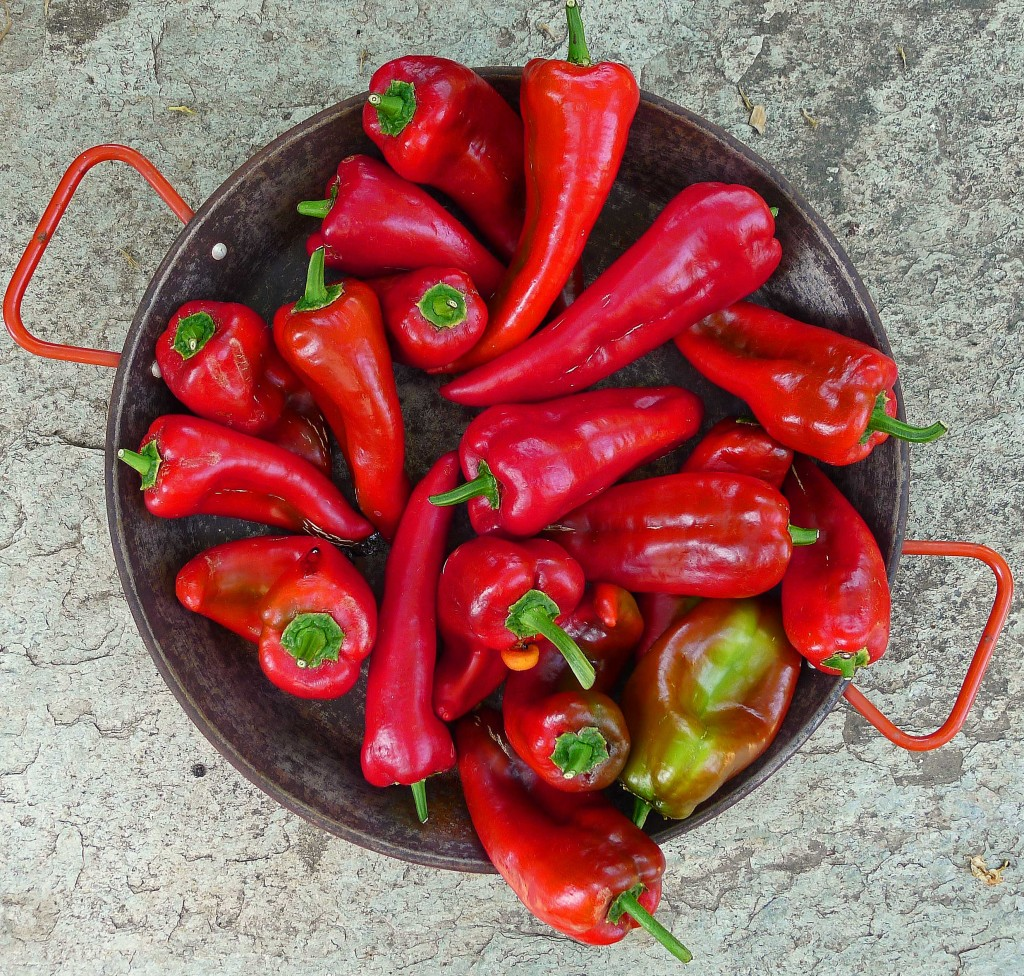
Florina peppers

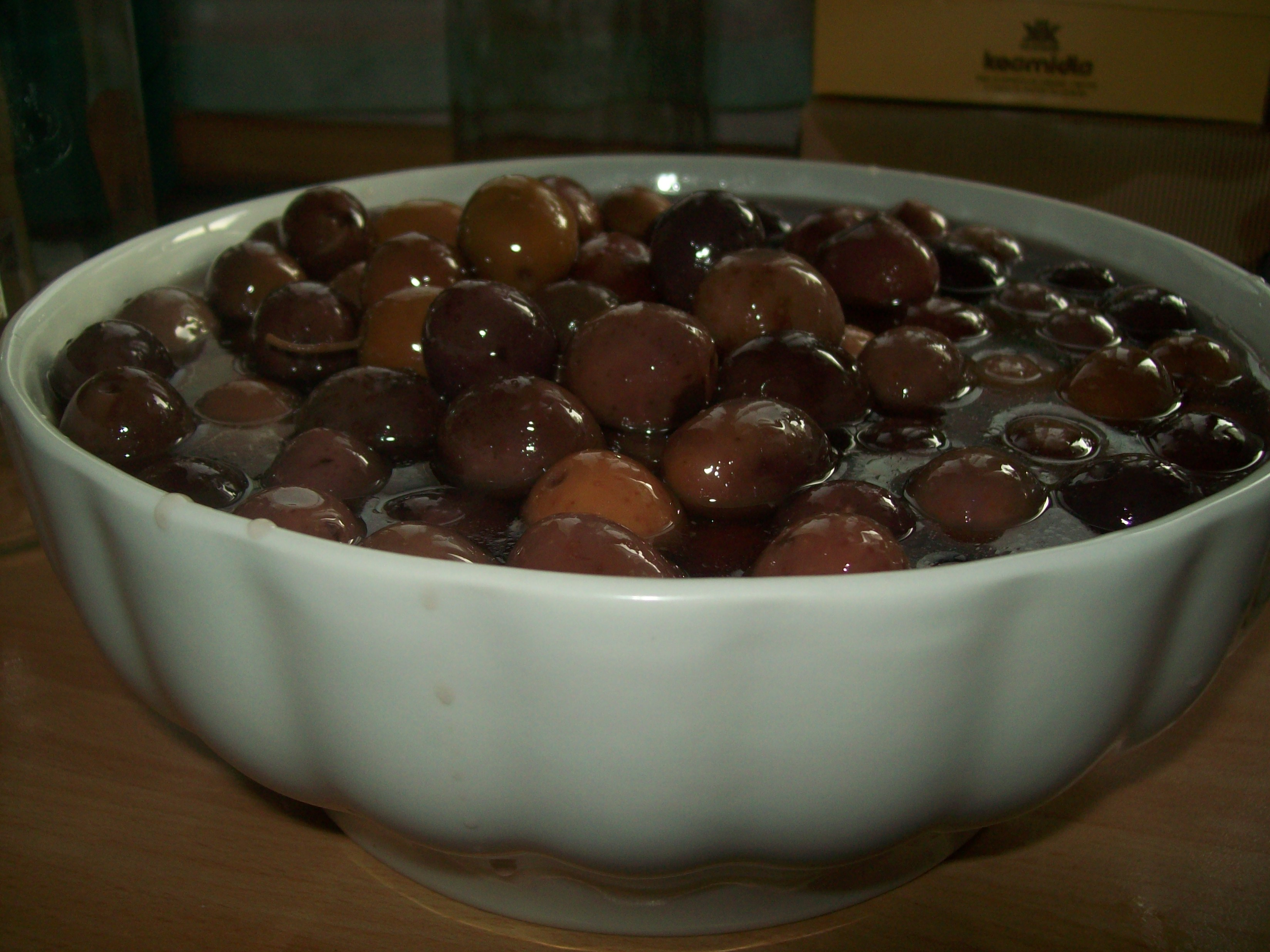
Greek olives

Selected appetizers:

- Atzem pilaf, from Vertiskos
- Eggs Vlachika,
- Foustoroun with Kavourmas, type of omelette
- Gkaikanas, type of omelette from Naoussa
- Fried Bahovite peppers (Aridaia peppers), from Pella
- Gavopsara Naoussa, eggplants roasted in salt water with mustard from Imathia
- Itsli Kefte, Icli Kofte (Kibbeh), Itsli Meatball.
- Kichí of Kozani, a type of cheese pie (tyropita).
- Kolobarina, Kolokythopita without filo from Chalkidiki
- Manitaropita, mushrooms pie
- Mpoumpari,
- Patatokeftedes, patato fritters
- Perek pie, feta cheese pie from Pontic Greek cuisine
- Pickled Macedonian green peppers, short green peppers in brine also known as piperakia
- Red peppers of Florina, it can be roasted, sliced and served by adding olive oil and garlic
- Red pumpkin with mpatzos.
- Saganaki, fried kefalograviera cheese
- Siron with paskitan and garlic, from Pontic Greek cuisine
- Tabbouleh salad,
- Tanomenos sorvas, yogurt type of soup from Pontic Greek cuisine
- Tomato Triantafyllo, one tomato stuffed of chopped onion, olive oil, oregano, parsley, olives

== Specialties ==
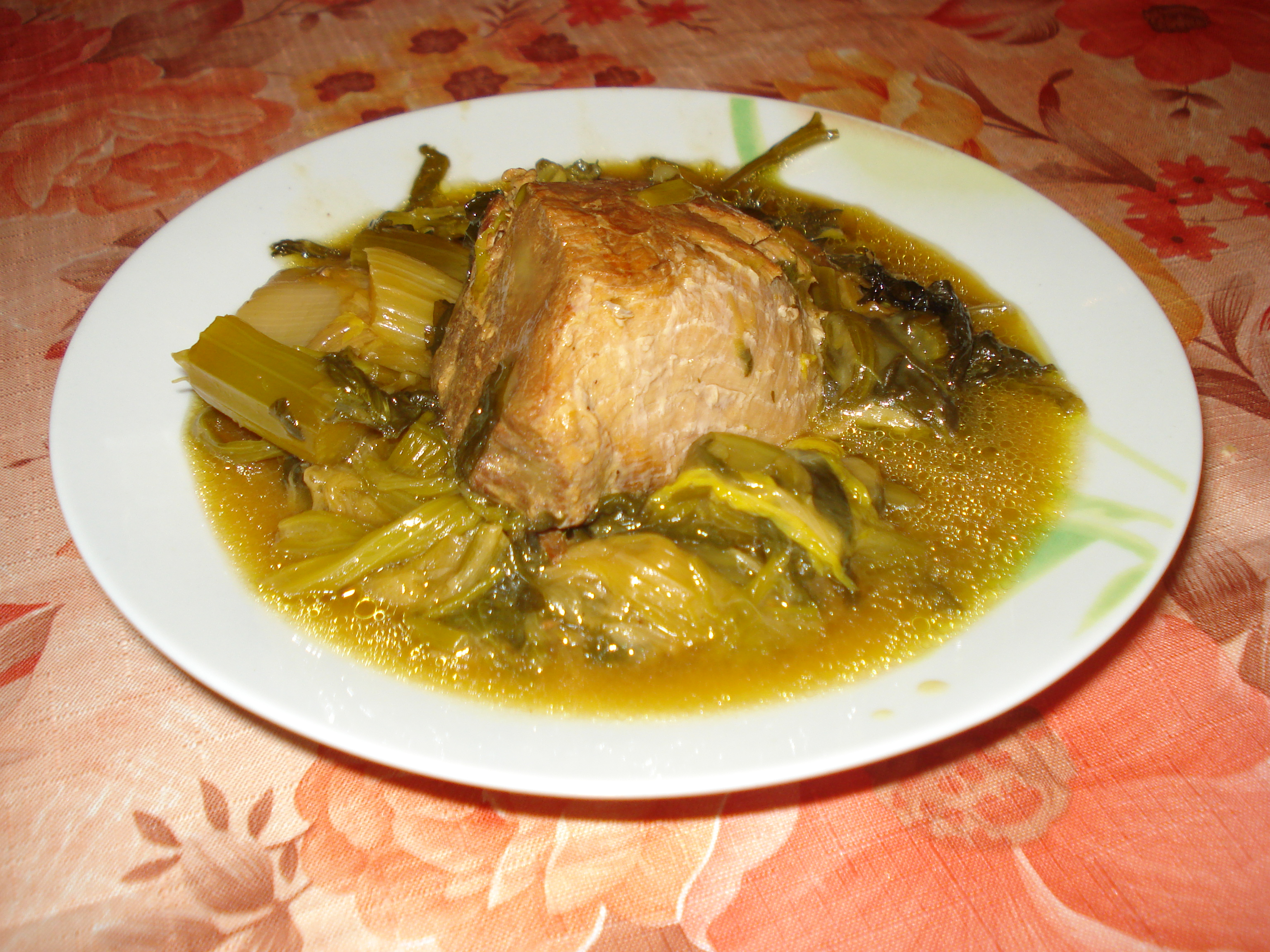
Pork with celery

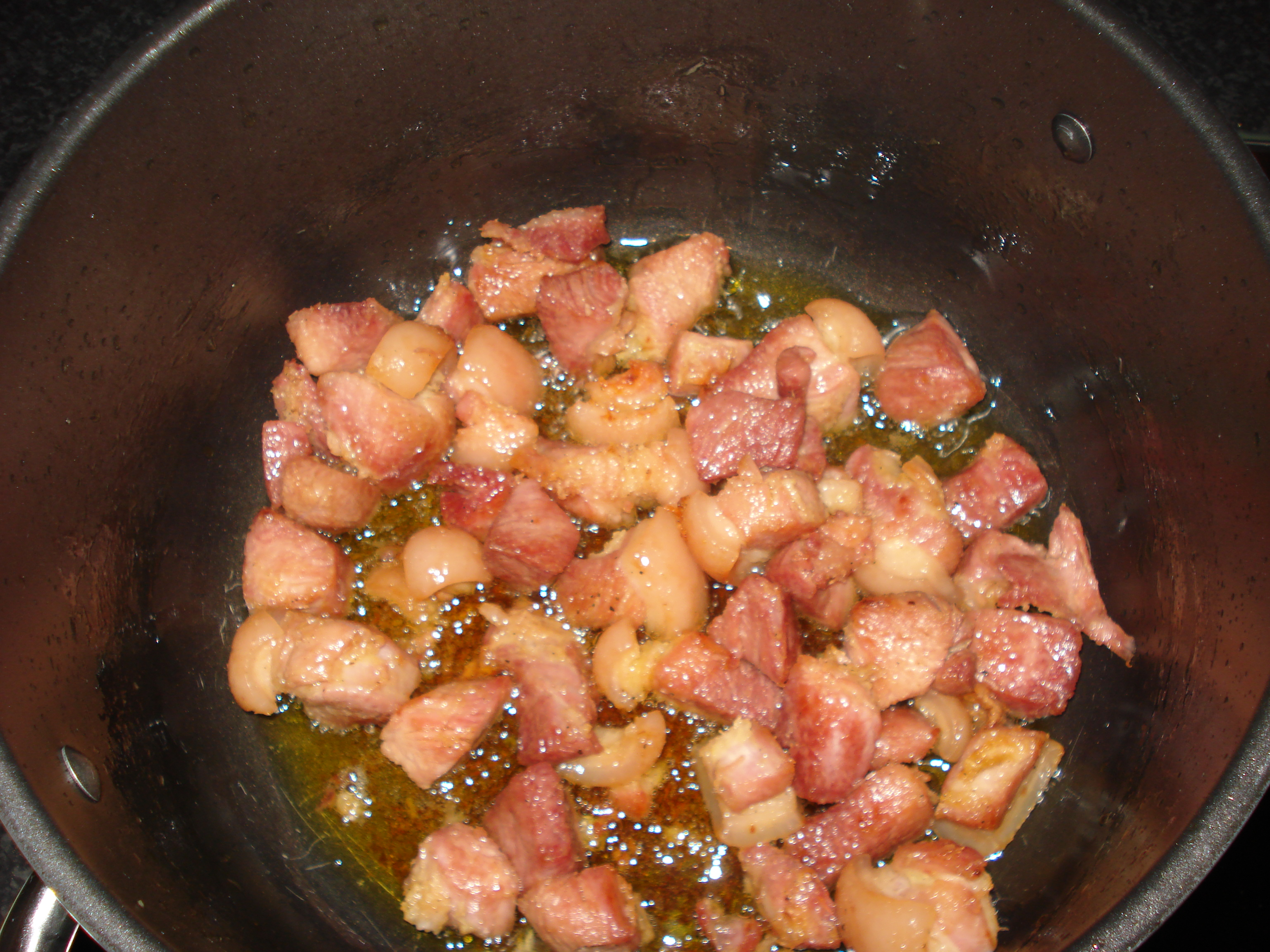
Tiganiá

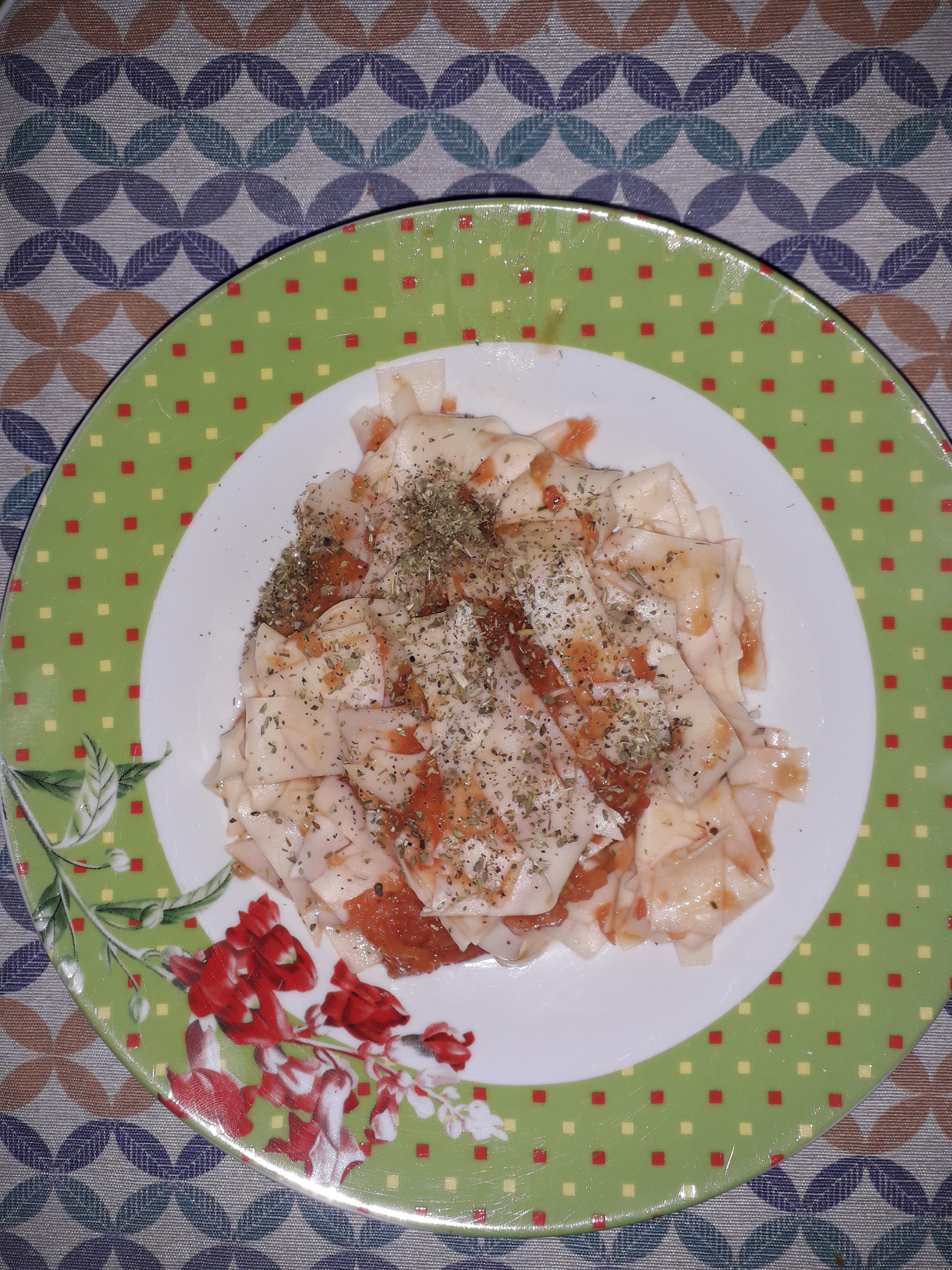
Petoura with tomato sauce

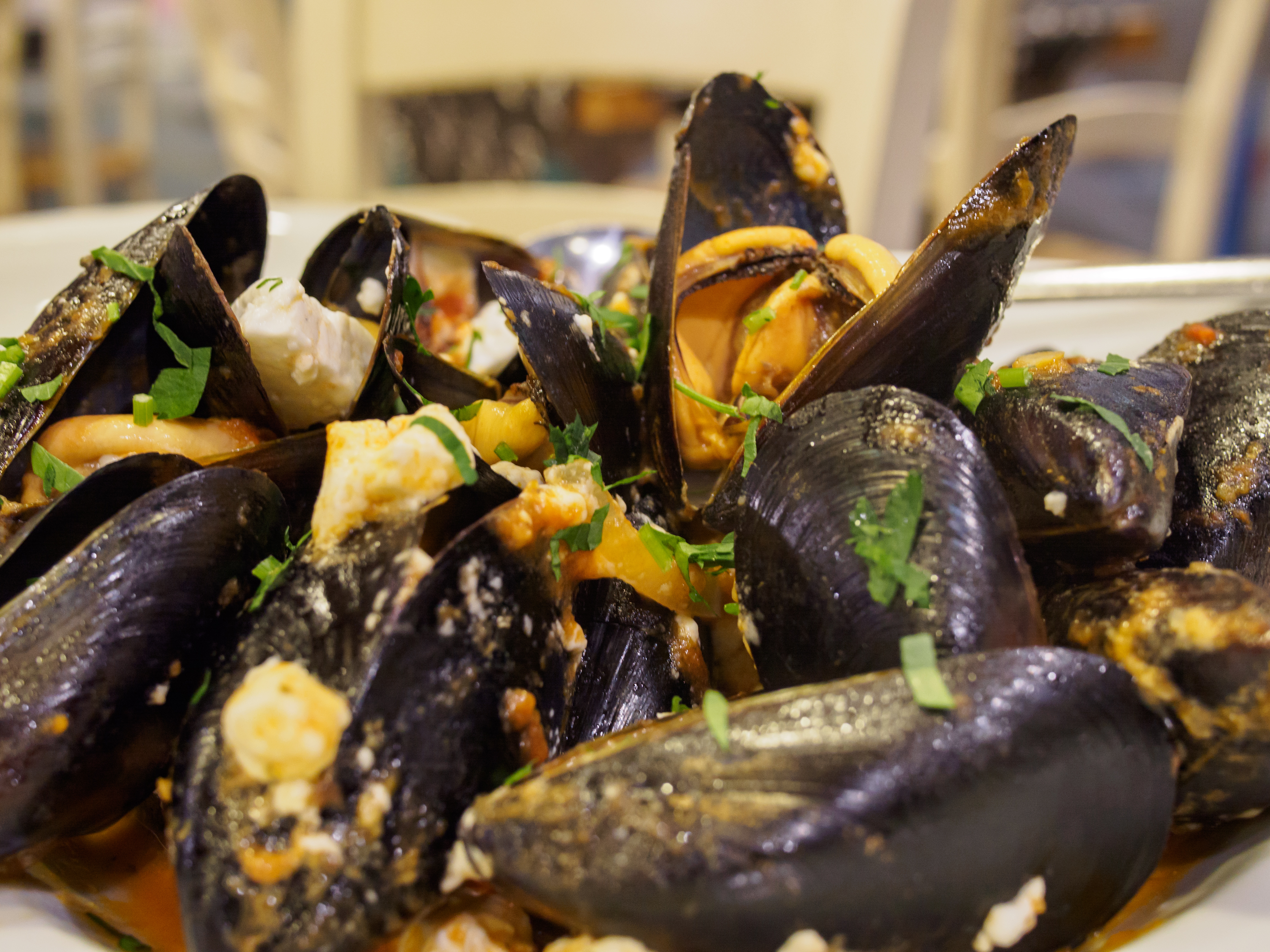
Mussels

Selected main courses:

- Arni me kydonia, lamb meat with quinces
- Arni me spanachi, lamb with spinach from Kavala
- Arni Κapamas, lamb with kapamas cooking technique
- Agriogourouno, wild boar meat.
- Beef stew, from Chalkidiki
- Bourani or Borani, from Pieria
- Buffalo in the gastra, from Serres
- Beef cheeks with pappardelle, from Imathia
- Bakaliaros, cod fish, the most well-known recipe is the fried bakaliaros mainly served with skordalia dip and fried potatoes. There is also Bakaliaros plaki.
- Bakaliaros with wild greens,
- Couscous, with beans and vegetables, from Thessaloniki
- Tarhana with sausage and hapsopilavon (pontian pilaf with gavros fish), from Kilkis
- Euriste, recipe with chylopítes (type of pasta) from Pontic Greek cuisine
- Fasoulotavas, recipe with baked giant dried beans called gigantes, a version is gigantes plaki
- Grivadi (kyprinos) with spinach,
- İmam bayıldı,
- Hünkar Beğendi (Sultan's Delight),
- Kokkinisto chicken, tomato chicken stew.
- Lake fish such as pestrofa and grivadi (kyprinos).
- Lamb with wild greens, from Chalkidiki
- Leeks and rice with sour plums,
- Lentils with bulgur,
- Lamb with chickpeas, from Pieria
- Louvidia with plivrimes, Greek Green Beans (Fasolakia) with pork pancetta
- Mantza, vegetables
- Manti, from Pella
- Makálo, meatballs with garlic sauce from Kastoria.
- Makaronia with eggplant sauce,
- Makedonian Tsomplek,
- Manitarosoupa, mushrooms soup
- Melintzanofa,
- Misoúra, meat plate.
- Mussels with saffron,
- Ospriada Makedoniki, a mix of legumes
- Petoura (petila), a type of hilopites
- Sardines with cabbage from Pieria,
- Pontic Magiritsa,
- Siron with paskitan and garlic, from Kilkis
- Soupies krasates, cuttlefishes in wine
- Tas kebab,
- Thracian Karvavitsa, from Pieria
- Tigania, fried pork.
- Trahanas, may be soup.
- Tsigerosarmades,
- Trahanas with sausage and hapsopilavon (pontian pilaf with gavros fish), from Kilkis
- Yaprákia, Christmas food in the region of Kozani, meat and rice in pickled cabbage-leaf (a variation of sarma)
- Buffalo shank with sauerkraut, a Christmas dish.
- Loukaniko (sausage), there are various types of loukaniko, with the well-known Tzoumagias sausage from Irakleia and Karamanli sausage, brought by Karamanlides refugees from Asia Minor.

== Desserts ==
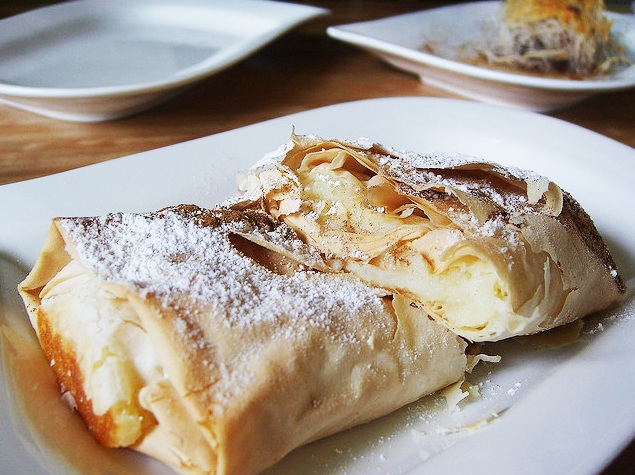
Sliced bougatsa

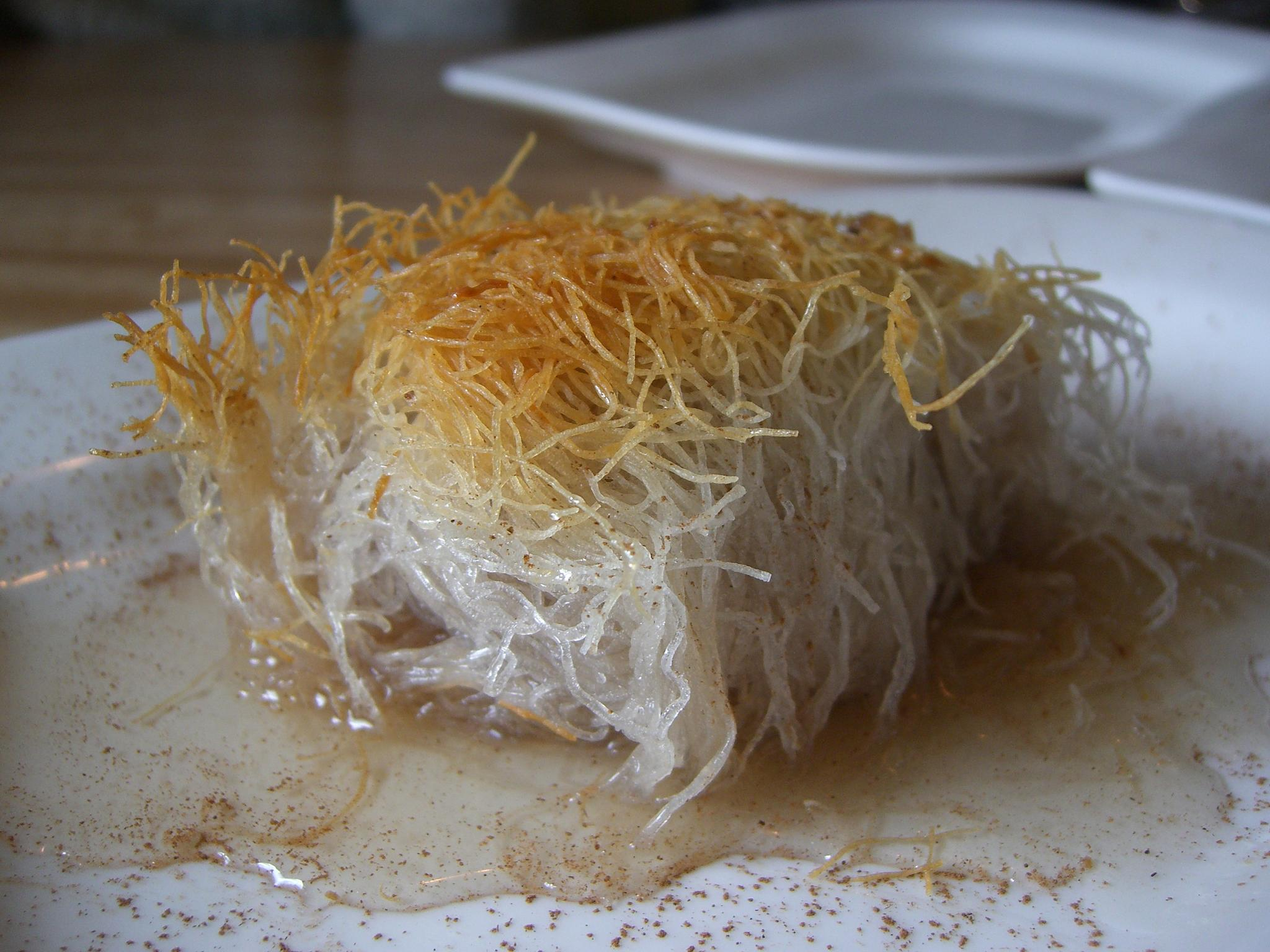
Kantaifi

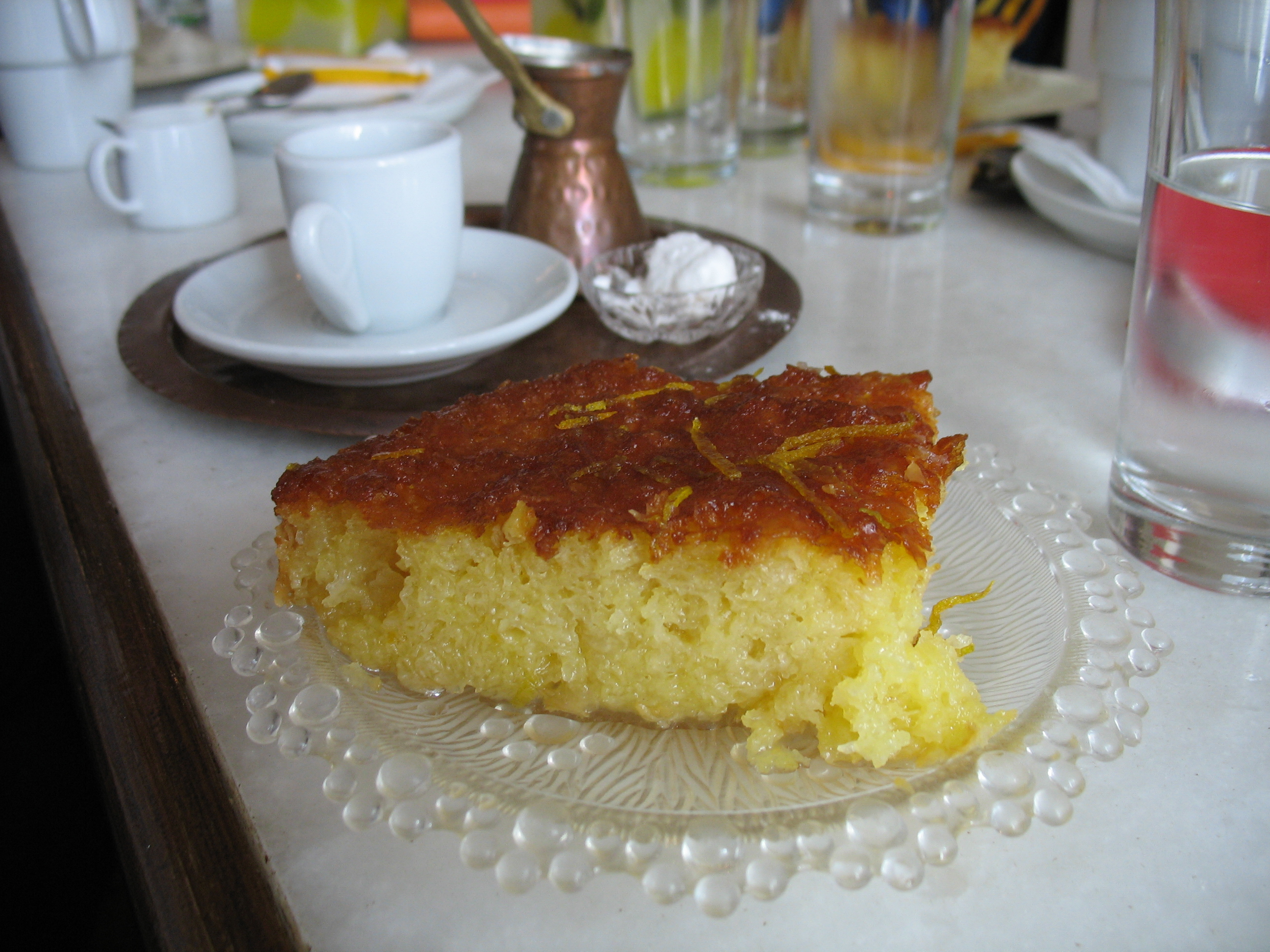
Revani

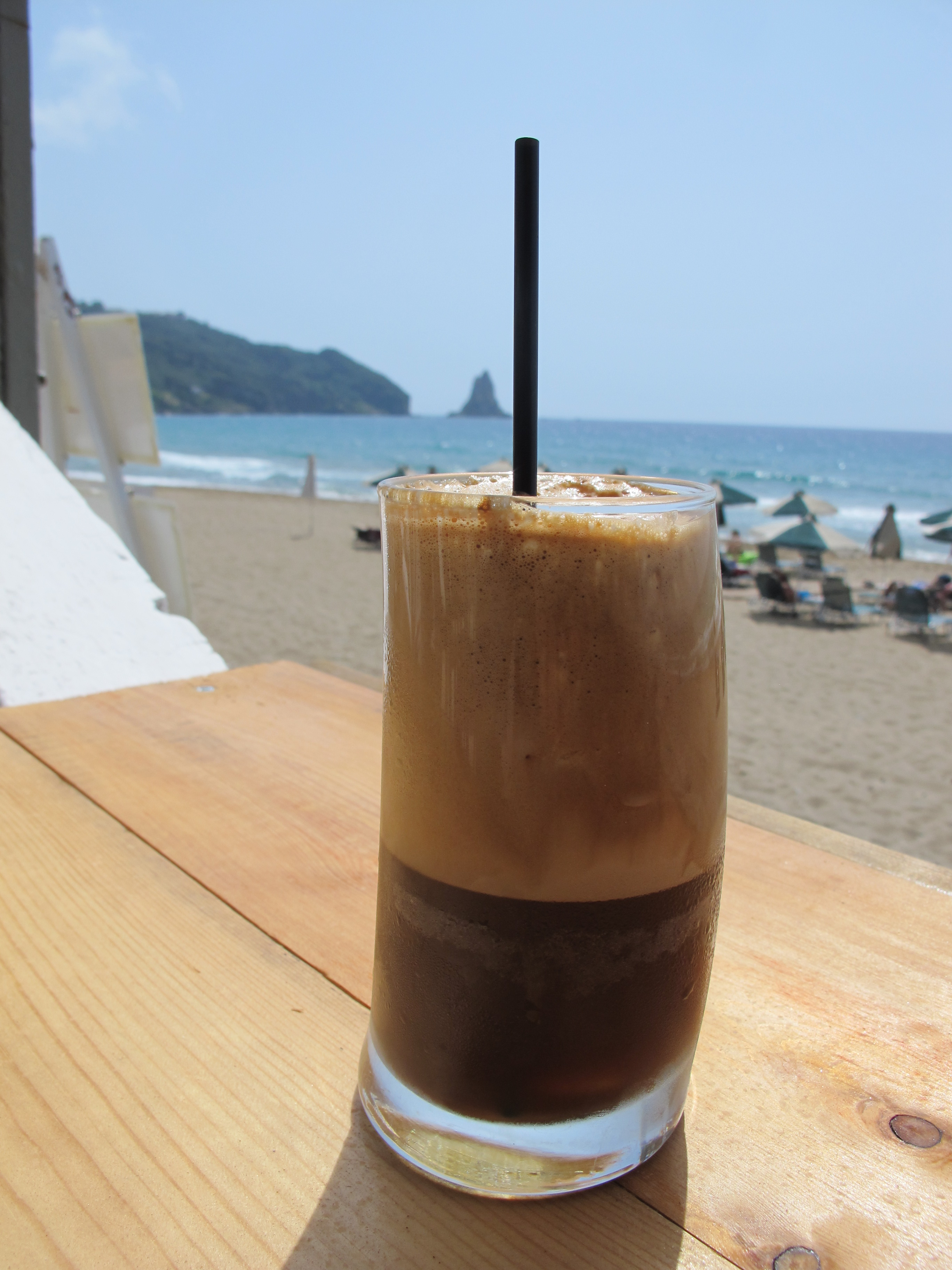
Frappé coffee

Selected desserts:

- Akanés, from Serres
- Armenovíl / Armenonville, from Thessaloniki
- Ashure
- Galatopita, milk pie with the well known the Sarakatsaniki galatopita from Pieria
- Crêpe,
- Komposta, from peach or other local fruits
- Halvas with semolina,
- Halvas sapoune, also known as jelly halvas
- Karydopita
- Kariokes, small sized walnut-filled chocolates and shaped like crescents
- Knafeh (kadayıf) from Constantinople,
- Kiounefe,
- Kazan Dibi,
- Kourkoubinia
- Kourampiedes
- Kydonopasto (quince paste), a traditional Greek dessert made with quince paste cut into cubes and rolled into sugar or ground nuts.
- Laggites, or Tiganites
- Moustopita,
- Mpezedes (Mareges)
- Pandespani
- Pastafrola
- Pasteli, honey sesame bar
- Poniró, from Serres
- Roxákia,
- Revani, from Veria
- Sáliaroi (Saliaria), from Kozani
- Samali, extra syrupy Greek semolina cake with mastic
- Şekerpare
- Spoon sweets,
- Trigona Panoramatos Thessalonikis,
- Tsoureki
- Tulumba, syrupy dessert.
- Candied fruits, known as fruit glace with the well-known the marron glace. Candied fruits can be found in Greece in specialty candy shops selling along with other related products exclusively, such as dried fruits, nuts, jellies, koufeta, loukoumia, chocolate bars, sokolatakia (bonbon), pralines, spoon sweets, pasteli, halva, fudge, petit four, granola, granola bars, sweet spreads, breakfast cereals, energy bar, and others.

== Drinks ==
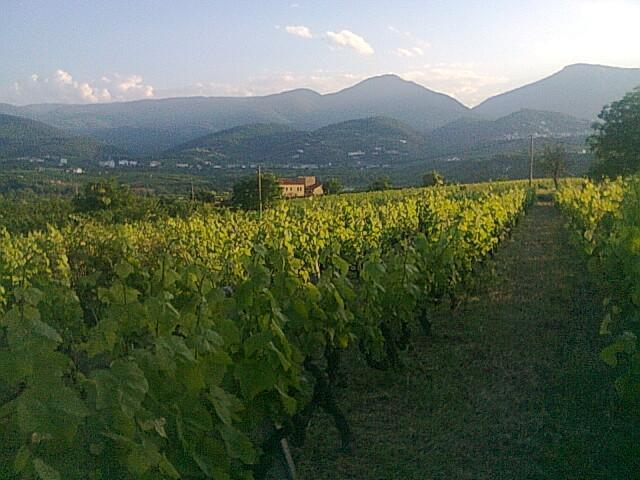
A vineyard in Naoussa

Selected beverages and drinks:

- Frappé coffee, invented in Thessaloniki in 1957.
- Greek coffee,
- Wine,
- Greek mountain tea,
- Xino Nero, from Florina
- Mineral water, from several recognized water sources from Greece.
- Sparkling mineral water, mineral carbonated water from sources from Greece.

== See also ==
- Greek wine
- Greek cuisine
- Greek restaurant
- Ottoman cuisine
- Byzantine cuisine
- List of Greek dishes
- Cuisine of the Mediterranean
- List of Michelin-starred restaurants in Greece
