= Syron =

Syron may refer to:

== People ==
- Siro the Epicurean (fl. c. 50 BC), also known as Syron, Epicurean philosopher
- Brian Syron (1934–1993), actor, teacher, Aboriginal rights activist, stage director and Australia's first Aboriginal feature film director
- Richard F. Syron, American business executive, former chairman and CEO of both the Federal Home Loan Mortgage Corporation and former CEO of the New York Stock Exchange
- Daisy Syron Russell, English singer known as Syron

== See also ==
- Siron (food), a pasta dish
- Gessiron Alves de Franco (born 1947), known as Siron Franco, Brazilian painter and sculptor
- Siren (disambiguation)
