= Kuymak =

Dish of cornmeal and cheese

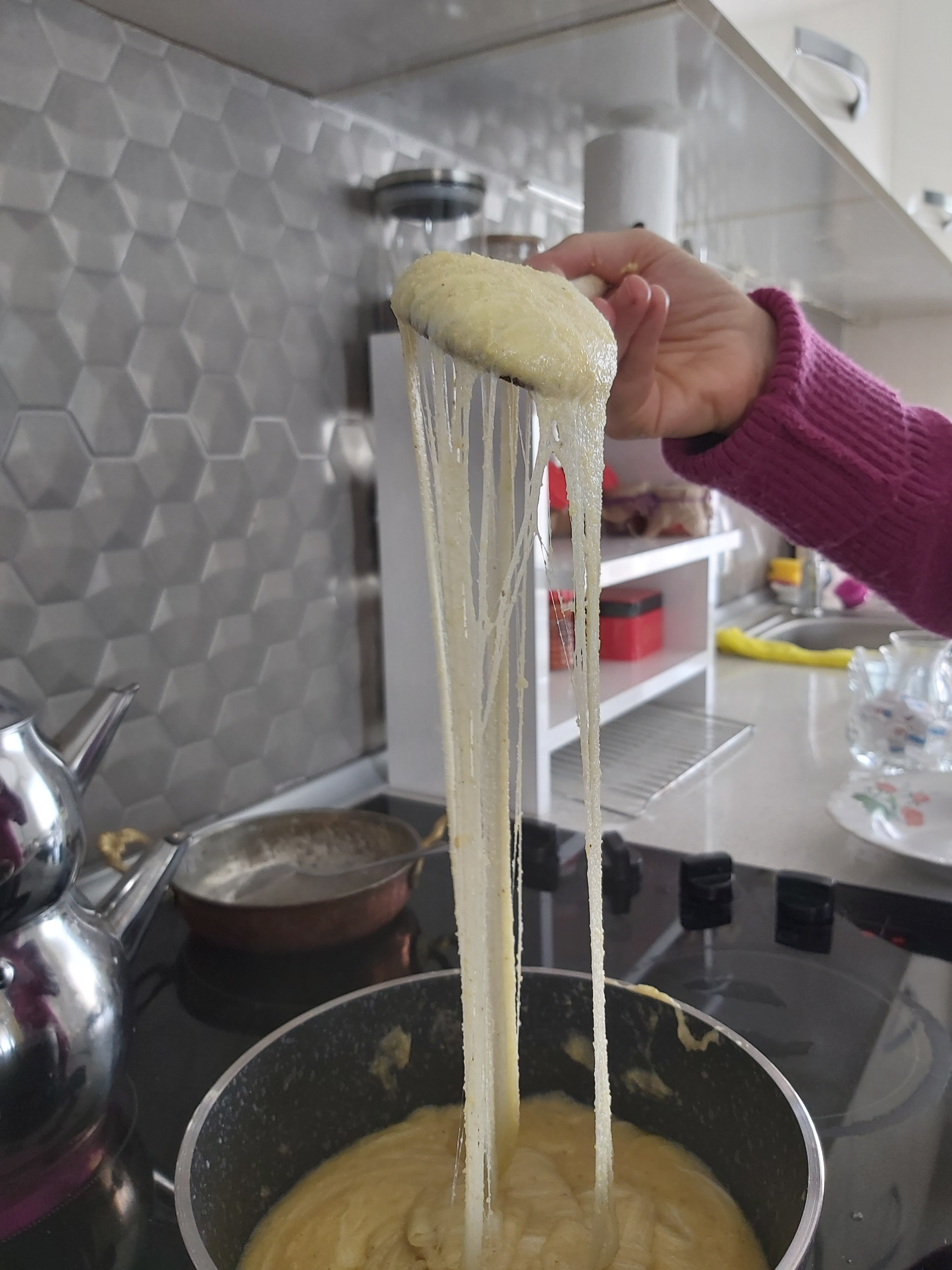
- Kuymak dished out on a spoon
- Type: Cheese dish
- Place of origin: Pontus region
- Region or state: Black Sea region
- Main ingredients: Minci or golot cheese; cornmeal or wheat flour; cream or butter; water

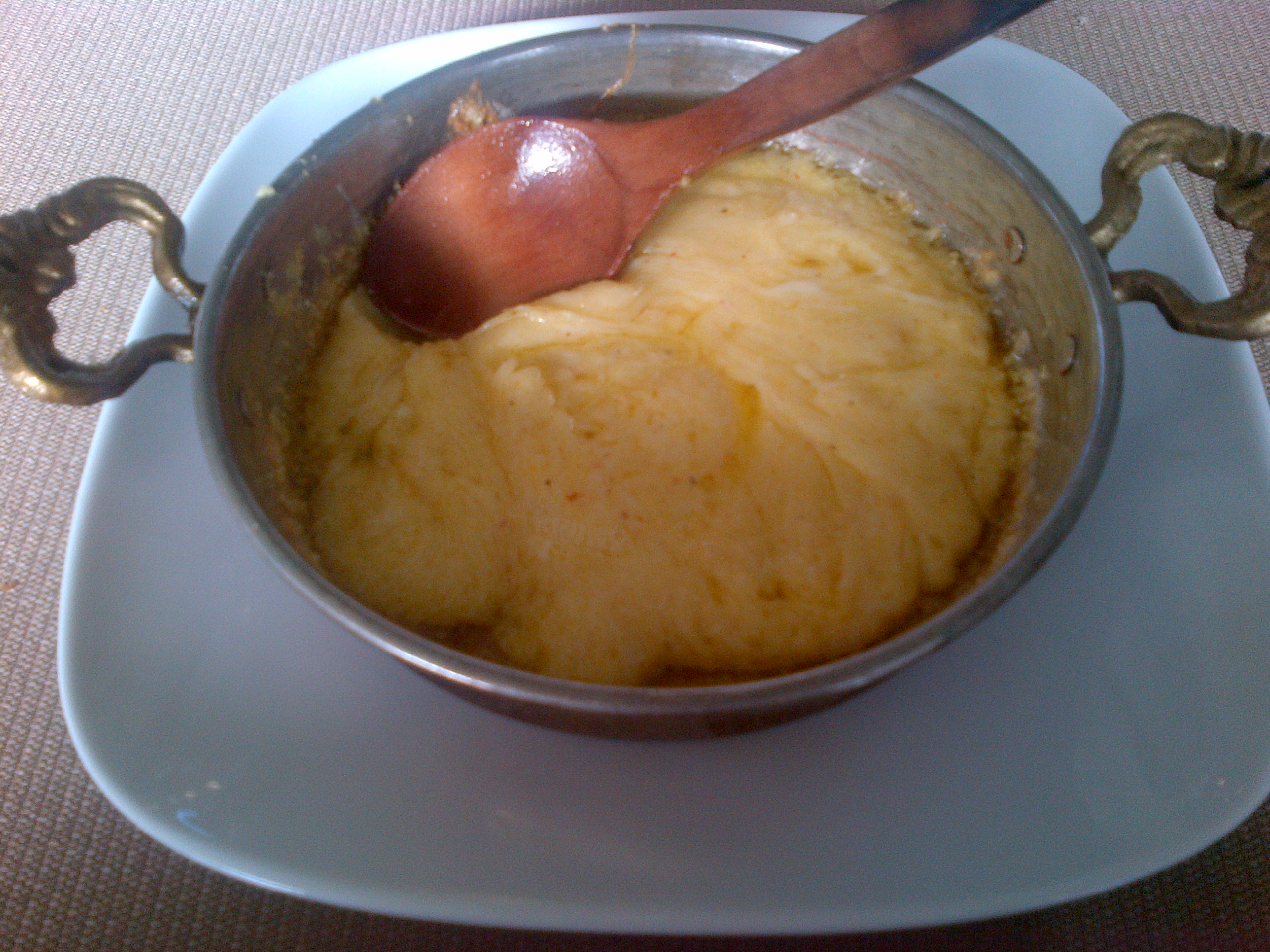
Kuymak in a sahan

Kuymak or khavitz (Greek: χαβίτς) is a dish from the Pontus region that now lies in northern Turkey, and is popular in areas around the Black Sea. Its primary ingredients are cornmeal and cheese. It is typically served with bread and a spoon.

== Variations ==
The Pontic Greeks, who have lived in the region of Pontus since roughly 800 BCE, make a dish similar to kuymak; theirs is called Χαβίτς, which can be Romanized as chavítz, havítz or khavítz. Chavítz, like kuymak, is made with butter, cornmeal, cheese, water or milk, and salt. It might also include yogurt, honey, or bacon. Cooked cornmeal sometimes goes by the same name.

== See also ==
- Pontic Greek cuisine
- List of maize dishes
