= Macedonian cuisine (disambiguation) =

Macedonian cuisine is the cuisine originating in the country of North Macedonia

Macedonian cuisine may also refer to:

- Greek Macedonian cuisine, the cuisine originating in the Greek region of Macedonia
- Ancient Macedonian cuisine, the cuisine of the Ancient Greek kingdom of Macedonia
