= Pontic Greek cuisine =

Pontic Greek cuisine consists of foods traditionally eaten by Pontic Greeks (Pontic: Ρωμαίοι, Ρωμιοί), a Greek-speaking ethnic minority that originates from the southern shore of the Black Sea in modern Turkey. Their cuisine has been heavily influenced by the migration of different ethnic groups to the Pontos. Because of the Pontos' remote location, Pontic Greek cuisine has many differences from other Greek cuisines. According to Achillefs Keramaris et al., "Pontic Greek traditional cuisine is diverse and simplistic, incorporating traditions from mountainous and coastal regions, ancient Greece, nomadic regions, and influences from Russian, Turkish, Laz, Hemshin, and Armenian cuisines."

== Ingredients and cooking implements ==
Traditionally, Pontians have employed agriculture and foraging. A study of different ethnic groups living in Hankavan, Armenia found that Pontic Greeks in that region gathered 31 different plant species. Seafood, vegetables, dairy products, and grains are integral to Pontic Greek cuisine. Milk, cheese, buttermilk, and yogurt are the important dairy products. Pontians were traditionally farmers who produced their own food. They ate whatever was available.

The Pontos region has a distinct winter and summer; Pontians traditionally prepared food for winter by drying fruit and pickling vegetables. Other staples of the winter diet include salted fish, cheese, and pre-cooked pasta.

Cookware was made of brass, copper, or iron. Traditional cooking implements include the satz, a convex metal pan used for cooking flatbreads over open fire. Tapsin is the name for a traditional Pontian baking tray. These are circular in shape, somewhat like a cake tin. A colander or strainer is called a sirkets. A pot was called an otzak, tzak, or tenzari. A pan with handles was called a tava. A shallow pot was called a helvani. Ladles, called kutal, were also used.

For liquids, Pontians also used the koukoum, a metal water jug; the parchats (pail) for storing water or milk; and the tsagianiko, or teapot.

Pontians served food in deep copper plates; the word for this dish is shahan. Families in rural Pontos ate around low wooden tables.

== Food products ==
=== Meat and seafood products ===
Before refrigeration technology was invented, Pontians cured and preserved meat and seafood to make it last. While they also ate fresh poultry, beef, pork, and seafood, there were some distinct cured meats. Pontian sausage was called soutzouki. Beef cured in its own fat was called savourmas. Cured meat that was heavily seasoned was called pastourmas. Anchovies were only abundant at a certain time of year; at other times, Pontians living along the coast ate salt-cured anchovies, pasta chapsia.

=== Dairy products ===
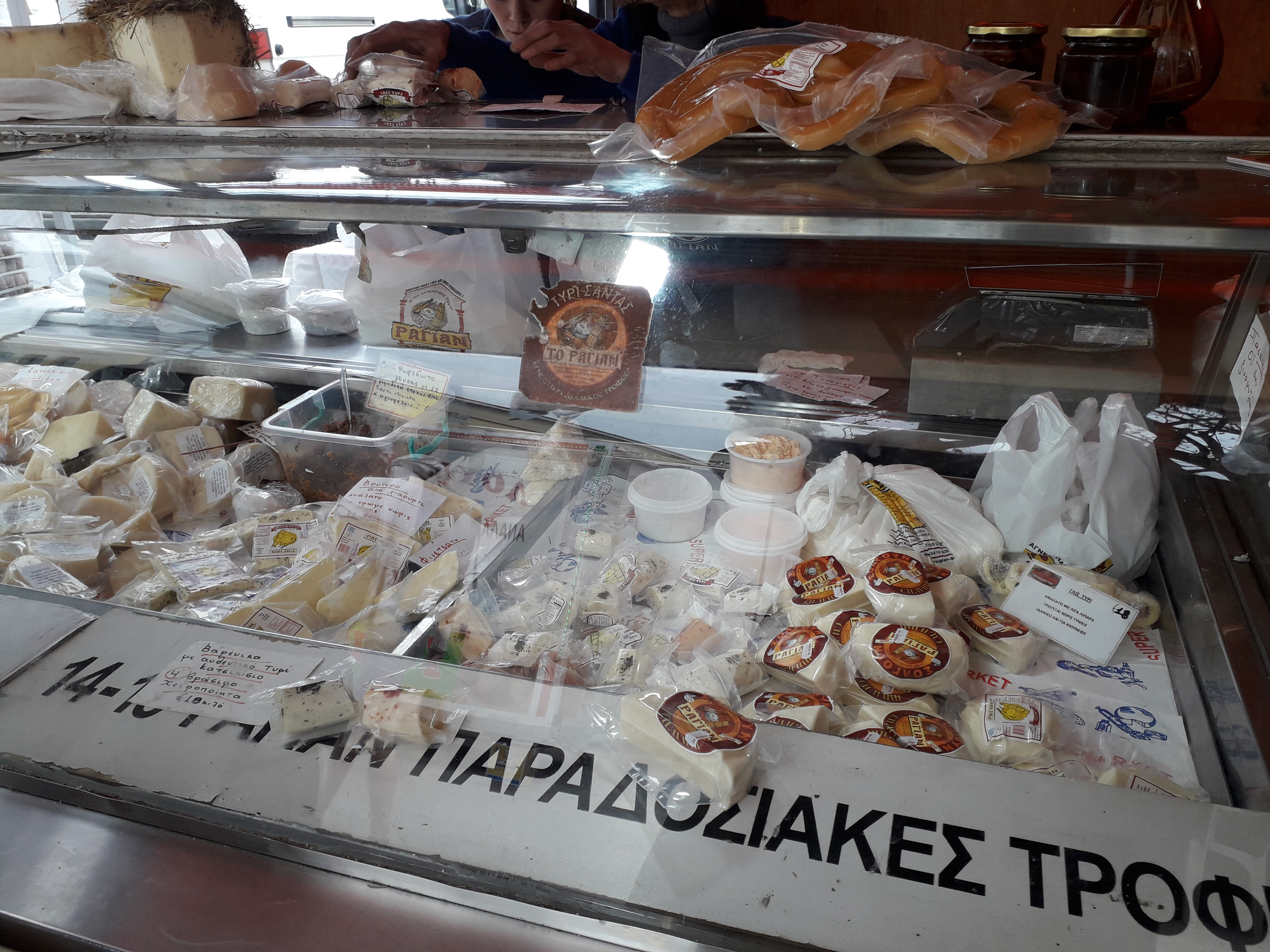
Food stall displaying a variety of Pontic Greek cheeses including gais and goat cheeses

Dairy was an important part of the Pontian diet. Milk was preserved in the form of yogurt and cheese. Pontians often cooked with butter. Other dairy products were key ingredients in foods such as tan, soups, and chavitz.

Yogurt was one Pontian dairy product. The word for strained yogurt is yliston, while skimmed yogurt is paskitan. Pontians also made many different cheeses, including tsokalik, a soft cheese tsortan, a hard cheese; koloth, a "cheese like gruyere;" and mintzin, type of whey cheese.

== Dishes ==
=== Breakfast ===
Pontian breakfast foods typically involved bread or eggs. One egg dish is foustoron, a meal of fried eggs similar to an omelette. Depending on the region, the foustoron would be prepared with different ingredients. For example, Pontians in coastal Sourmena ate chapsofoustoron, an omelette with anchovies. In the region around Ordu, they ate melofoustoron, a honey omelette. Around Argyropolis, they ate pumpkin omelettes. Omelettes with potatoes were made around the Sanda area. A legume omelette, called fasoulotiganon, was also eaten.

They also made felia (φελία), Pontian French toast. The finished felia were sprinkled with honey or sugar. Pontians also made lalánggia, (Λαλάγγια), a type of fried dough similar to pancakes. They were made with yeast, flour, melted butter, lemon zest, milk, and sometimes raisins.

=== Porridge ===
Pontians also traditionally ate many varieties of porridge. The base might be flour, cornmeal, or barley flour; they typically also involved dairy.

Havitz or chavitz, (pnt) (Χαβίτς), a thick porridge made with cornmeal, butter, and cheese, was one popular Pontian porridge. It's similar to the Turkish dish kuymak. Cornmeal was pre-baked in the oven prior to being boiled for porridge. Many varieties exist; it might be made with strained yogurt (paskitan) or shredded kasseri. Havitz could be sprinkled with honey or sugar to sweeten it. The word havitz could also refer to boiled cornmeal. Tyroklosti is a similar dish, also made with butter, cheese, and corn flour.

Sourva, made with wheat or barley, is another type of porridge. Pousintia is prepared with barley flour and either honey, molasses, or milk. Hasil refers to a thin flour porridge poured over milk, honey, butter, sugar, or fruit broth. Paskitanofei is made with flour, paskitan, tan, and onion. Papara is a sort of bread porridge: it is prepared with pieces of stale bread cooked in milk or yogurt. Another kind is kologkythomalezon, pumpkin porridge.

=== Soups ===
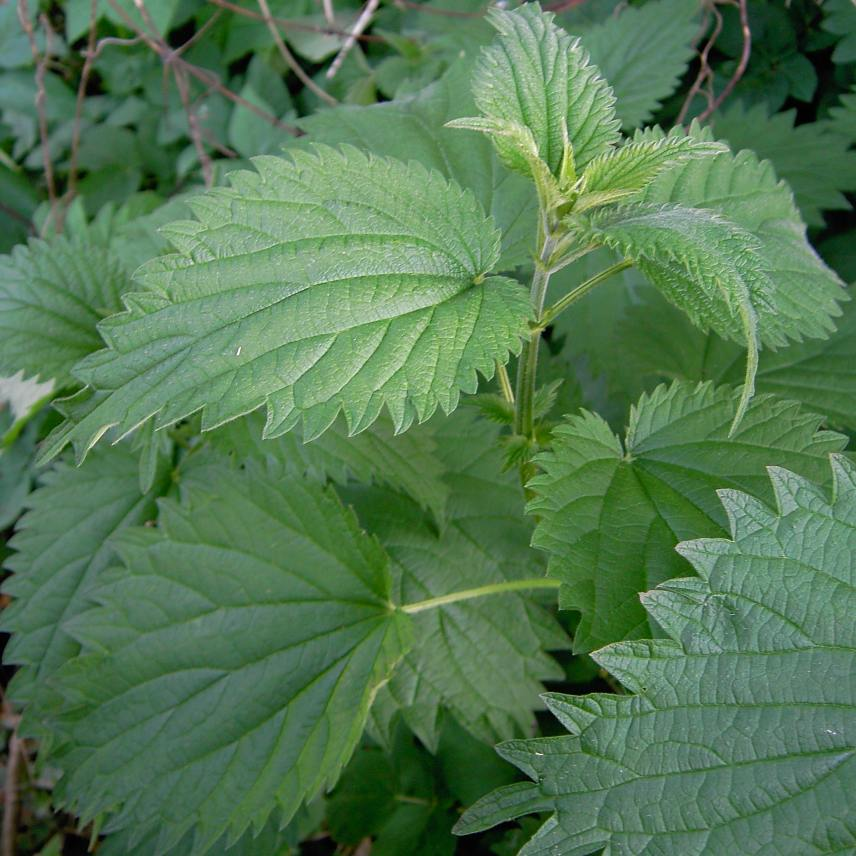
Urtica dioica, stinging nettles

Soup was very popular in the Pontos. Soups were often made with grains and vegetables; their ingredients varied according to season. One dish was kinteata (κιντέατα), a type of nettle soup shared with Iranian cuisine. This soup, prepared with stinging nettles (Pontic: κιντέα), might also have other vegetables and grains. It was typically flavored with garlic and hot peppers. Another soup, popular in winter, was mavra laxana, made with cabbage, beans, and sometimes jalapeños, based on the cook's preferences. Maposourv was the name of a soup made with the white parts of cabbage. Bean soups were referred to by the catch-all name fasoulosirv. Malez, a sort of grain soup, was made with flour. Pontians also had their own variety of borscht, which they called portz.

Some soups had a yogurt base. Tanoménon sorvá or tanofái (τανωμένον σορβά, τανοφάι) was made with onions, mint, and yogurt. It's similar to the Turkish soup yayla çorbası. Another, paskitanomalezon, was made with paskitan (skimmed yogurt).

=== Rice ===
Rice was a staple grain in Pontos and the base for many pilav dishes. Chicken or vegetable broth was a common base. The ingredients in Pontian pilav vary based on region, season, and food availability. Seasonings could vary from cook to cook.

Mythopilavon was a type of pilav made with mussels as the main protein. Herbs, such as dill, were cooked into the pilav to give it flavor. This kind of recipe would have been more popular along the Black Sea coast, where people could fish, as opposed to further inland Another coastal variety was hapsipilavon, anchovy pilav. This was common in winter and spring when fresh anchovies were abundant, although Pontians ate salted anchovies year-round. Raisins, parsley, and chopped pine nuts were typical seasonings. This dish is shared with Laz people.

One variety that owes its name to the ancient coastal town of Sinope is Sinope pilav, a variety with chicken, fresh vegetables, and chopped nuts.

Another variety, vrasti, was made with wild greens. Pontians were avid foragers, and they traditionally foraged many greens in addition to growing their own vegetables.

=== Pasta ===
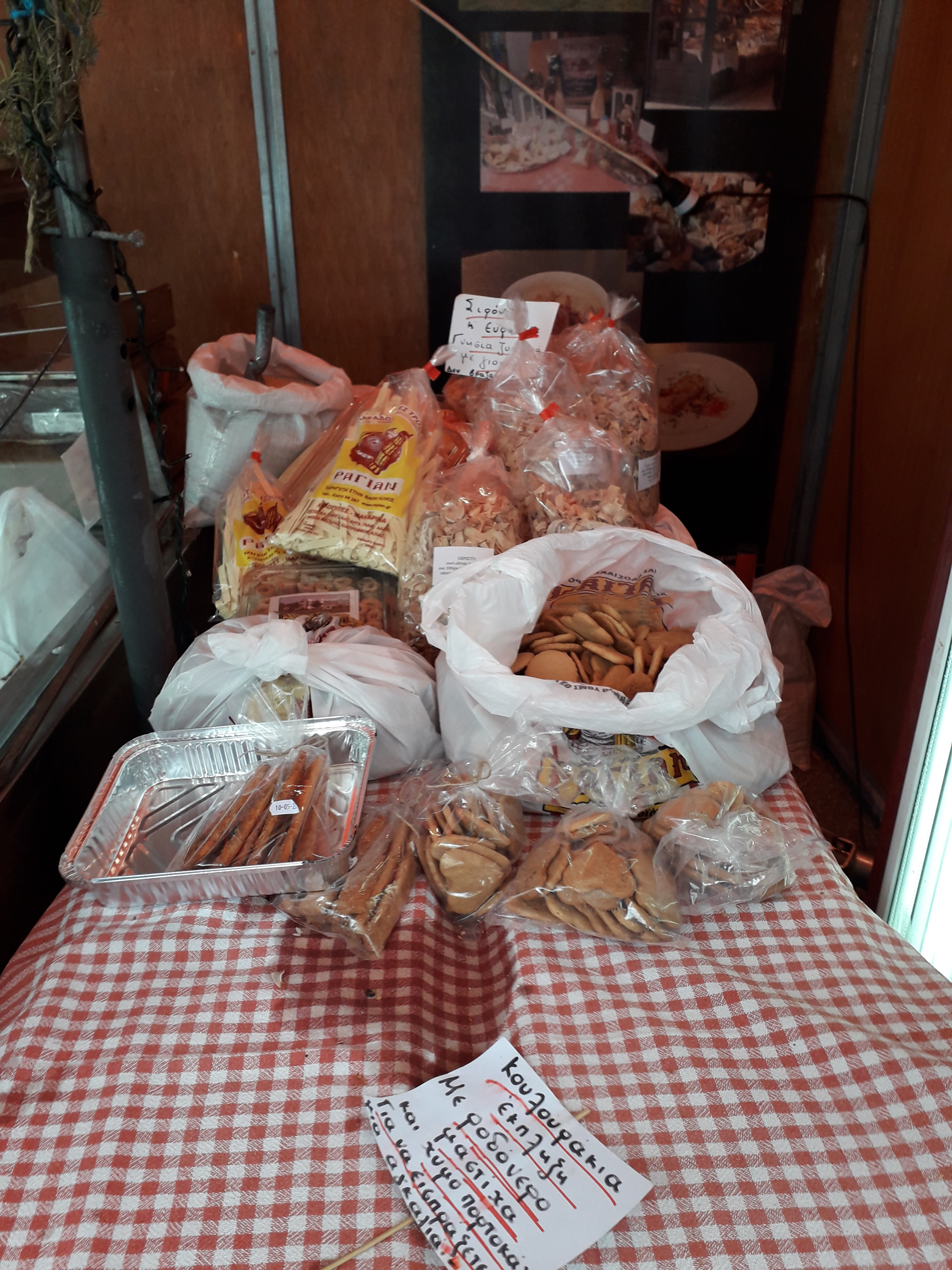
Koulourakia and traditional Pontic noodles for sale at a food stall in Athens

Pontians also had some pasta dishes. Pasta was generally made fresh. One variety was makarina, dried pasta. Another is siron (pnt) (σιρόν), shared with Turkish cuisine. Pontian cooks would place fresh-baked phyllo dough in a pot and pour boiling water or stock over them. As the siron soaked up liquid, toppings such as paskitan (strained yogurt) and garlic would be poured on the dish. The result was a sort of porridge very different from Italian pasta.

=== Breads ===
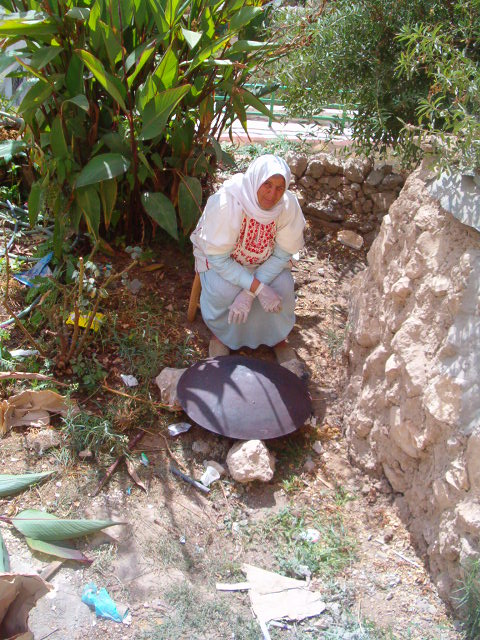
Palestinian woman with satz, West Bank

Bread and other wheat products were important parts of the Pontian diet. Pontians made both flatbreads and yeast-risen breads. One such flatbread is satz bread, bread cooked on a satz. Satz is the Romeika word for a convex iron griddle used exclusively to cook flatbreads. The bread would be kneaded, shaped into a thin circle, and fried on the satz directly over an open fire. It would then be served with a variety of sides. Pontians also made pita and lavashia (Λαβάσια), a bread similar to Armenian lavash and likely borrowed from Armenian cuisine.

Pontians also made pishía (pnt) (πιςία), a type of savory fried dough from Turkic cuisine. Pishía was risen, unlike many other Pontian breads, and served with honey. Another Pontian bread was psathyria, which was very buttery.

Many bread dishes had fillings or were made into pies. Pontians made perek (Περέκ), similar to Turkish börek and Greek tiropita. Fresh phyllo dough would be dipped in a mix of eggs, salt, milk, and oil, then covered with a cheese filling. Another layer of dipped phyllo dough would be added and the process repeated until there was a sufficient layered pie. The pie would then be baked in the oven. A simpler variation on berek is bereketi, a single sheet of cooked lavashia filled with tsokalik cheese. The lavashia would be folded in half and fried again, then served with dipping sauces. Bereketi, unlike berek, can be made on the satz.

Another pie was diamesia, made with vegetable filling.

=== Meat and seafood ===
Pontian meats included chicken, beef, and pork. Meat had a versatile role in stews, soups, stocks, pies, dumplings, and other dishes when it was available. For example, Pontians made their own variety of kibbeh, which was served with rice. Pontians also traditionally made kebabs, usually with pork. Although Pontians also made dolmades without meat, the ones that included meat were called lachanontolmades. Pontians also had their own variety of meatballs, called kioftedes. Pontians also used chicken broth or stock to make pilav and other dishes.

Pontian refugees also brought peynirli, a Turkish pie dish that could include meat, vegetables, and cheese, to Greece during the population exchange.

Salads could include meat as well. One Pontian salad recipe calls for lettuce, chicken, prunes, walnuts, and sour cream.

They also made dolmades or sarmades, a stuffed leaf dish; the leaves could be grape leaves or cabbage. The filling might be vegetarian or contain meat. The filling could contain mincemeat, rice, grated onions, salt, pepper, and parsley. The dolmades would be boiled in water and served with a yogurt-based sauce.

Anchovies were abundant in the Pontian diet. They could be made into pilav, as noted above, or cooked with vegetables to make chapsoplakin. Mussels could also be used for pilav.

=== Dumplings ===
Pontians cooked many different types of dumplings and pies. Some have already been mentioned above; for example, peynirli could be seen as a type of pie. Others are mentioned in this section.

One dumpling is called varénika (βαρένικα). The dough is made from flour, water, salt, and an egg. The dough is rolled out and cut into small, circular leaves. Each leaf is stuffed with a cheese-based filling and then pinched shut. The dumplings are then boiled. Varénika are served with melted butter and caramelized onions; alternatively, they can be served with tomato or pesto sauce. Herbs such as paprika and mint are often added. They might also be garnished with pine nuts, walnuts, or sesame seeds.

Mantía (Μαντία) are another kind of dumpling. These are wrinkly dumplings with a mincemeat filling. Although the dough is the same as for the varenika, mantía are larger. Mantía are also served with tsatsoupel, a kind of salsa. Pliménika are another kind of Pontian dumpling, around the same size as varénika.

Chebureki, a kind of deep fried dumplings, is also usual in this cuisine.

Peréskia is another dish. To prepare it, one forms a long roll of dough, stuffs it with an herbed potato-cheese filling, and then wraps it into a tight spiral. The spiral is deep-fried in hot oil.

=== Fruits ===
Fruits may be eaten fresh, dried or preserved (such as jam or jelly), as different fruits only grow during certain seasons.

Pontians traditionally make chosaf, a type of fruit compote shared with Turkish cuisine. Fruits can also be used to make broth. Grapes in particular are used to make wine and petimézi, grape syrup.

=== Vegetables ===
Pontians traditionally prepared many different vegetable dishes. For example, Pontians prepared stupa or stupa torshi, spicy pickled vegetables. They also made türlü, slow-cooked vegetables, and İmam bayıldın, stuffed eggplant; both are shared with Turkish cuisine. Pontians also made fried potatoes (similar to French fries) with onions and parsley. They were served with adjika, a condiment.

Some other vegetable dishes include galatogkolokython, or pumpkin cooked in milk. Pontians tried to use every bit of the food, including beet greens; the name for beet greens cooked with butter and garlic is porania.

=== Drinks ===
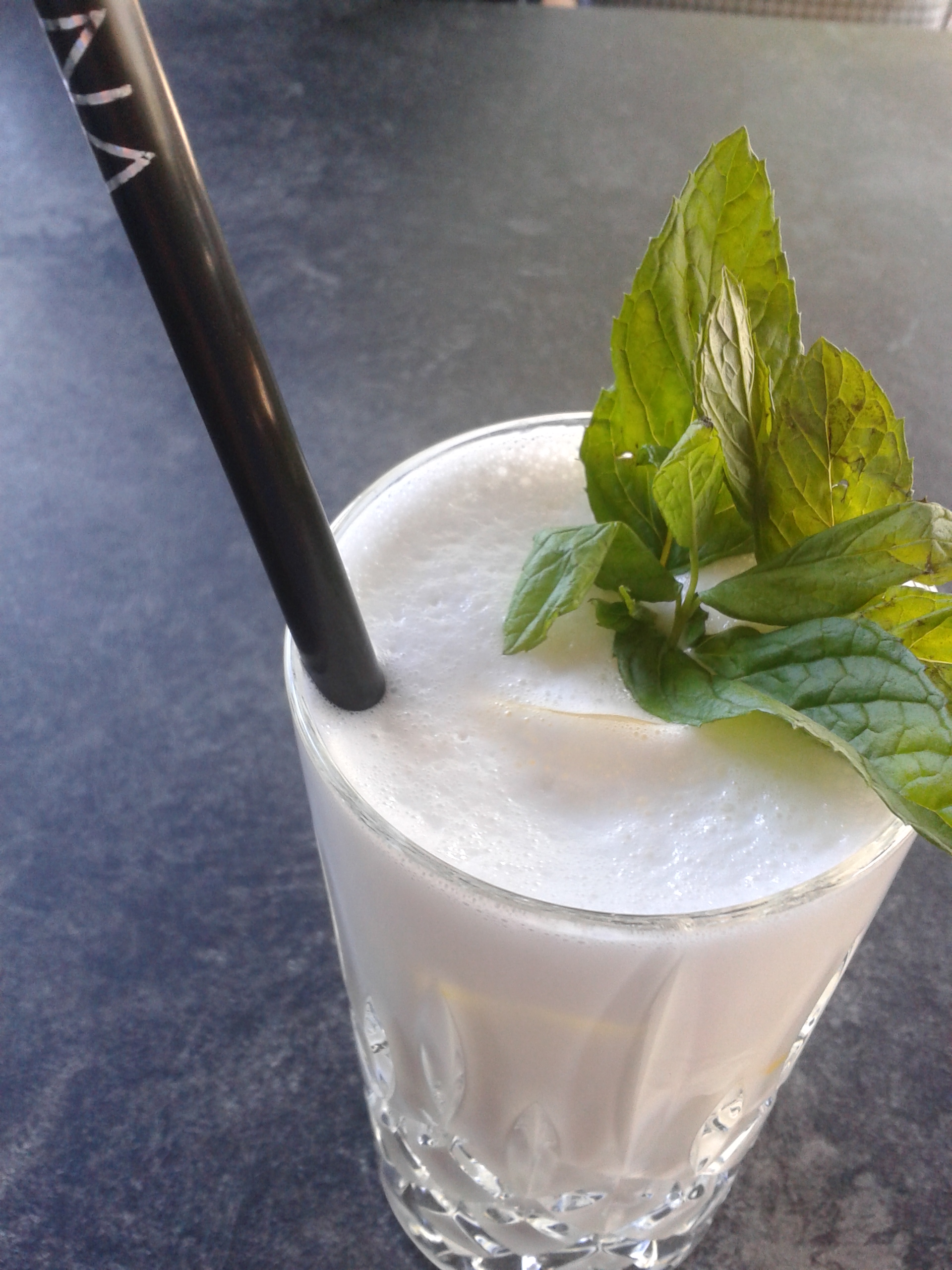
Tan with mint in Ankara

One Pontian drink was tan, a fermented dairy product, served cold. Pontians also drank tea and coffee. Pontians also drink salep, a beverage made from ground orchid tubers. Pontians specifically use the roots of the early purple orchid.

=== Condiments ===
Some Pontian condiments and sauces were yogurt-based. Paskitan could be the base of a sauce, for example. Tsatsoupel was another condiment, similar to salsa. Tsatsoupel was made from quince, tomatoes, chili peppers, bell peppers, and a variety of spices. Another condiment is adjika, borrowed from Georgian cuisine.

=== Desserts and sweets ===
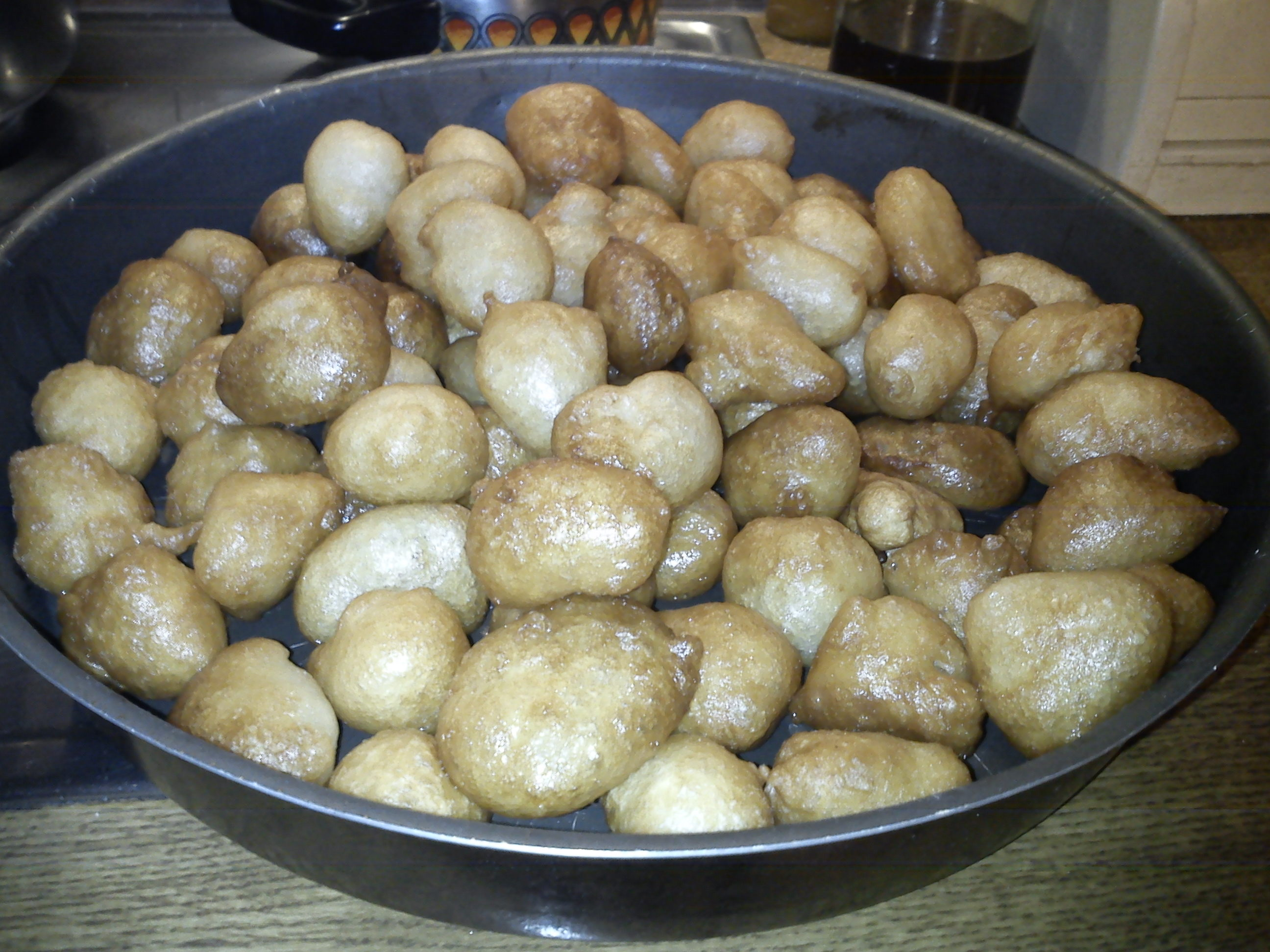
Tsirichtá

Pontians made many sweets, most of them wheat-based. Tsirichtá (pnt) (τσιριχτά) are one example. These are Pontian loukoumades: deep-fried, sweet dough drizzled with honey. Otía (pnt) (ωτία) were another variety of fried dessert.

Pontians also made chosaf, or fruit compote; tsorekin, sweet buns; and tsorek' pourma, a baklava variety from the Kars region.

Sousamópita (σουσαμόπιτα) is another dish. This dessert was made by filling dough with a mixture of tahini, sugar, cinnamon, sesame seeds, and breadcrumbs. The dumplings are then pinched shut and baked in the oven.

== Food for special occasions ==
=== Easter ===
On Easter, Pontians made paschaliná augá (Πασχαλινά Αυγά), which literally translates to "Easter eggs." These were eggs dyed red by boiling them with onion skins.

=== Funerals ===
Kollyva is a sweet dish made of boiled grains, nuts, raisins, and sugar. It is traditionally eaten at funerals and memorial services.
