= Golot cheese =

Turkish cheese from the Eastern Black Sea region

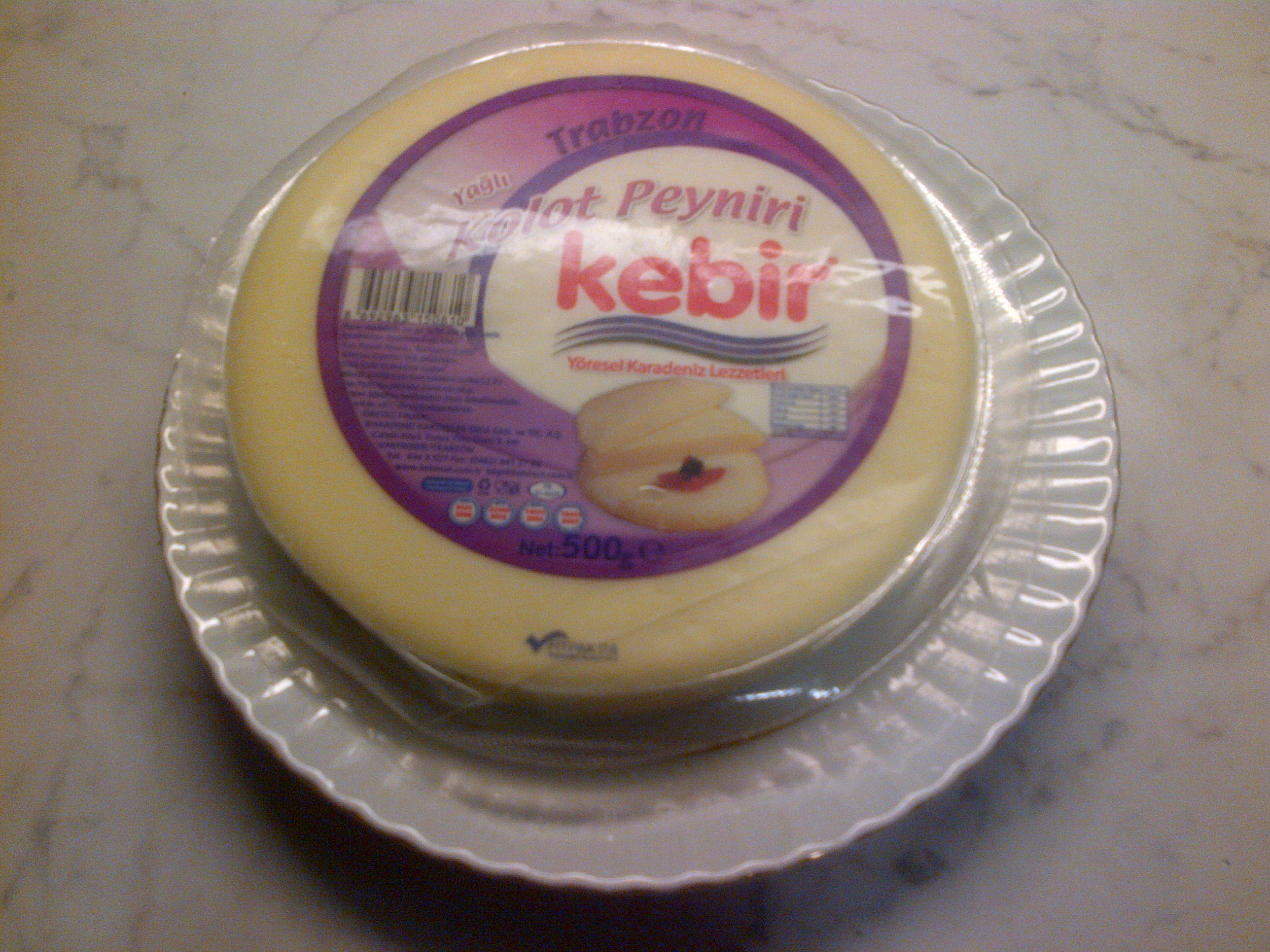
Golot cheese from Trabzon, Turkey

Golot or Kolot cheese is a variety of Turkish cheese that is traditionally produced in the region of Eastern Black Sea, Turkey.

== Production ==
The average composition of Golot cheese is 43.51% total solids, 5.31% fat, 33.64% protein, and 3.12% salt. The mixture of morning and night milk is heated to 37°C and separated from the fat. An appropriate amount of rennet and yogurt whey are added to the non-fat milk and then heated until the precipitation (65-70°C). The curd is then transferred into the cheesecloth for whey drainage about 15 hours. The cheeses are placed in a 50 kg (110 lb) polypropylene bags; granular cheeses are added between each Golot cheese and waited for one week. The Golot cheeses are pressed into wooden containers with cover and ripened between 6 months and 1 year based on the consumption period.
