= Precipitate (disambiguation) =

Precipitate or precipitates, or variant, may refer to:

- Precipitate, the product of chemical precipitation
- Precipitate, the product of meteorological precipitation
- Precipitate (EP), an EP released by Interpol (rock band)
- "Precipitate", a song by Interpol from the EP Fukd ID 3
- Precipitate (Dead Zone), a 2003 episode of The Dead Zone

== See also ==
- Precipitation (disambiguation)
- Precipitate hardening
- Gold tin precipitate
- Red precipitate
