= Spondi =

Restaurant in Athens

- Interactive map of Spondi

Restaurant information
- Established: 1996
- Owner: Apostolos Trastelis
- Head chef: Arnaud Bignon
- Food type: French haute cuisine
- Rating: (Michelin Guide)
- Location: Athens, Greece
- Website: spondi.gr

Spondi is a fine dining restaurant in Athens. It is the first restaurant in Greece to be awarded a Michelin star.

== See also ==
- List of Michelin-starred restaurants in Greece
