= Precipitation (disambiguation) =

Precipitation is any meteorological phenomenon featuring water falling from the clouds, such as rain, snow, or hail.

Precipitation may also refer to:

- Alkaline precipitation, meteorological precipitation characterized by high alkalinity
- Precipitation (chemistry), condensation of a solid from a solution during a chemical reaction:
  - Ammonium sulfate precipitation, a method of purifying proteins
  - Precipitation hardening, a method used to strengthen malleable materials
  - Protein precipitation, a method of separating contaminants from biological products
    - For precipitation resulting from the denaturation of proteins, see coagulation
  - Ethanol precipitation, a method of concentrating DNA
- Precipitation (horse), a racehorse
- Electron precipitation, an atmospheric phenomenon that occurs when previously trapped electrons enter the Earth's atmosphere

== See also ==
- Coprecipitation
- Quantitative precipitation forecast
- Precipitate (disambiguation)
