= List of Michelin-starred restaurants in Greece =

As of the 2027 Michelin Guide, there are 20 restaurants in Greece with a Michelin star rating.

The Michelin Guides have been published by the French tire company Michelin since 1900. They were designed as a guide to tell drivers about eateries they recommended to visit and to subtly sponsor their tires, by encouraging drivers to use their cars more and therefore need to replace the tires as they wore out. Over time, the stars that were given out started to become more valuable.

Multiple anonymous Michelin inspectors visit the restaurants several times. They rate the restaurants on five criteria: "quality of products", "mastery of flavor and cooking techniques", "the personality of the chef represented in the dining experience", "value for money", and "consistency between inspectors' visits". Inspectors have at least ten years of expertise and create a list of popular restaurants supported by media reports, reviews, and diner popularity. If they reach a consensus, Michelin awards restaurants from one to three stars based on its evaluation methodology: One star means "high-quality cooking, worth a stop", two stars signify "excellent cooking, worth a detour", and three stars denote "exceptional cuisine, worth a special journey". The stars are not permanent and restaurants are constantly being re-evaluated. If the criteria are not met, the restaurant will lose its stars.

The 1987 edition was the first edition of the Michelin Guide to be published for Athens, Greece and the first Michelin star was awarded to Spondi in 2002. In 2026, the Michelin Guide was to expand its coverage in Greece to include the island of Santorini and the city of Thessaloniki. As a result, there were no Athens selections published in 2025. The results for all three Greece destinations were unveiled in October 2026, as the 2027 edition.

== Lists ==
=== 2020–2027 ===
Key
1 Michelin star	One Michelin star
2 Michelin stars	Two Michelin stars
—	The restaurant did not receive a star that year

Michelin-starred restaurants
Name	Cuisine	Location	2020	2021	2022	2023	2024	2025–2026 No guide	2027
Aleria	Greek	Athens – Metaxourgeio	—	—	—	—	—		1 Michelin star
Botrini's Athens	Mediterranean	Chalandri	1 Michelin star	1 Michelin star	1 Michelin star	1 Michelin star	1 Michelin star		1 Michelin star
Botrini's Santorini	Mediterranean	Santorini – Oia	—	—	—	—	—		1 Michelin star
CTC Urban Gastronomy	Modern	Athens – Kerameikos	—	1 Michelin star	1 Michelin star	1 Michelin star	1 Michelin star		1 Michelin star
Delta	Greek	Kallithea	—	—	2 Michelin stars	2 Michelin stars	2 Michelin stars		1 Michelin star
Hervé	Modern	Athens – Petralona	—	—	—	1 Michelin star	1 Michelin star		1 Michelin star
Hytra	Modern	Athens – Psirri	1 Michelin star	1 Michelin star	1 Michelin star	1 Michelin star	1 Michelin star		1 Michelin star
Lauda	Modern	Santorini – Oia	—	—	—	—	—		1 Michelin star
Lycabettus	Mediterranean	Santorini – Oia	—	—	—	—	—		2 Michelin stars
Makris Athens	Creative	Athens – Monastiraki	—	—	—	—	1 Michelin star		1 Michelin star
Patio	Modern	Vouliagmeni	—	—	—	1 Michelin star	1 Michelin star		1 Michelin star
Pelagos	Greek	Vouliagmeni	—	1 Michelin star	1 Michelin star	1 Michelin star	1 Michelin star		1 Michelin star
Seeds	Modern	Athens – Ilisia	—	—	—	—	—		1 Michelin star
Selene	Greek	Santorini – Fira	—	—	—	—	—		1 Michelin star
Sense	Creative	Athens – Makrygianni	—	—	—	—	—		1 Michelin star
Simul	Creative	Athens – Kolonaki	—	—	—	—	—		1 Michelin star
Soil	Modern	Athens – Pangrati	—	—	1 Michelin star	1 Michelin star	1 Michelin star		1 Michelin star
Spondi	French	Athens – Pangrati	2 Michelin stars	2 Michelin stars	1 Michelin star	1 Michelin star	1 Michelin star		1 Michelin star
Tudor Hall	Greek	Athens – Syntagma Square	—	—	—	1 Michelin star	1 Michelin star		1 Michelin star
Varoulko Seaside	Seafood	Piraeus	1 Michelin star	1 Michelin star	1 Michelin star	1 Michelin star	—		—
The Zillers	Greek	Athens – Monastiraki	—	—	1 Michelin star	1 Michelin star	1 Michelin star		1 Michelin star
Reference									

=== 2011–2019 ===
Key
1 Michelin star	One Michelin star
2 Michelin stars	Two Michelin stars
—	The restaurant did not receive a star that year
Closed	The restaurant is no longer open

Michelin-starred restaurants
Name	Cuisine	Location	2011	2012	2013	2014	2015	2016	2017	2018	2019
Botrini's	Mediterranean	Athens – Chalandri	—	—	—	1 Michelin star	1 Michelin star	1 Michelin star	1 Michelin star	1 Michelin star	1 Michelin star
Galazia Hytra	Mediterranean	Athens – Vouliagmeni	—	1 Michelin star	1 Michelin star	1 Michelin star	—	—	—	—	—
Funky Gourmet	Creative	Athens – Kerameikos	—	1 Michelin star	1 Michelin star	2 Michelin stars	2 Michelin stars	2 Michelin stars	2 Michelin stars	2 Michelin stars	Closed
Hytra	Modern	Athens – Psirri	1 Michelin star	—	1 Michelin star	1 Michelin star	1 Michelin star	1 Michelin star	1 Michelin star	1 Michelin star	1 Michelin star
Spondi	French	Athens – Pangrati	2 Michelin stars	2 Michelin stars	2 Michelin stars	2 Michelin stars	2 Michelin stars	2 Michelin stars	2 Michelin stars	2 Michelin stars	2 Michelin stars
Vardis	Traditional	Athens – Kifissia	1 Michelin star	—	—	—	—	—	—	—	—
Varoulko Seaside	Seafood	Athens – Piraeus	1 Michelin star	1 Michelin star	1 Michelin star	1 Michelin star	1 Michelin star	1 Michelin star	1 Michelin star	1 Michelin star	1 Michelin star
Reference											

=== 2002–2010 ===
Key
1 Michelin star	One Michelin star
2 Michelin stars	Two Michelin stars
—	The restaurant did not receive a star that year

Michelin-starred restaurants
Name	Cuisine	Location	2006	2007	2008	2009	2010
Hytra	Modern	Athens – Psirri	—	—	—	—	1 Michelin star
Pil Poul et Jerome Serres	French	Athens – Kerameikos	1 Michelin star	1 Michelin star	1 Michelin star	—	—
Spondi	French	Athens – Pangrati	1 Michelin star	1 Michelin star	2 Michelin stars	2 Michelin stars	2 Michelin stars
Vardis	Traditional	Athens – Kifissia	—	—	1 Michelin star	1 Michelin star	1 Michelin star
Varoulko Seaside	Seafood	Athens – Piraeus	1 Michelin star	1 Michelin star	1 Michelin star	1 Michelin star	1 Michelin star
Reference							

== Bibliography ==
- Michelin Guide Main Cities of Europe 2006. Michelin. 2006. ISBN 978-2-06-711579-8.
- Michelin Guide Main Cities of Europe 2007. Michelin. 2007. ISBN 978-2-06-712247-5.
- Michelin Guide Main Cities of Europe 2008. Michelin. 2008. ISBN 978-2-06-713019-7.
- Michelin Guide Main Cities of Europe 2009. Michelin. 2009. ISBN 978-2-06-713826-1.
- Michelin Guide Main Cities of Europe 2010. Michelin. 2010. ISBN 978-2-06-714682-2.
- Michelin Guide Main Cities of Europe 2011. Michelin. 2011. ISBN 978-2-06-715347-9.
- Michelin Guide Main Cities of Europe 2012. Michelin. 2012. ISBN 978-2-06-716976-0.
- Michelin Guide Main Cities of Europe 2013. Michelin. 2013. ISBN 978-2-06-718069-7.
- Michelin Guide Main Cities of Europe 2014. Michelin. 2014. ISBN 978-2-06-718904-1.
- Michelin Guide Main Cities of Europe 2015. Michelin. 2015. ISBN 978-2-06-719701-5.
- Michelin Guide Main Cities of Europe 2016. Michelin. 2016. ISBN 978-2-06-720638-0.
- Michelin Guide Main Cities of Europe 2017. Michelin. 2017. ISBN 978-2-06-721475-0.
- Michelin Guide Main Cities of Europe 2018. Michelin. 2018. ISBN 978-2-06-722378-3.
- Michelin Guide Main Cities of Europe 2019. Michelin. 2019. ISBN 978-2-06-723050-7.
- Michelin Guide Main Cities of Europe 2020. Michelin. 2020. ISBN 978-2-06-724190-9.
