= Siron (food) =

Pontic Greek dish

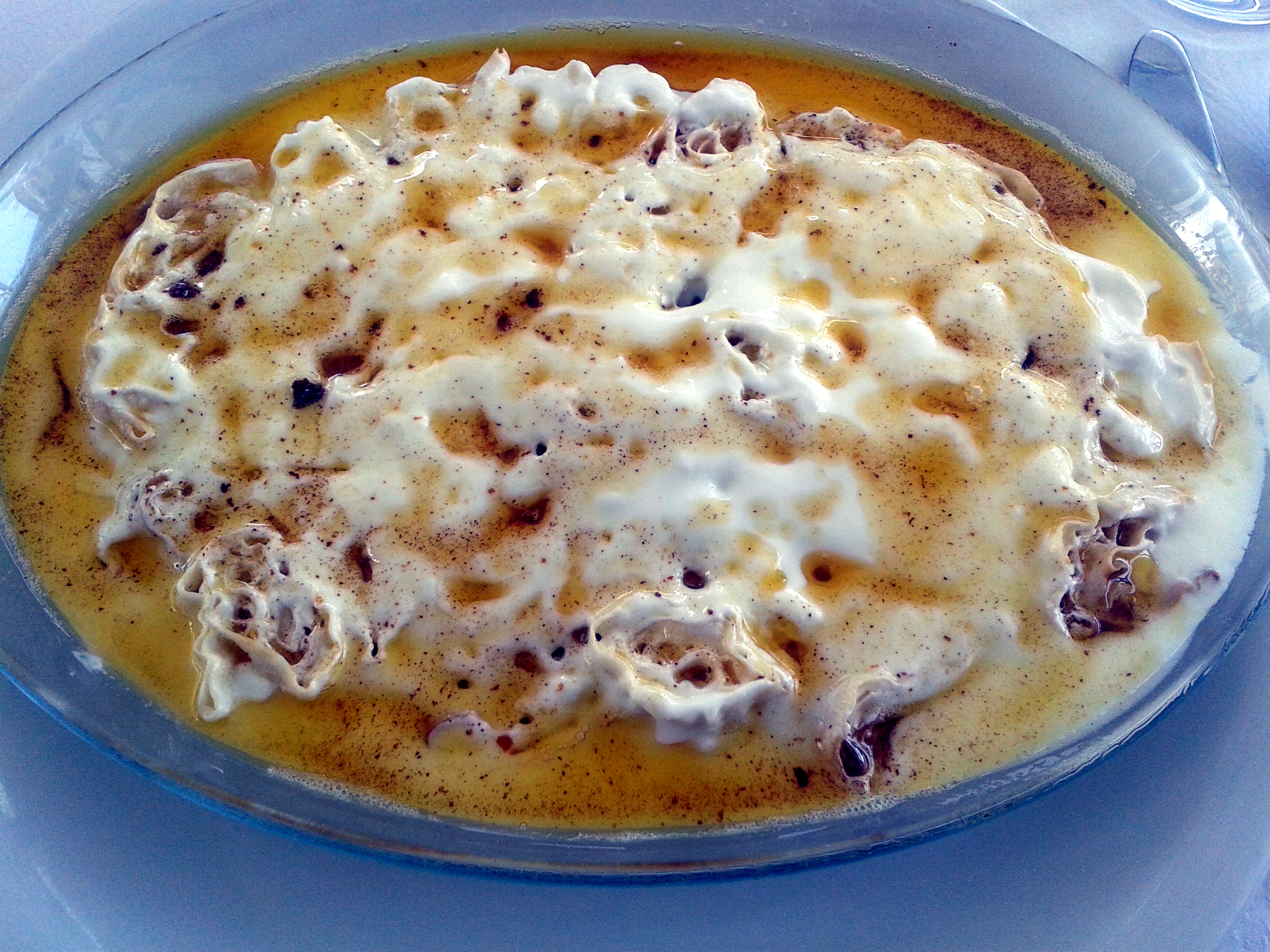
- Place of origin: Pontus (region)
- Region or state: Black Sea
- Main ingredients: Filo dough, yoghurt, butter and garlic

Siron (Greek: σιρόν), Ziron, Sinor or Silor is a pasta dish made with filo, yoghurt, butter and garlic. Its name varies from city to city, from region to region. It is consumed by Pontic Greeks, Laz people, and Turks living in the region of Pontus.

== Regional siron styles ==
- Gümüşhane Sironu
- Denizli Sironu
- Giresun Sironu

== See also ==
- Su böreği
