= Macedonian cuisine =

Culinary traditions of North Macedonia

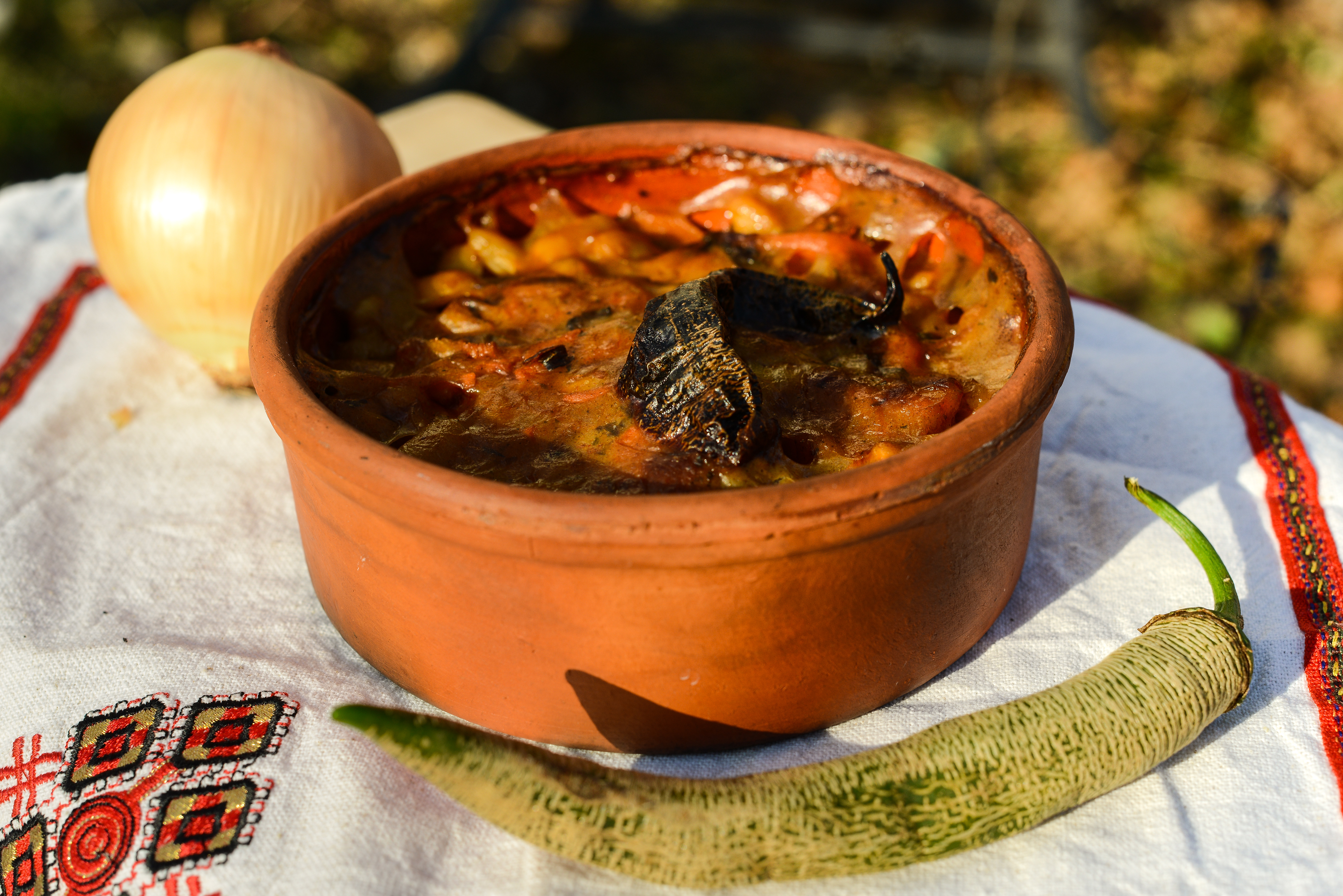
Tavče gravče, the national dish of North Macedonia.

Macedonian cuisine (Macedonian: Македонска кујна, romanized: Makedonska kujna) is the cuisine of North Macedonia. It is influenced by Ottoman and Balkan cuisines. The relatively warm climate of the country provides excellent growth conditions for a variety of vegetables, herbs and fruits. Macedonian cuisine is also noted for the diversity and quality of its dairy products, wines, and local alcoholic beverages, such as rakija. Tavče gravče and mastika are considered the national dish and drink of North Macedonia.

== Foods ==
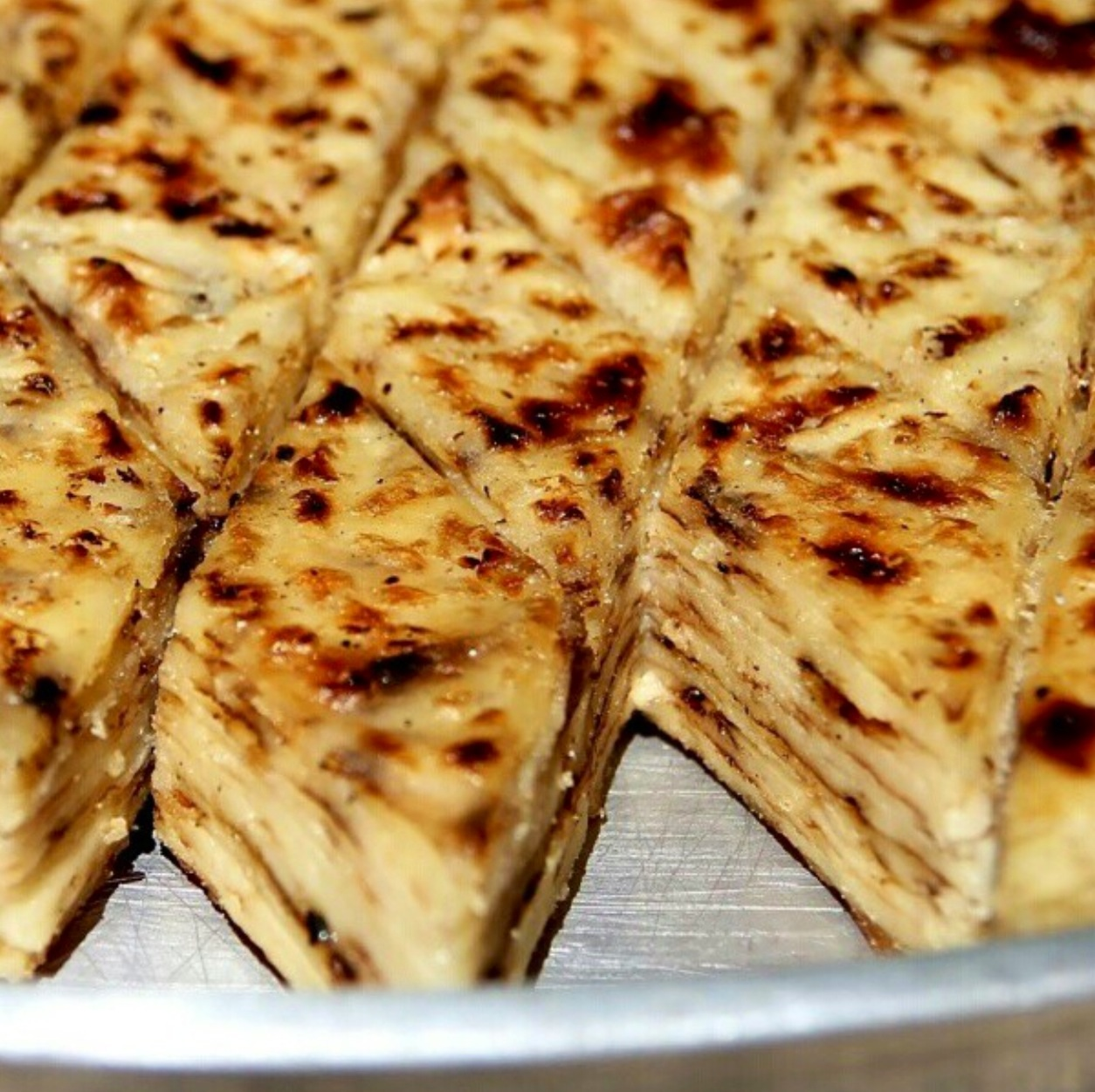
Ǵomleze, typically cut into diamond-shaped pieces, prepared on a tray.

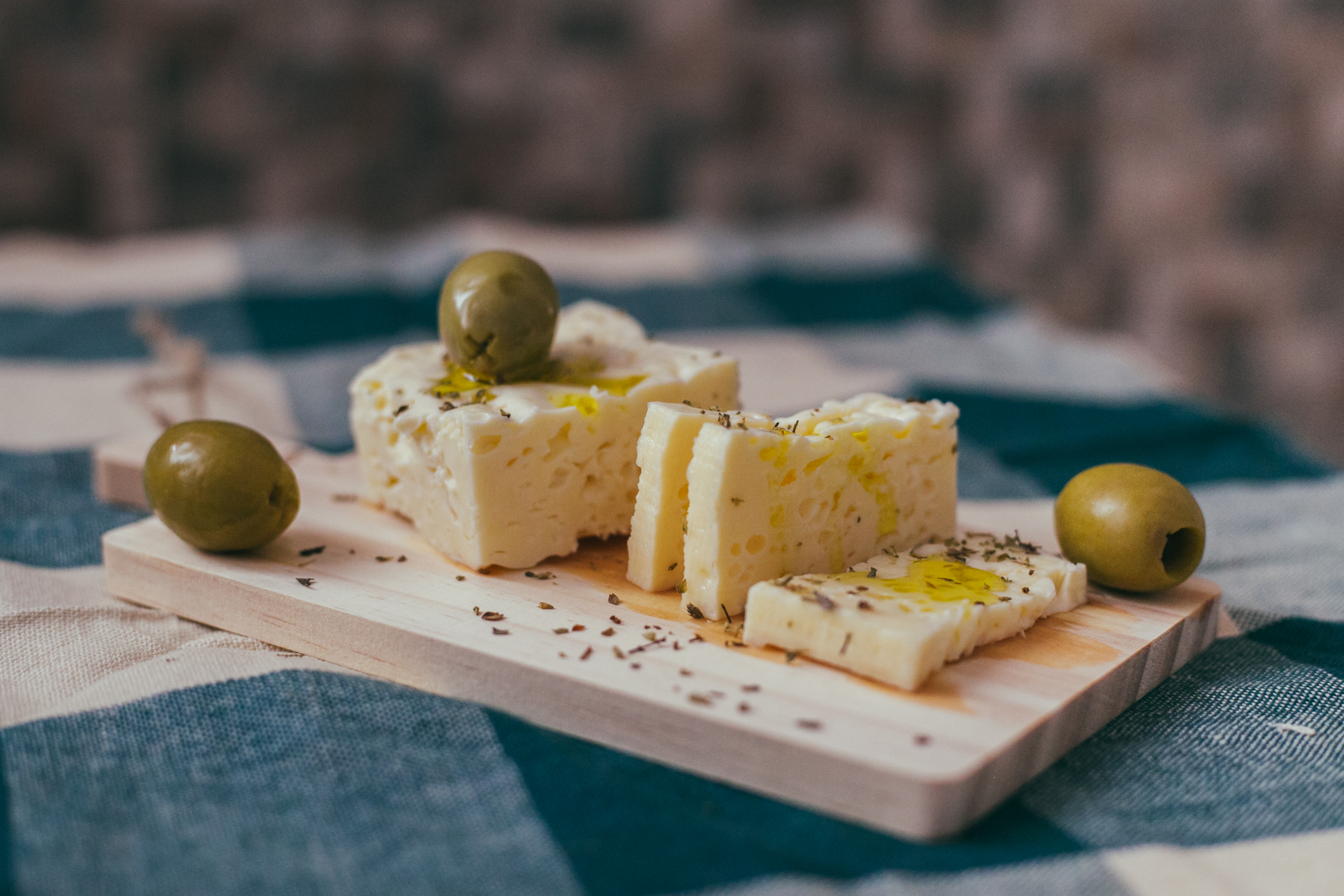
Bieno siren̂e served with olives

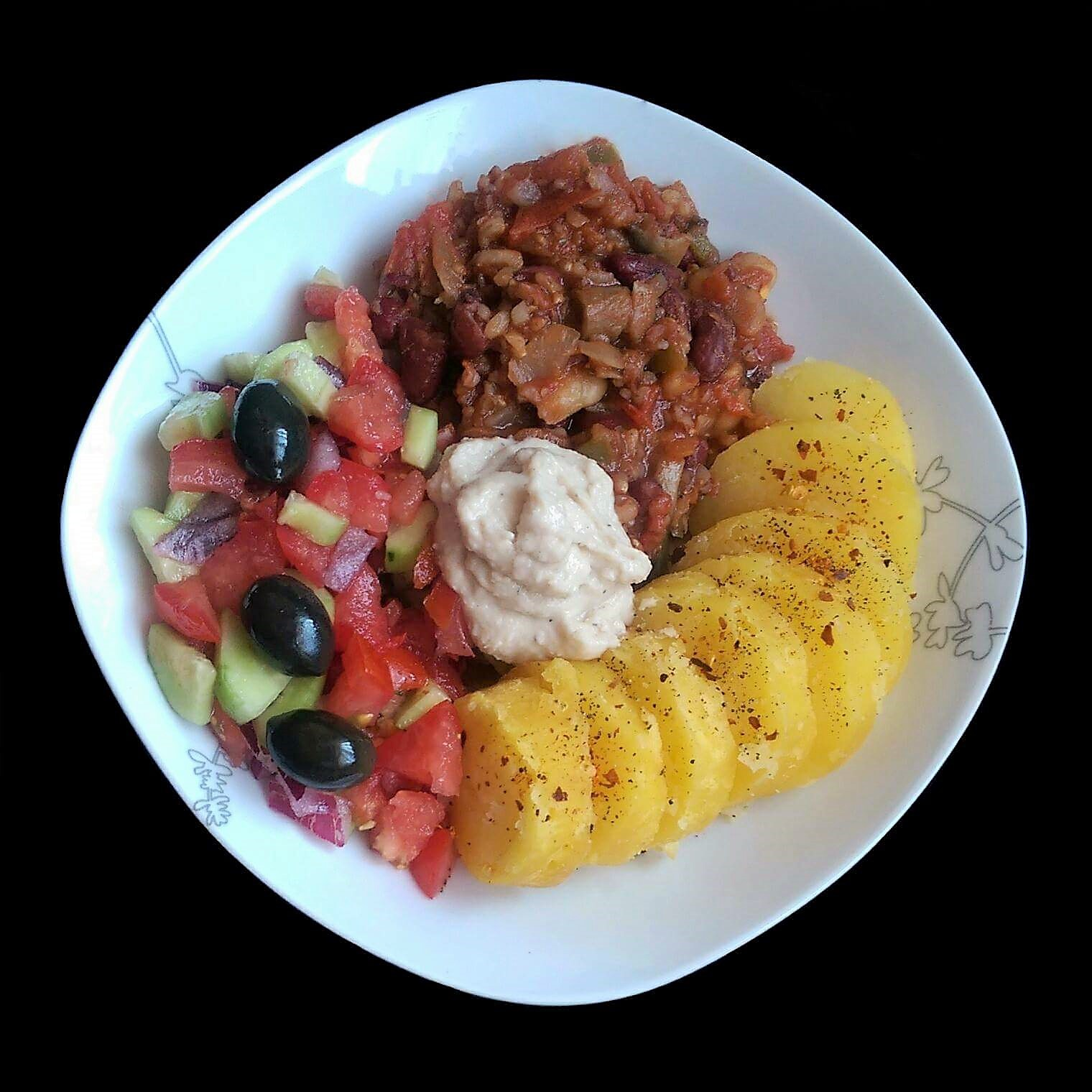
Turli tava (baked vegetables) with baked potato and salad

- Tavče gravče
- Turli tava
- Flia, traditional in the Tetovo region, also known as Ǵomleze in the Ohrid and Struga region. different from the Turkish gozleme
- Ajvar, roasted red pepper spread; can be mild or hot
- Kebapchinja
- Šopska salad
- Polneti piperki, stuffed bell peppers; usually filled with rice or rice with meat
- Embroidered peppers, threaded peppers served fresh, dry or as a spice
- Ohrid trout, an endemic species of trout in Lake Ohrid
- Pita (pastry)
- Burek
- Malidžano, an eggplant spread
- Musaka
- Makalo
- Pindžur, a spicy vegetable relish
- Popara
- Pastrmajlija
- Šarplaninski ovčji, or kaškaval (hard sheep's milk cheese from the Šar Mountains (Šar planina in Macedonian))
- Bieno siren̂e, a cheese originating from the Mariovo region that shares similarities with the more commonly known halloumi
- Urda cheese
- Širden and kukurek
- Sarma
- Kiselo zele and rasolnica (sour cabbage)
- Mekici (also known as tiganici or pishii), fried lumps of dough
- Čorba od kopriva (creamy nettle soup)
- Kompir mandžа (a potato-and-meat stew)
- Pleskavica (also šarska, ajdučka and makedonka)
- Kačamak (also known as bakrdan)
- Zelnik
- Selsko meso, roast beef, pork and lamb with mushrooms, white wine and yellow cheese on top, usually cooked in a clay pot
- Tarator
- Jufki, Macedonian pasta
- Prženi lepčin̂a, slices of bread covered in beaten egg, then fried
- Lutiče (made by roasting peppers and tomatoes with black pepper then put in a jar like a sauce-spread)
- Pitulici (very thin and salty pancakes)
- Leblebija

== Desserts ==
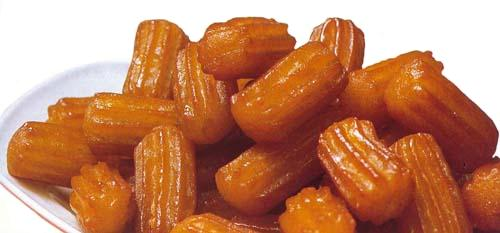
Tulumba

- Kadaif
- Tulumba
- Palačinki
- Kompot
- Lokum
- Baklava
- Slatko
- Sutlijaš
- Alva

== Drinks ==
=== Coffee ===
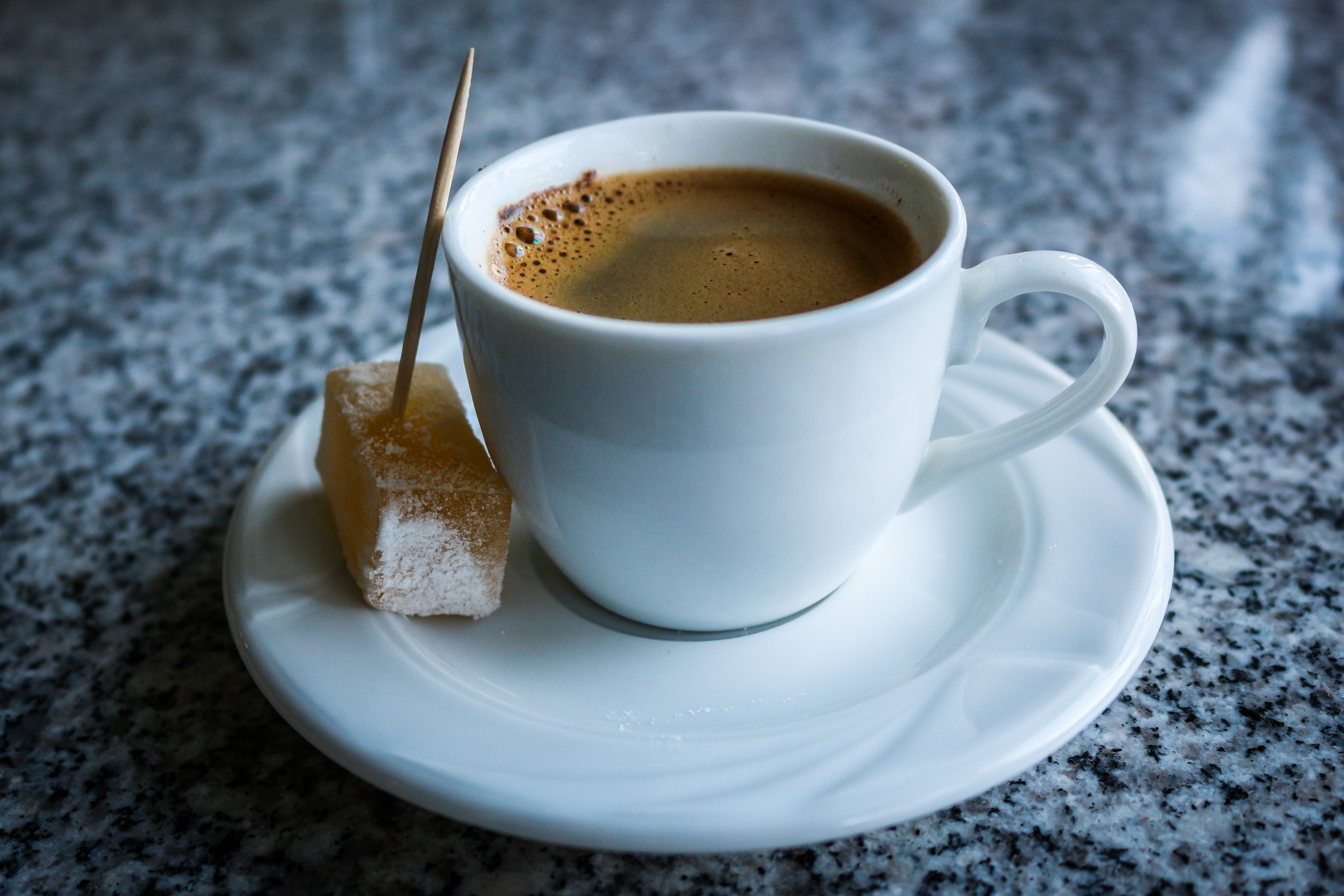
Macedonian coffee, with lokum

North Macedonia has a well-developed coffee culture, and Turkish coffee is by far the most popular coffee beverage. With over 5,000 establishments, the traditional Balkan coffeehouse and bar—the kafeana— is one of the most common places to go out and have a drink. However, because of the negative stereotypes surrounding the kafana, many younger people prefer to frequent the more Western-styled cafés which are also seen as being classier.

From the days of the Ottoman Empire through to the present, coffee has played an important role in the lifestyle and culture of the region. The serving and consumption of coffee has had a profound effect on betrothal and gender customs, political and social interaction, prayer, and hospitality customs. Although many of the rituals are not prevalent in today's society, coffee has remained an integral part of Macedonian culture.

Other coffee beverages such as lattes, cafe mochas and cappuccinos are becoming increasingly popular with the opening of more upmarket cafés. Professionals and businesspeople have contributed to the popularity of instant coffee (especially frappé).

=== Alcohol ===
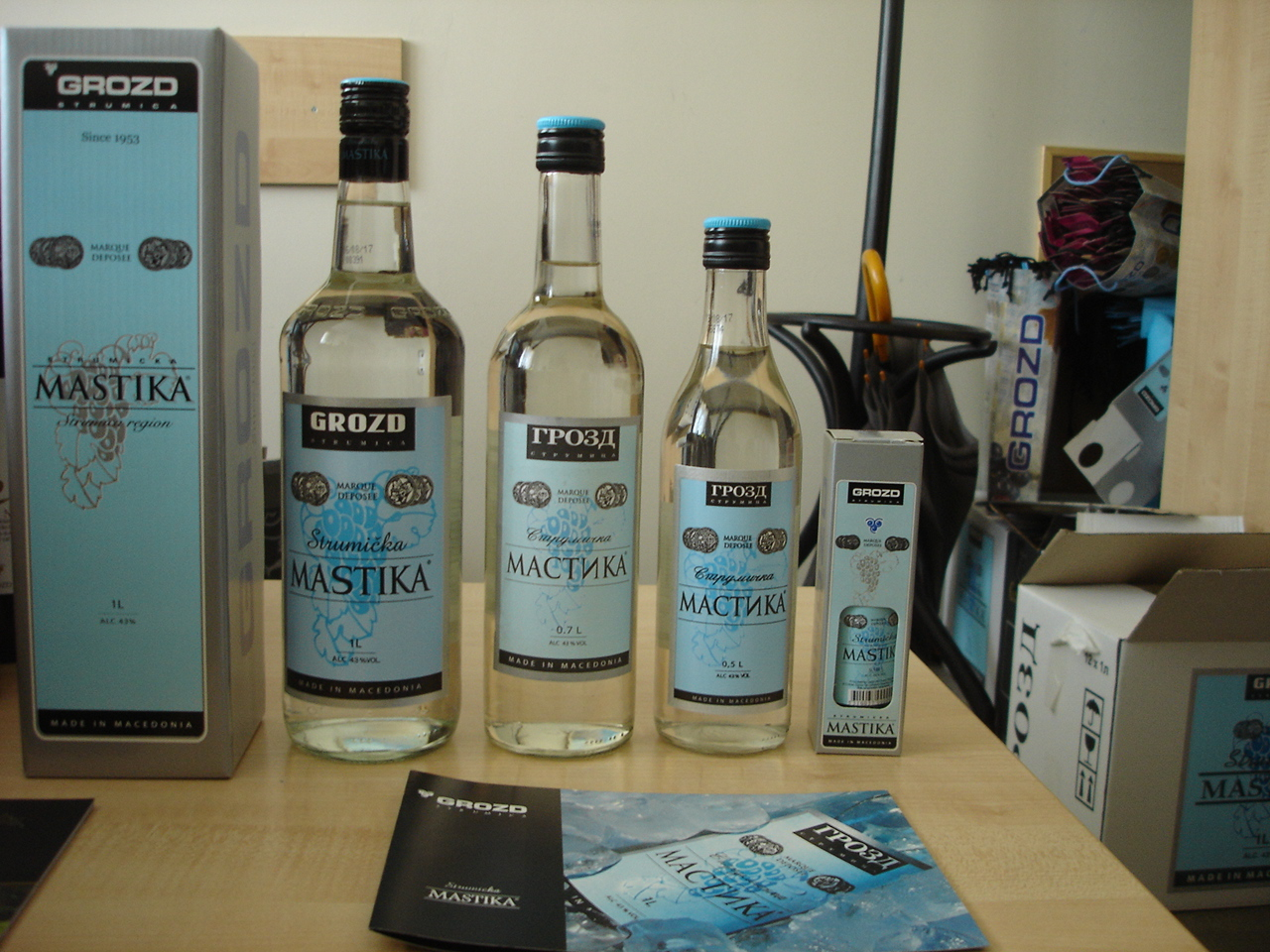
The best known Macedonian brand of Mastika, Strumicka Mastika. In North Macedonia, Mastika is traditionally made in the Strumica region

- Wine
  - Stanušina Crna
  - Vranec
  - Traminec
  - Alexandria
  - Smederevka

Traditionally, white wine would be consumed in the summer, and red wine in winter.

- Mastika
- Rakija
- Beer
  - Skopsko
  - Krali Marko
  - Zlaten Dab
  - Gorsko
  - Bitolsko
  - Kenbach
  - Makedonsko
  - Starogradsko
- Boza, a drink made from millet, traditionally sold by ethnic Albanian vendors.

=== Non-alcoholic ===
- Mountain tea
- Salep
- Yoghurt (Kefir)
- Mineral water
  - Gorska Voda
  - Pelisterka
  - Pela Rosa
  - Ilina
  - Kožuvčanka
  - Ladna

== See also ==
- Cincinnati chili
- Cuisine of the Mediterranean
- Eastern European cuisine
- European cuisine
