= Bilz =

Bilz may refer to:

- Friedrich Eduard Bilz (1842–1922), German naturopath
- Bilz y Pap, marketing name of soft drinks in Chile
