= Makalo =

Macedonian dipping sauce typically made from garlic and oil

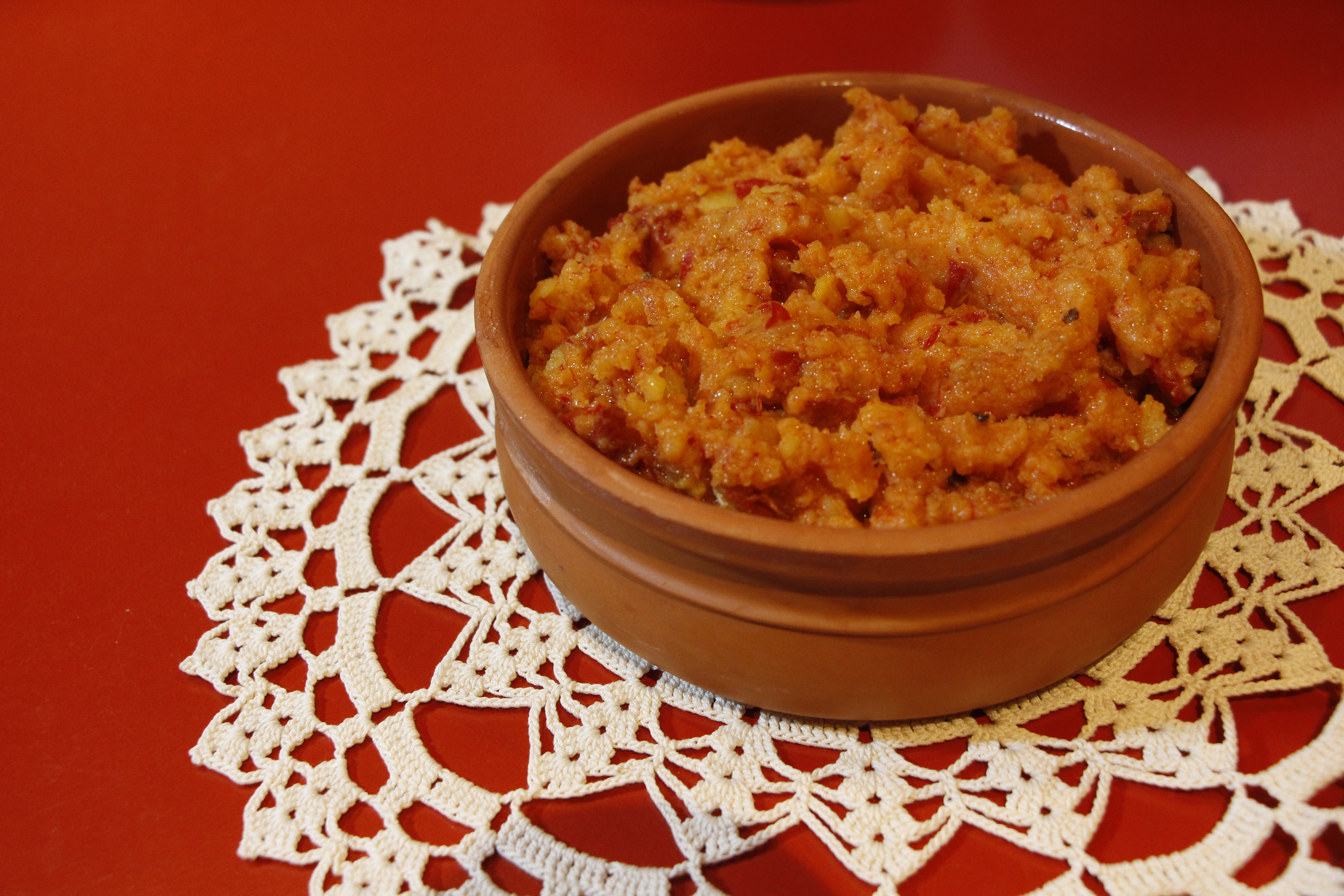
- Traditional Macedonian Makalo
- Alternative names: Макало
- Course: Side dish
- Place of origin: North Macedonia
- Region or state: Ohrid
- Main ingredients: Garlic

Makalo (Macedonian: Макало) is a traditional Macedonian side dish. The main ingredients include oil, garlic and peppers although variations in the recipe can also include dry embroidered peppers, mashed potatoes, aubergine, leek and onion. It is usually served as an addition to stews or as a spread on bread.

== Etymology ==
The name makalo comes from the Macedonian verb "to dip" (Macedonian: мака, transliterated as maka) to describe how this side dish is usually used. There are several variations of the dish in North Macedonia, including the one from Ohrid, lukarnik which is served in the town of Veles.

== Gallery ==
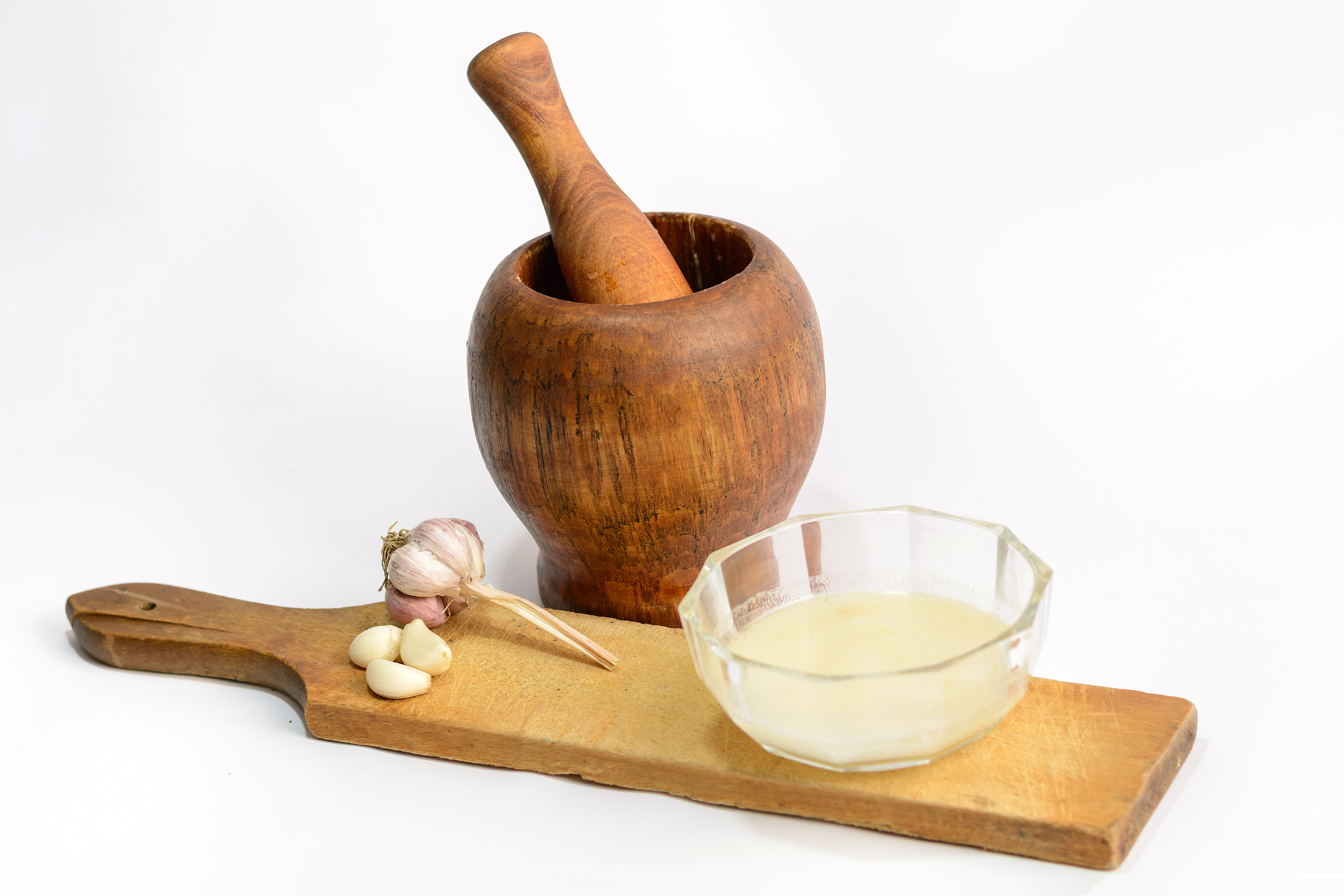
Garlic-based makalo

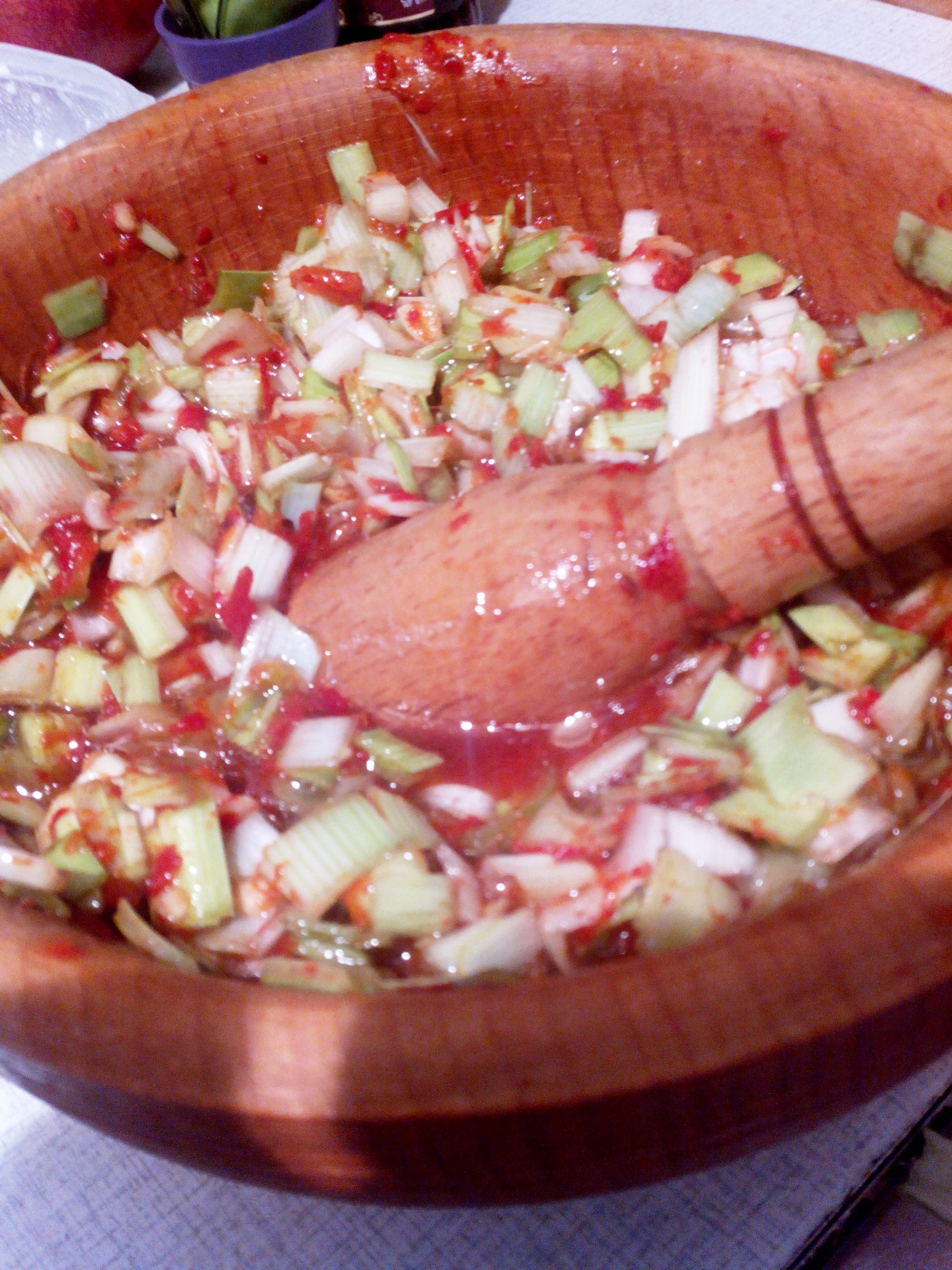
Leek and dry pepper-based makalo

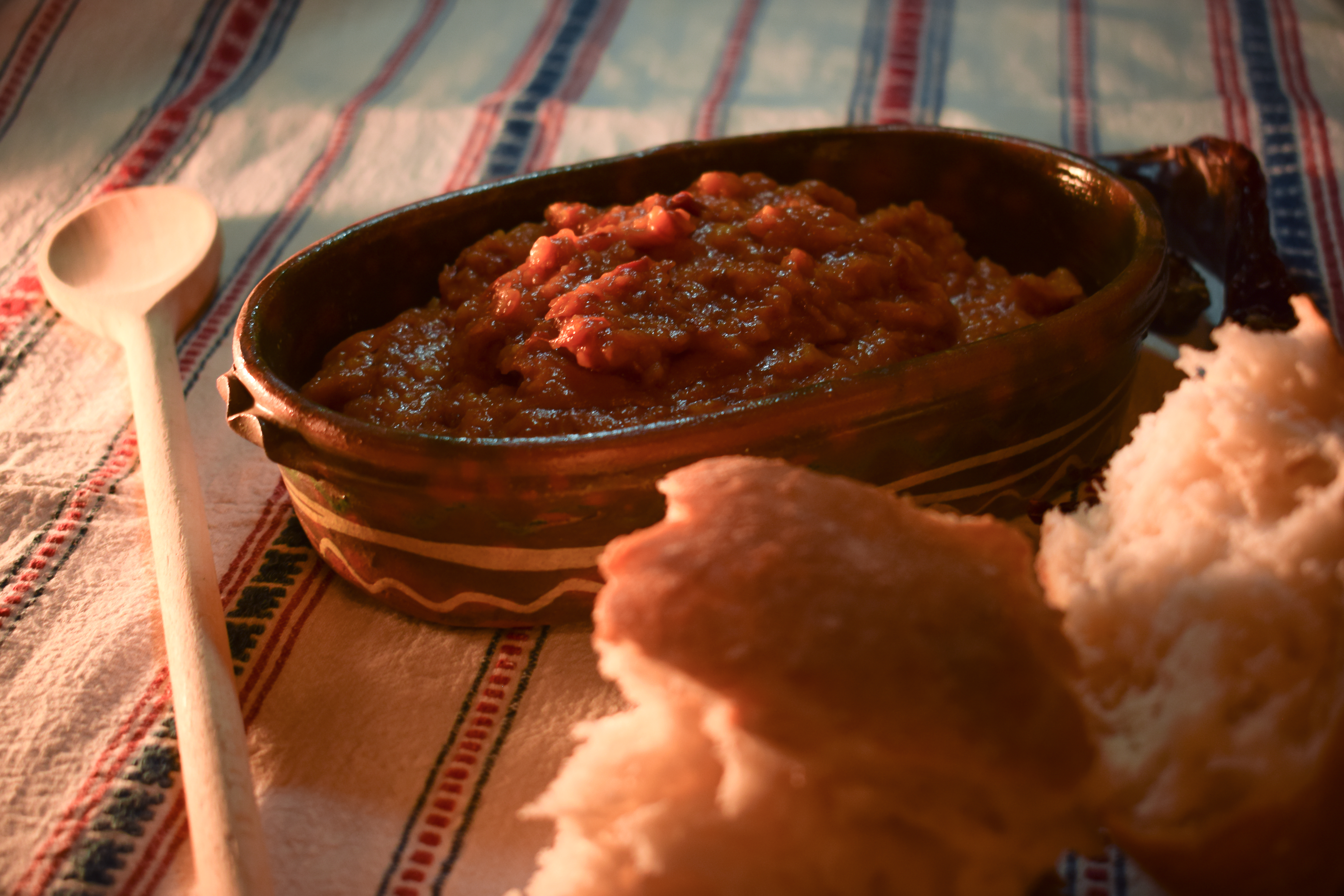
Dry pepper-based makalo

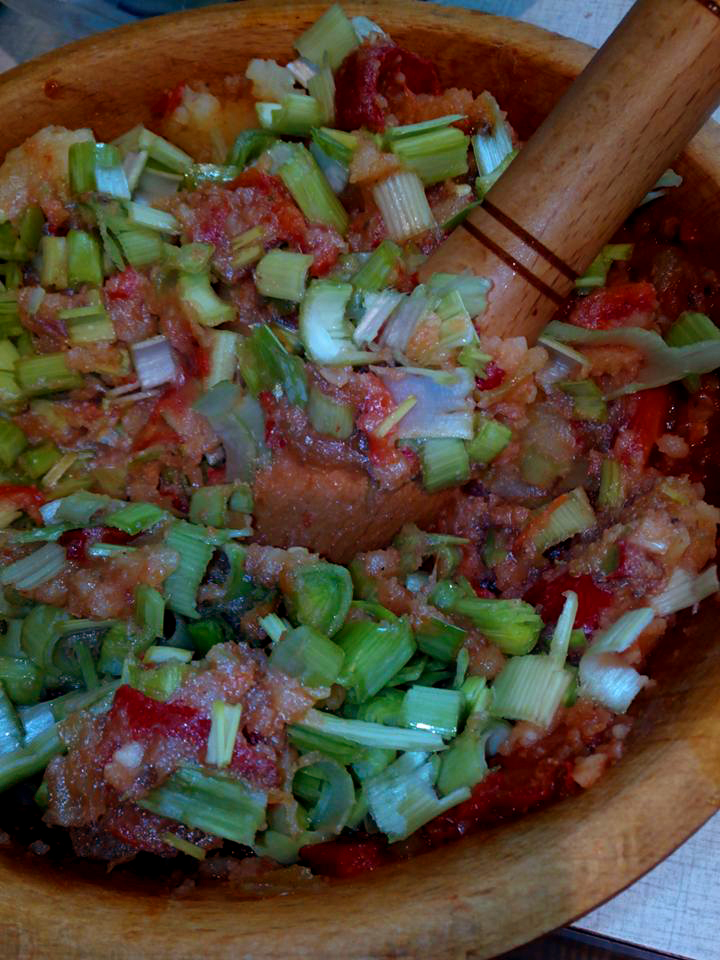
Baked pepper and leek-based makalo

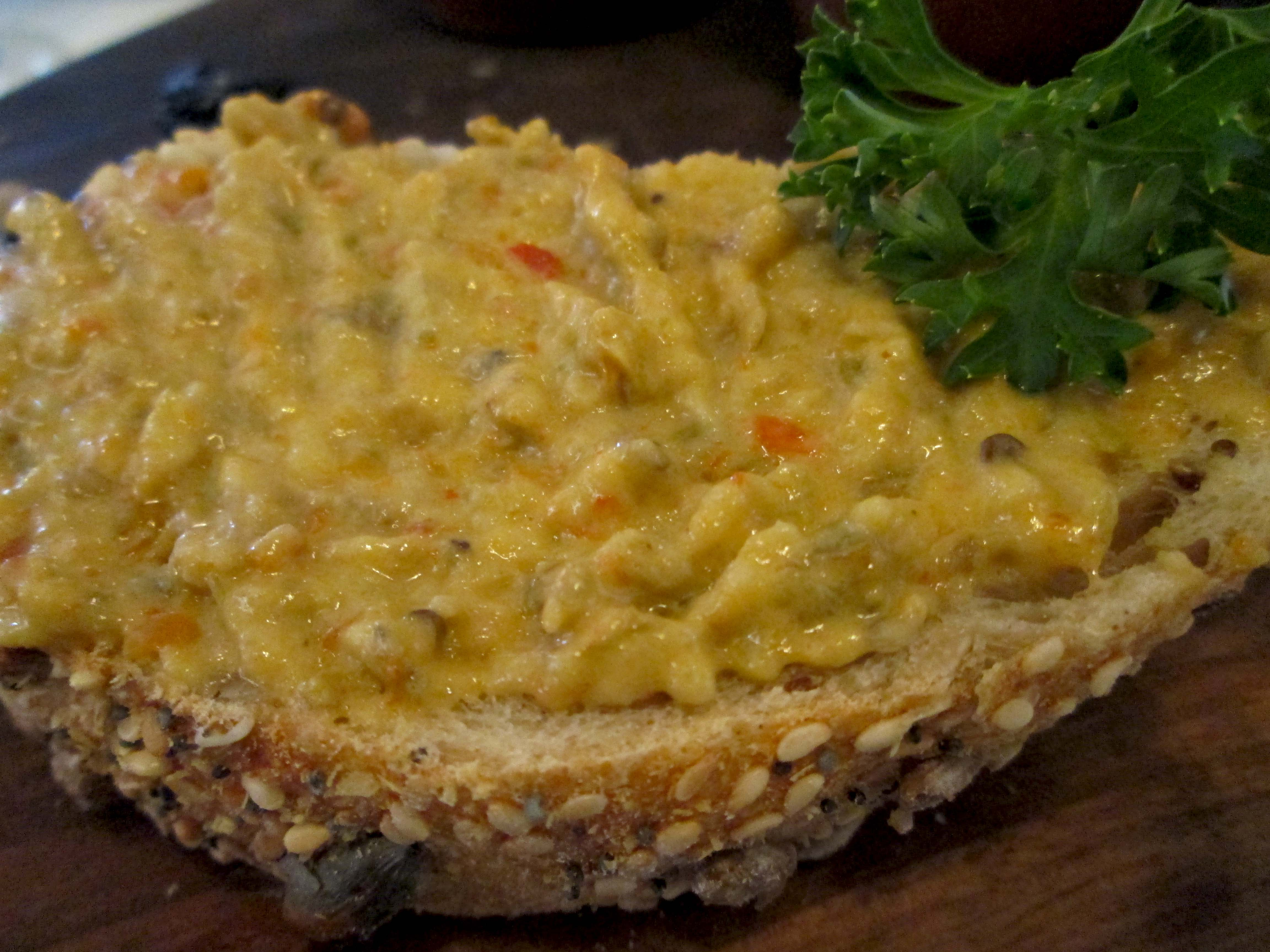
Makalo on bread

== See also ==
- Balkan cuisine
- Eastern European cuisine
