= Shirdan =

Turkish dish

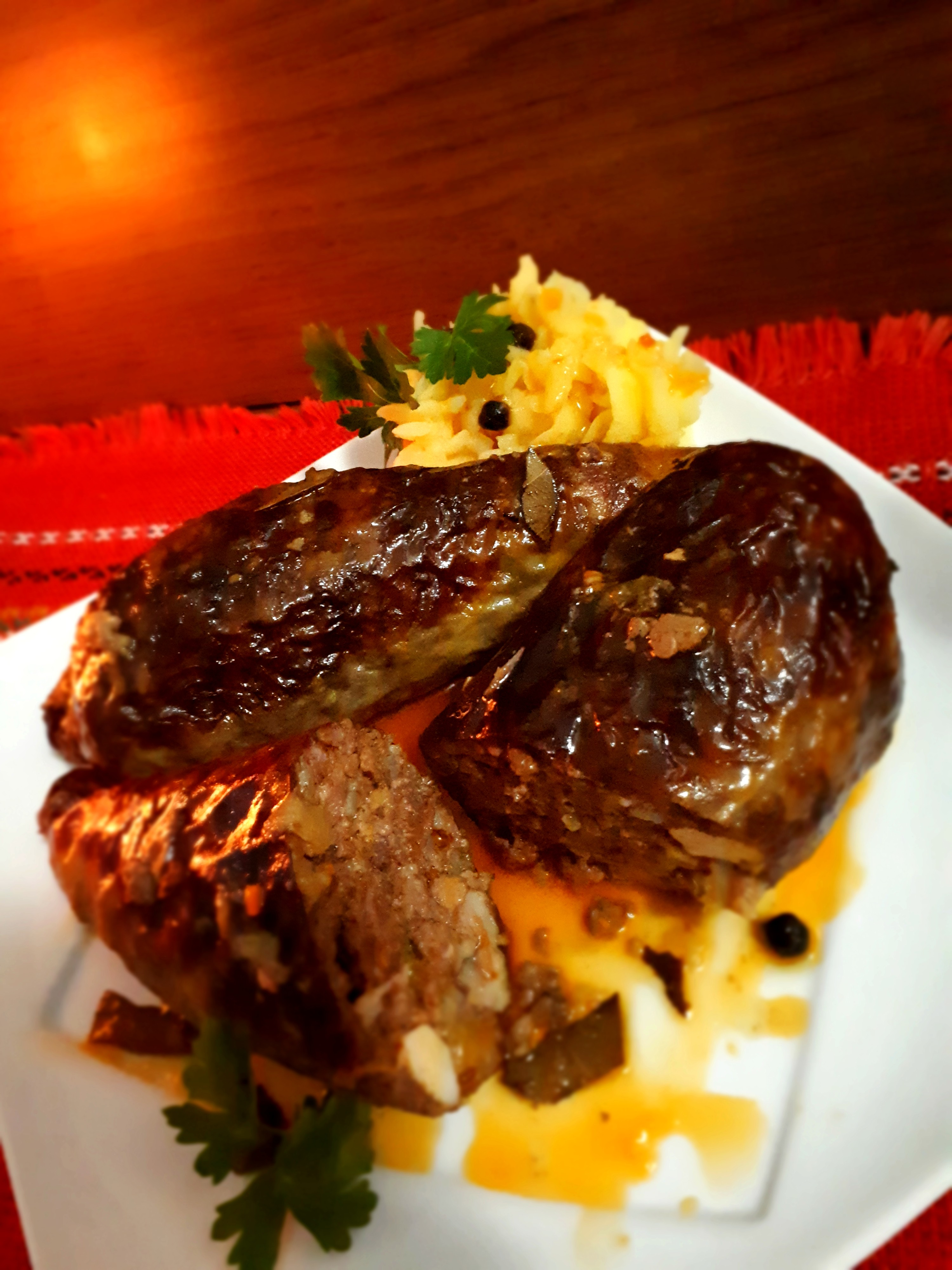
- Alternative names: şırdan, shirden, شیردان or Ширден
- Course: Main
- Serving temperature: Hot

Shirdan, also spelled şırdan, shirden, شیردان or Ширден is an offal dish consumed in Western Asia. It is prepared by washing the abomasum (lower stomach) of a sheep and then stuffing it with chopped meat, onions, and paprika, then further seasoning it with black pepper, pimento and salt. Water is then added and the opened cavity is sewn with a needle and thread. Lastly, it is baked with animal fat in an earthen casserole.

This frequently consumed dish in Adana, Turkey is considered a regional specialty and it is a business opportunity for locals. Due to the insufficiency of sheep in Adana, raw meat is brought in from other Turkish cities.

Shirden is also a specialty of the Macedonian cuisine and the general Balkan cuisine.
