= Kozuvcanka =

Macedonian beverage company

Kozuvcanka D.O.O.
- Logo of Kozuvcanka
- Industry: Beverage company
- Founded: 1993 (de facto), 11 May 1995 (de jure)
- Founder: Nikola Jančev; Stojan Jančev
- Headquarters: Kavadarci
- Area served: North Macedonia (predominantly); Europe; North America; Australia
- Products: Kozuvcanka mineral water; Izvorska; Sinalco products (distributor role); Naše Makedonsko; Lifer; Bunar
- Revenue: ▲MKD 1,104,417,824 (2024)
- Net income: ▲MKD 44,019,000 (2024)
- Owner: Mitko Jančev (75%); Janinka Čhuparkoska (25%)
- Members: 150
- Website: https://kozuvcanka.mk/

Kozuvcanka D.O.O., commonly known as Kozuvcanka (Macedonian: Кожувчанка, romanized: Kožuvčanka), is a Macedonian beverage company limited by shares founded in 1993 in Kavadarci by brothers Nikola and Stojan Jančev. Its water comes from Kožuf, from where the company got its name.

== History ==
Kozuvcanka was founded in 1993 by brothers Nikola and Stojan Jančev in Kavadarci. The company was initially launched as a private initiative to utilize the mineral water resources of Kožuf, located near the city.

On 11 May 1995, the company was officially founded.

In 2005, Kozuvcanka signed an agreement with German beverage brand Sinalco, becoming the distributor of Sinalco soft drinks in North Macedonia.

The company expanded further in 2008, launching Izvorska, a sub-brand of still spring water. It later diversified into the production of beer, including the draft beer Naše Makedonsko and the craft beer Lifer.

Kozuvcanka was among the founding members of Pakomak D.O.O. Skopje, a non-profit organization for packaging waste management established on December 3, 2010.

During the COVID-19 pandemic, the company donated 100,000 bottles of Izvorska and 22,000 cans of the beverage Sinetta to the regional vaccination point in Kavadarci, and agreed to donate Izvorska to all vaccination points nationwide.

== Operations ==
The company operates from its headquarters and bottling facility in Kavadarci, where it employs approximately 150 workers. Kozuvcanka manages several products across multiple packaging formats, including PET bottles, glass bottles, and aluminum cans.

Kozuvcanka is certified under several international standards, including ISO 9001:2015 for quality management, ISO 22000:2005 for food safety, and Halal certification. The company also adheres to environmental and occupational health standards through certifications such as ISO 14001:2015 and OHSAS 18000:2007.

Kozuvcanka's products are widely distributed throughout North Macedonia and are also exported to Europe, North America, and Australia.

== Products ==
Kozuvcanka's products include:

- Kozuvcanka carbonated mineral water, packaged in PET bottles, aluminum cans, or glass bottles, and available with lemon flavour and in the vitamin form of Kozuvcanka Active and Kozuvcanka Wellness
- Izvorska, a still spring water brand packaged in eco-friendly packaging
- Sinalco distributed brands, such as Sinalco Soft Drinks, Sinetta Fruit Juices, Sinalco Ice Tea and Energis Energy Drinks
- Beer products such as Naše Makedonsko and Lifer
- Bunar, a flavoured alcoholic drink consisting of 55% white table wine, 23% natural mineral water, and 22% lemon-flavoured soft drink

== Awards ==
In 2017, Kozuvcanka was recognized by the Economic Chamber of North Macedonia for its significant investment in beer production and distribution, valued at €1,270,000.00.

On May 17, 2025, Janinka Čuparkoska, one of the owners of Kozuvcanka, received the "Leading woman" statuette at the "Selection of the Most Successful Women Managers" event in Skopje.
