= Kem (drink) =

Domestically-produced soft drink in Chile

Kem Piña
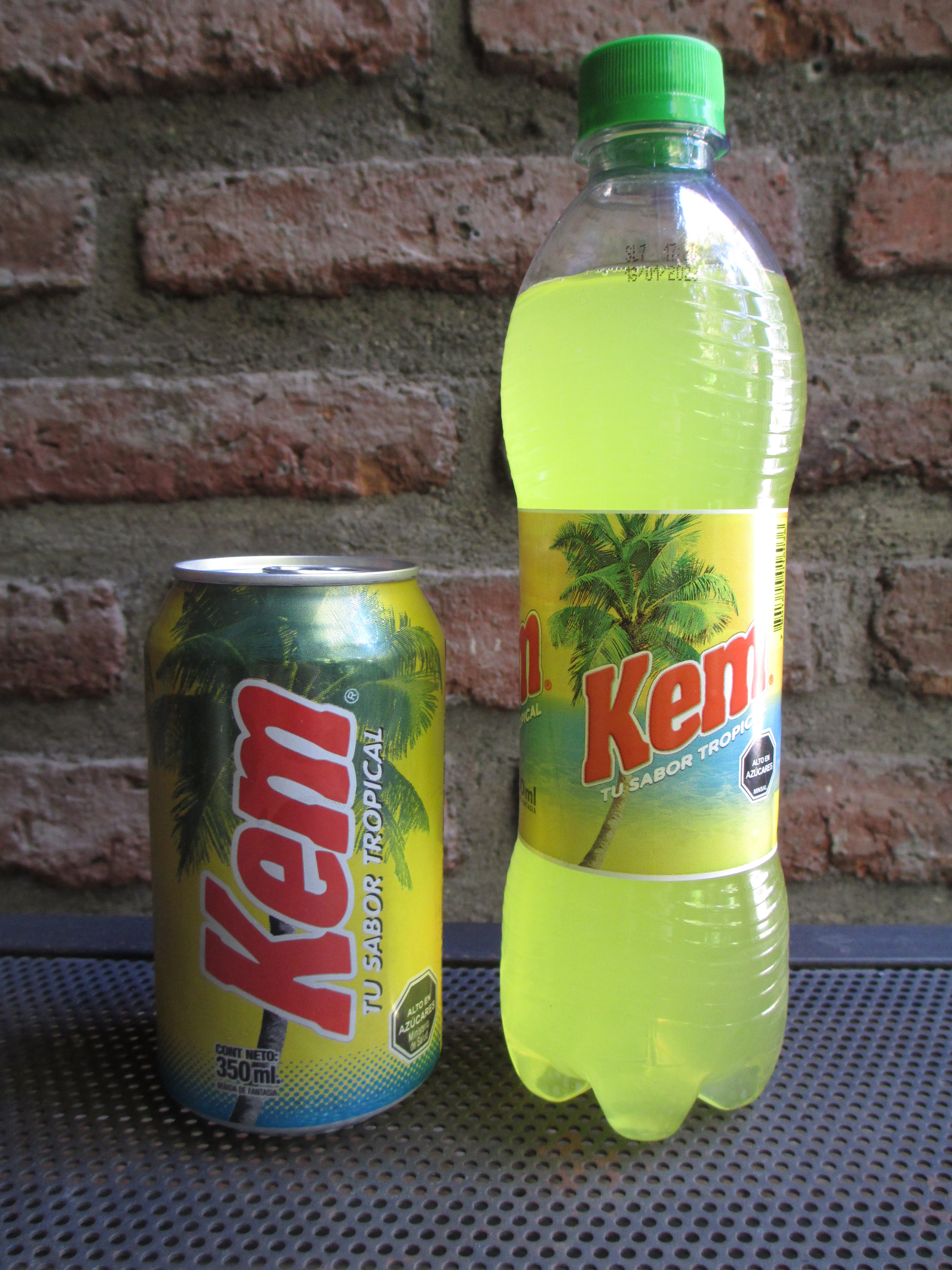
- Type: Soft drink
- Manufacturer: CCU
- Country of origin: Santiago, Chile
- Introduced: 1975; 50 years ago (Kem Ginger Ale); 1982; 43 years ago (Kem Piña)
- Colour: Yellow
- Variants: Kem Zero; Kem Piña Maracuya; Kem Xtreme; Kem Xtreme Sugar Free; Kem Xtreme AM; Kem Xtreme PM
- Related products: Bilz y Pap
- Website: www.ccu.cl/marcas-productos/kem/

Kem, also known as Kem Piña (Spanish for Pineapple Kem), is the name of a soft drink produced in Chile by CCU.

== Overview ==
Kem was created in 1975 by CCU under the name "Kem Ginger Ale". Originally a ginger ale drink, Kem would rebrand itself as "Kem Piña" in 1982, changing its flavor to pineapple.

Through the years, Kem has introduced different flavor variants. These include Kem Zero, Kem Piña-Maracuyá and Kem Xtreme.
