= Penig =

- Town
- Coat of arms

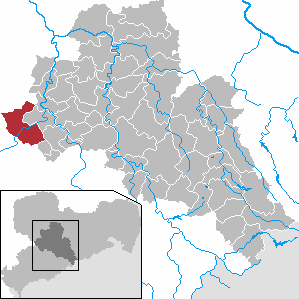
- Location of Penig within Mittelsachsen district
- Interactive map of Penig
- Location within Germany Location within Saxony
- Coordinates: 50°56′1″N 12°42′21″E
- Country: Germany
- State: Saxony
- District: Mittelsachsen

Government
  - Mayor (2020–27): André Wolf (CDU)

Area
  - Total: 63.37 km^{2} (24.47 sq mi)
- Elevation: 208 m (682 ft)

Population (2025-12-31)
  - Total: 7,970
  - Density: 126/km^{2} (326/sq mi)
- Time zone: UTC+01:00 (CET)
  - Summer (DST): UTC+02:00 (CEST)
- Postal codes: 09322
- Dialling codes: 037381
- Vehicle registration: FG
- Website: www.penig.de

Penig (German: [ˈpeːnɪç]) is a town in the district of Mittelsachsen, in the Free State of Saxony, Germany. It is situated on the river Zwickauer Mulde, 19 km northwest of Chemnitz. The old and the new castle were owned by the House of Schönburg from 1378 until 1945. Penig housed a concentration camp during World War II.

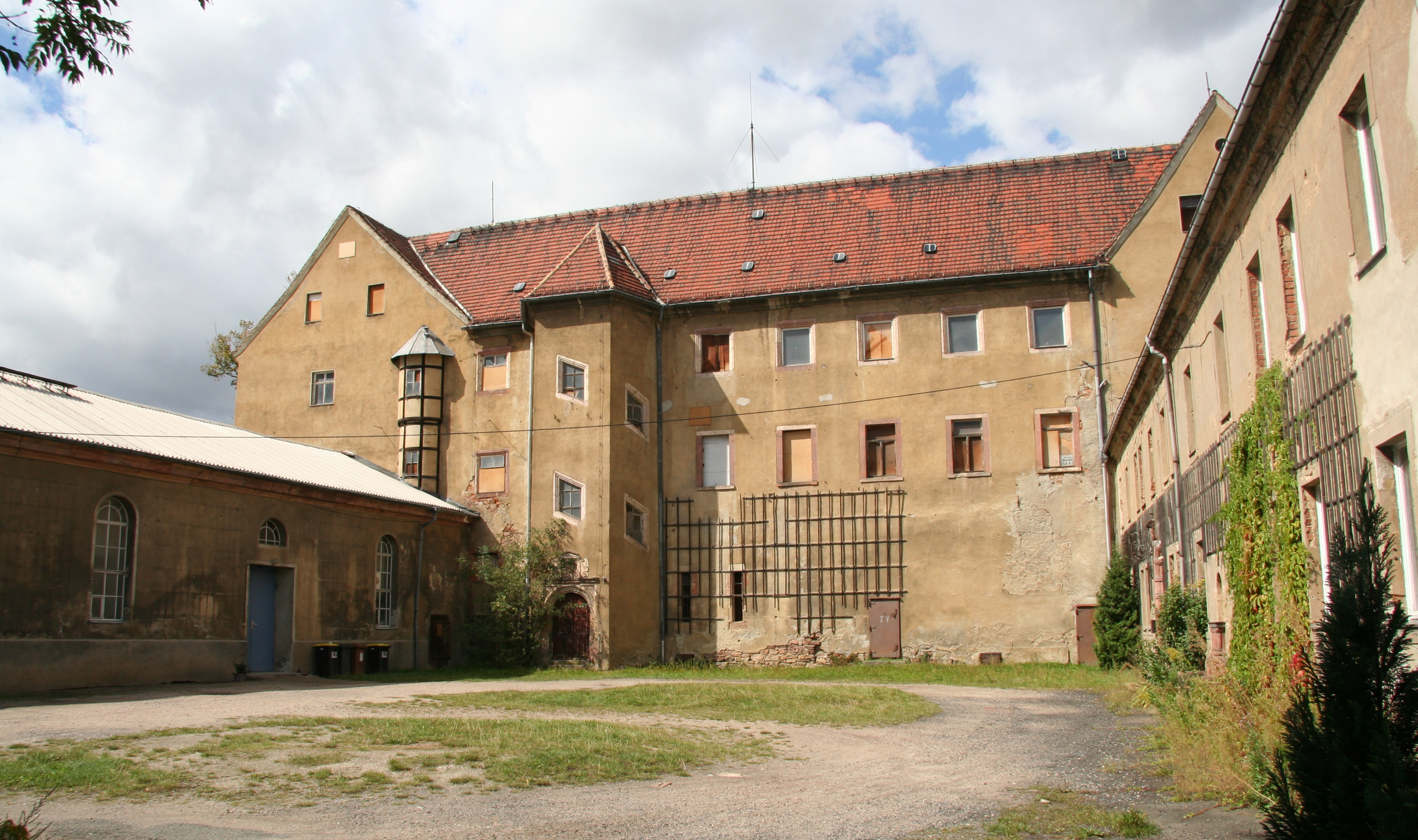
The Old Castle

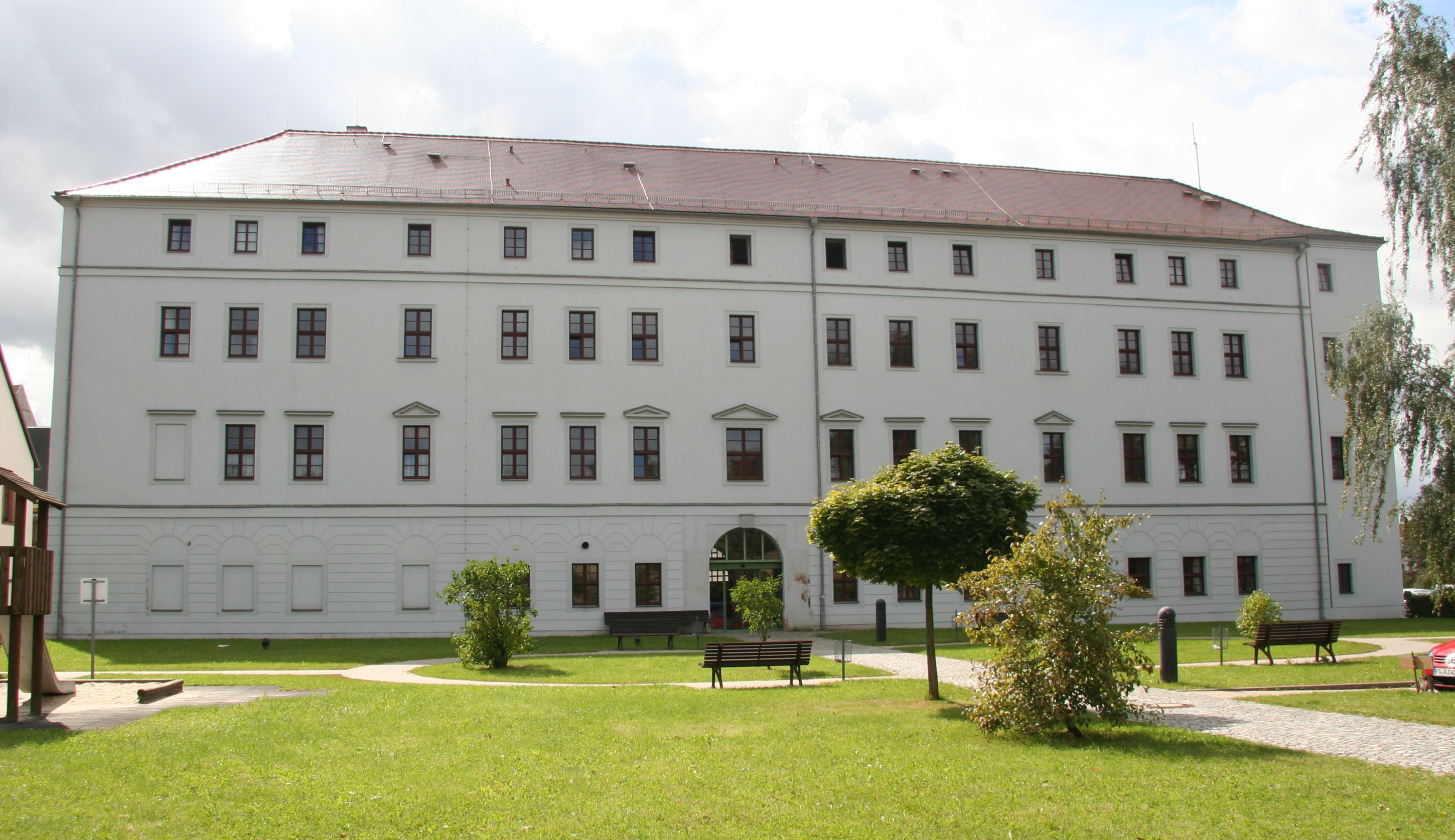
The New Castle

== People ==
- Friedrich Eduard Bilz
