= Bilz y Pap =

Domestically-produced soft drinks in Chile

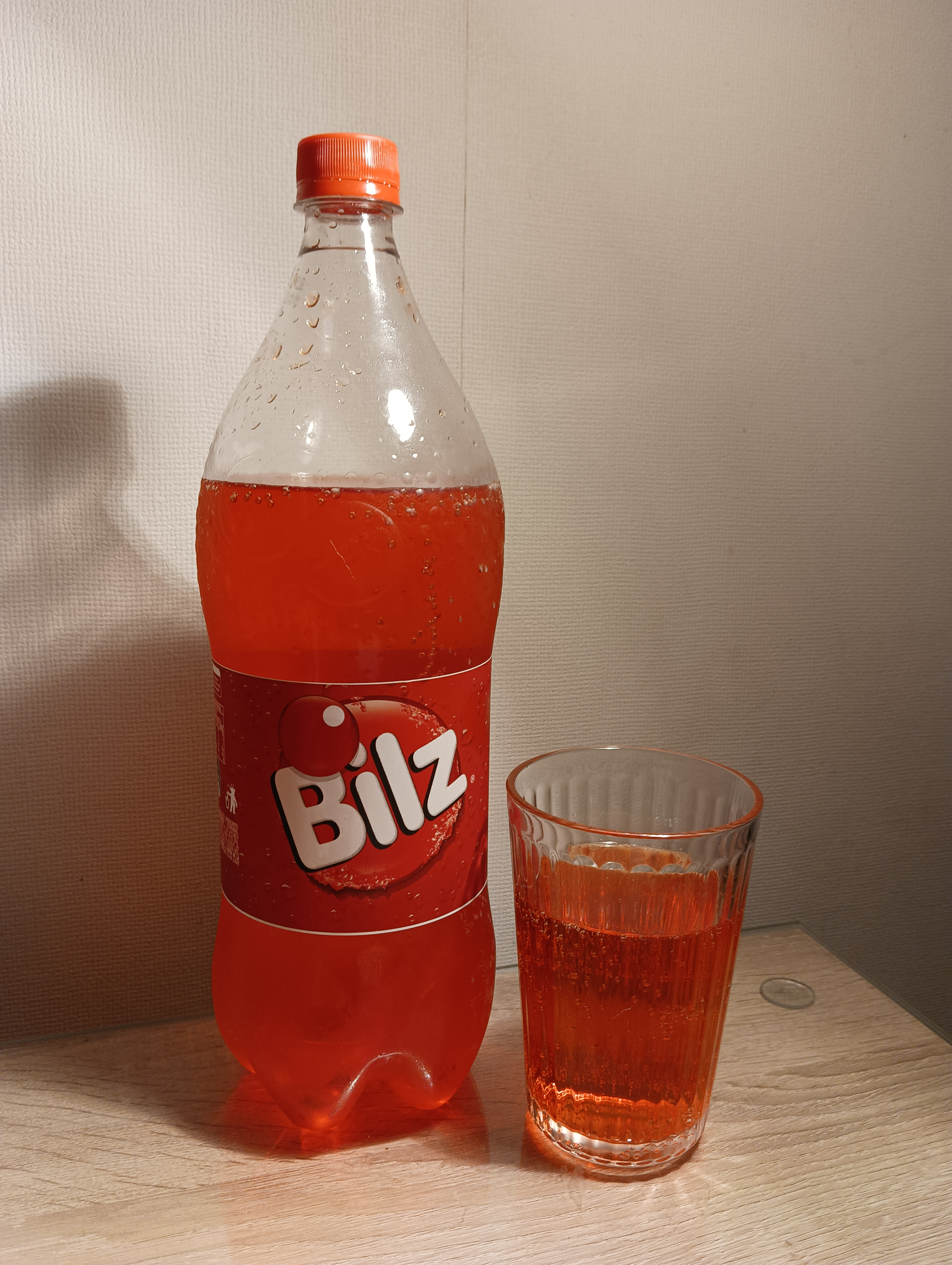
- Type: Soft drink
- Manufacturer: CCU
- Origin: Santiago, Chile
- Introduced: 1905; 121 years ago (Bilz); 1927; 99 years ago (Pap)
- Color: Red (Bilz); Yellow (Pap)
- Variants: Pop Morada; Pop Verde; Pop Celeste; Pop Candy; Pop Algodón de Azúcar; Pop Naranja
- Related products: Kem Piña; Pepsi
- Website: bilzypap.cl

Bilz y Pap (Spanish for Bilz and Pap) is a Chilean soda brand and the combined marketing name of the two most popular and highest selling domestically produced soft drinks created in Santiago. Bilz y Pap has 2 different colors, these colors being red and yellow. Bilz was first introduced in 1905, and Pap was introduced lately in 1927. It contains pop variants, like purple, green, sky blue, candy, cotton candy, and orange.

== Overview ==
Bilz was first introduced in Germany at the beginning of the 20th century when German scientist Friedrich Eduard Bilz created it and would later become Sinalco.

Although the names are often used in conjunction as part of their advertising strategy, Bilz and Pap are the marketing names of two distinct soda flavors produced by the Chilean Compañía de las Cervecerías Unidas, S.A. (CCU) beverage corporation. Bilz is an artificially flavored red colored fantasy soft drink, and Pap is its papaya flavored counterpart.

The corporation also produces a third flavor of pineapple soda, Kem. In recent years, CCU has also marketed zero-calorie diet versions of Bilz and Pap, better known as Bilz Light and Pap Light.

Bilz y Pap also refers to the extraterrestrial red and yellow characters, "Bily Bilz" and "Maik Pap", used in commercials, print advertising, and the Internet to promote soft drinks.

Recently, they have introduced an extra flavor to the market called "Pop", another three different soft drinks with artificial grape, cherry or cotton candy flavors.
