= Embroidered peppers =

Macedonian side dish

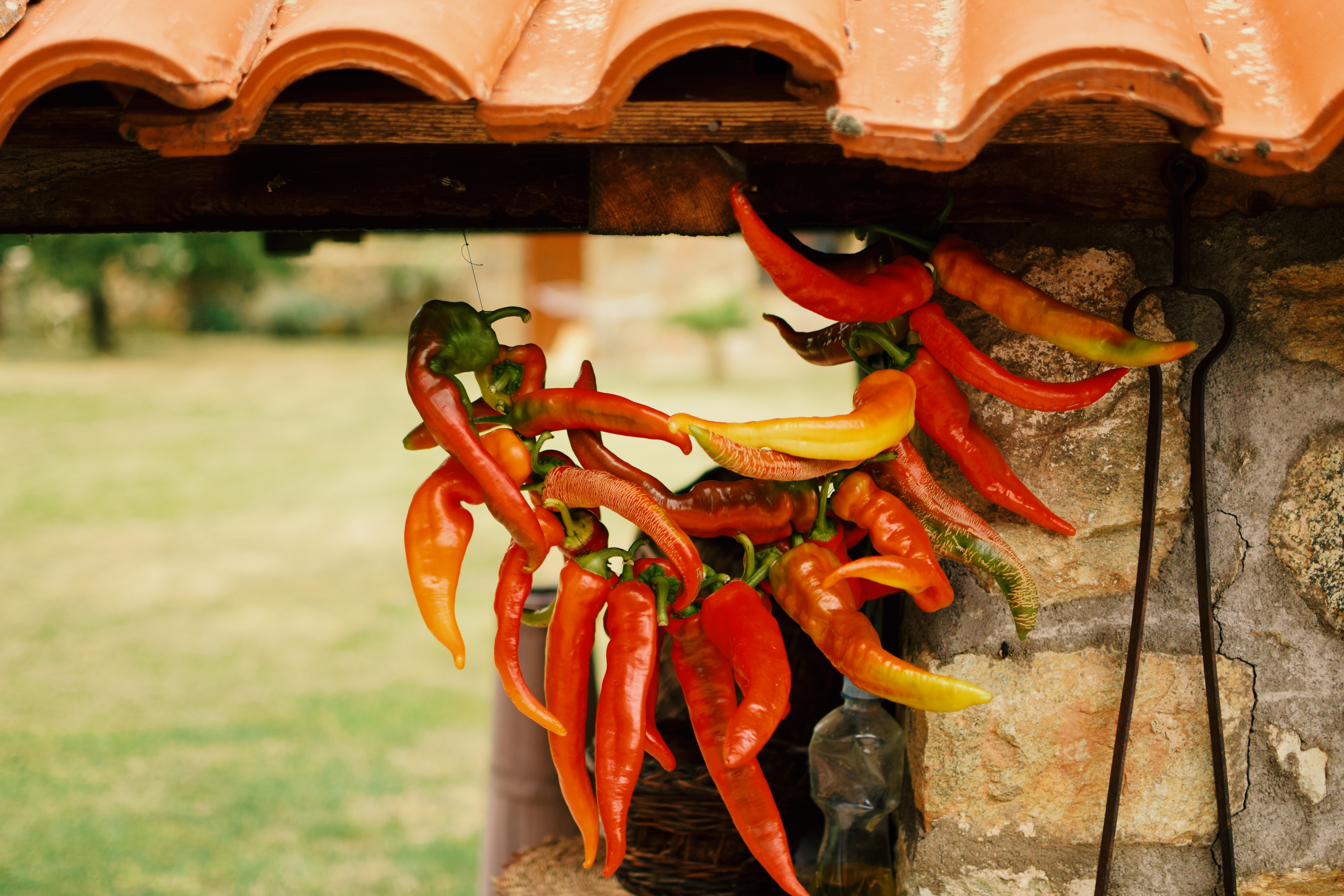
- Macedonian embroidered peppers
- Alternative names: Vezeni piperki
- Course: Meze, side dish
- Place of origin: North Macedonia
- Main ingredients: Peppers

Embroidered peppers (Macedonian: Везени пиперки, romanized: Vezeni piperki or Macedonian: Нарезнени пиперки, romanized: Narezneni piperki), also known as engraved peppers, is a traditional Macedonian meze made of fresh, dried or condimented peppers of the Capsicum annuum species threaded on a string.

== Background ==
Peppers are a staple ingredient of Macedonian cuisine. Capsicum annuum of the Capsicum species exist in several different landraces in North Macedonia and in neighbouring Kosovo, Albania and Serbia. Embroidered Macedonian peppers have a specific fruit appearance, taste and use and there are several different landraces. There are approximately 789 pepper samples, 204 of which are embroidered peppers.

== Method of preparation ==
Fruits of peppers are threaded together on strings and left on balconies or in attics to be dried. They are also found in urban areas of the country or are sold in local green markets. Bukovec, or Bukov piper, is a spice made from roughly crushed red peppers.

== See also ==
- Balkan cuisine
- Eastern European cuisine
