= Tavče gravče =

Traditional Macedonian dish

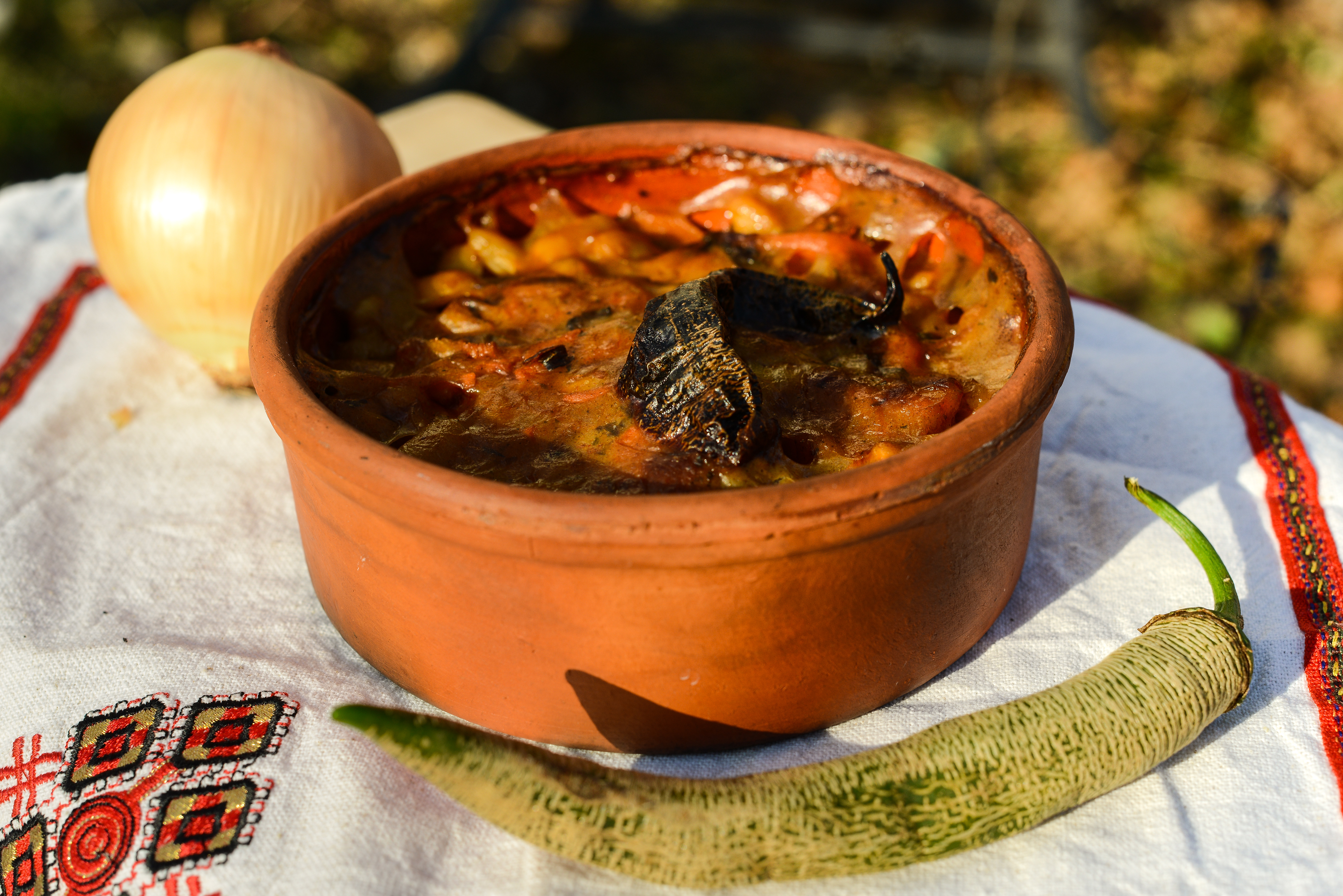
- Typical Macedonian tavče gravče
- Course: Main course
- Place of origin: North Macedonia
- Main ingredients: Beans

Tavče gravče (Macedonian: Тавче-гравче) is a traditional Macedonian dish. It is prepared with fresh beans and can be found in many restaurants in North Macedonia. It is also commonly eaten by the Macedonian diaspora. This meal is baked and served in a traditional unglazed earthenware pot. The name of the dish may be translated as "beans on a tava". Tavče gravče is considered the national dish of North Macedonia. "Tavče gravče Tetovo style" is a popular regional variation.

== Ingredients ==
The basic ingredients in tavče gravče are:

- butter beans
- onion
- oil
- dry red pepper
- red and black pepper
- salt
- parsley

== Preparation ==
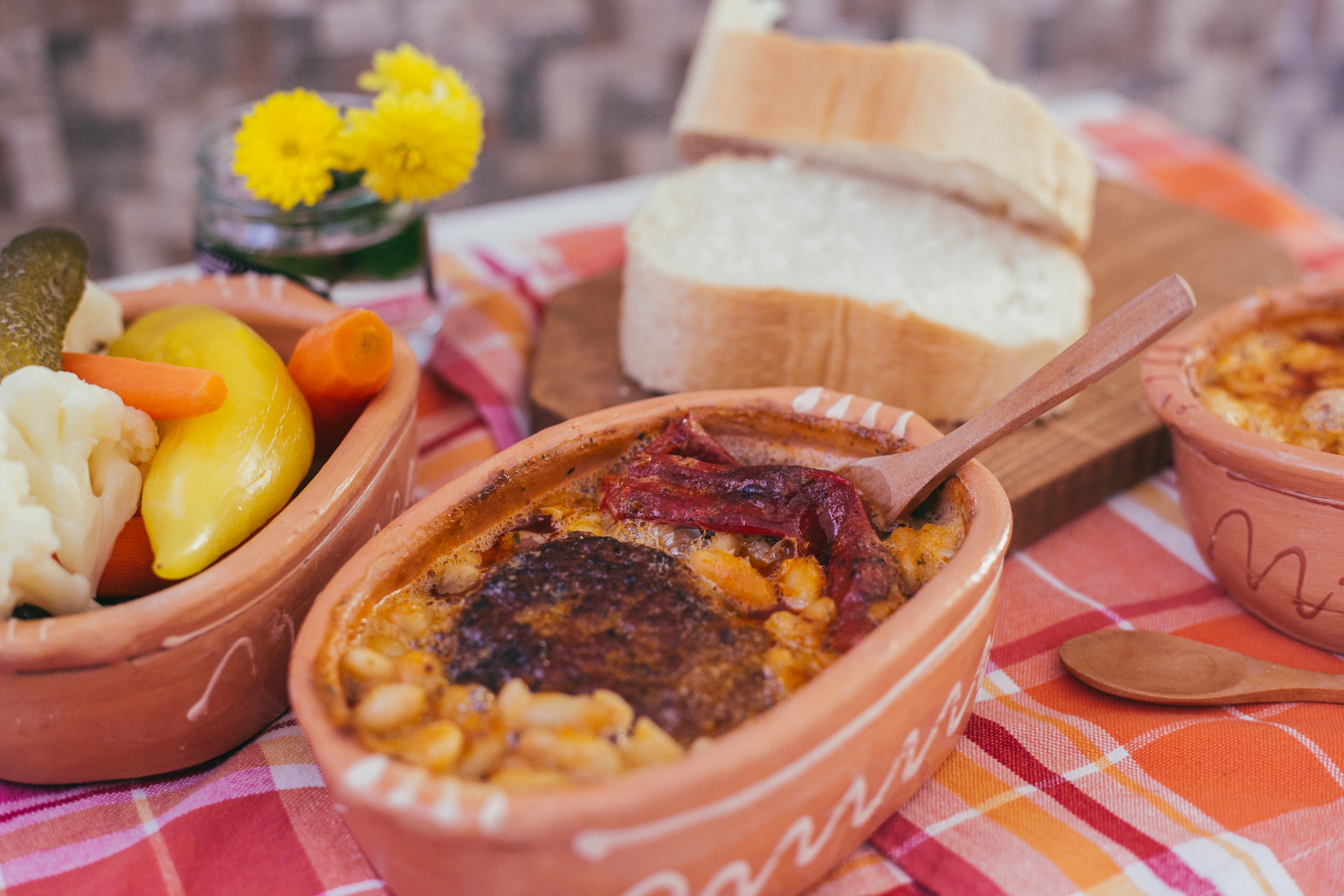
Tavče gravče served with kofta and torshi

The beans are cleaned and then soaked in cold water – preferably overnight, but, if time is an issue, they may be soaked for several hours or until the beans have become soft. The water in which the beans have been soaked must be discarded and fresh water added, before the beans are brought slowly to the boil and then simmered in a covered pot on a very low flame for one hour. After the first boiling, the water is again discarded, the beans washed and yet more fresh water added before they are boiled for a second time. This changing of the water at several points in the cooking process makes the beans more digestible by leaching out of them some of the indigestible sugars that can often cause flatulence. A whole onion is then added to the boiling water with the beans. When the beans are boiled, the boiled onion is removed from the water, fried separately with a scoop of flour and a teaspoon of ground red paprika, and then returned to the boiled beans. Salt, black pepper, and/or the ubiquitous regional seasoning salt Vegeta may be added to the soup. Some cooks may also add dried meats such as smoked pork, bacon or suho meso to the mix. When the beans are boiled and when all the ingredients have been added, they are put in an earthenware pot covered with a lid and baked in an oven at 220 °C. During the baking, the beans must be checked carefully from time to time to ensure that they do not become dry.

The traditional earthenware pot not only gives the dish a pleasingly rustic appearance when it is served, piping hot, from the oven, but also keeps it hot and, if used regularly and kept in good condition, can even impart a special flavour to the dish – in much the same way that the traditional unglazed earthenware cazuela can do.

== See also ==
- List of legume dishes
