= Friedrich Eduard Bilz =

German naturopath (1842–1922)

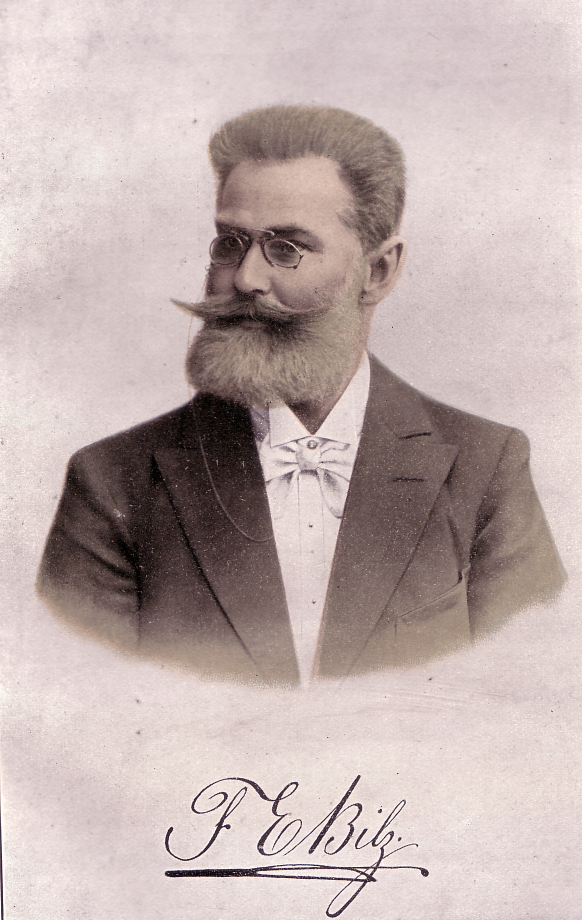
Friedrich Eduard Bilz

Friedrich Eduard Bilz (June 12, 1842 – January 30, 1922) was a German naturopath who was a native of Arnsdorf in the Kingdom of Saxony.

As a merchant of a Kolonialwarenladen (shop offering non-European goods) in Meerane, Bilz became interested in naturopathic medicine. In 1888 he published Das Neue Naturheilverfahren (The New Natural Healing), a book that became very popular and was translated into twelve languages.

In 1895 Bilz founded a health spa at Radebeul that was soon expanded into a large sanitarium. In the early part of the 20th century, he constructed a Licht-Luft Bad (a large outdoor swimming pool) at the sanitarium (the "Bilzbad"). In 1911 he displayed a Wellenmaschine (wave machine) at the International Hygiene Exhibition in Dresden. It was installed at Bilzbad during the following year.

In 1902, Bilz created a soft-drink named Bilz-Brause, a beverage consisting of mineral water and citrus juice that was served to patients at the sanitarium. After forming a partnership with local industrialist Franz Hartmann, the name was changed to Sinalco, and the drink was marketed worldwide.
