= Balkan cuisine =

Regional cuisine

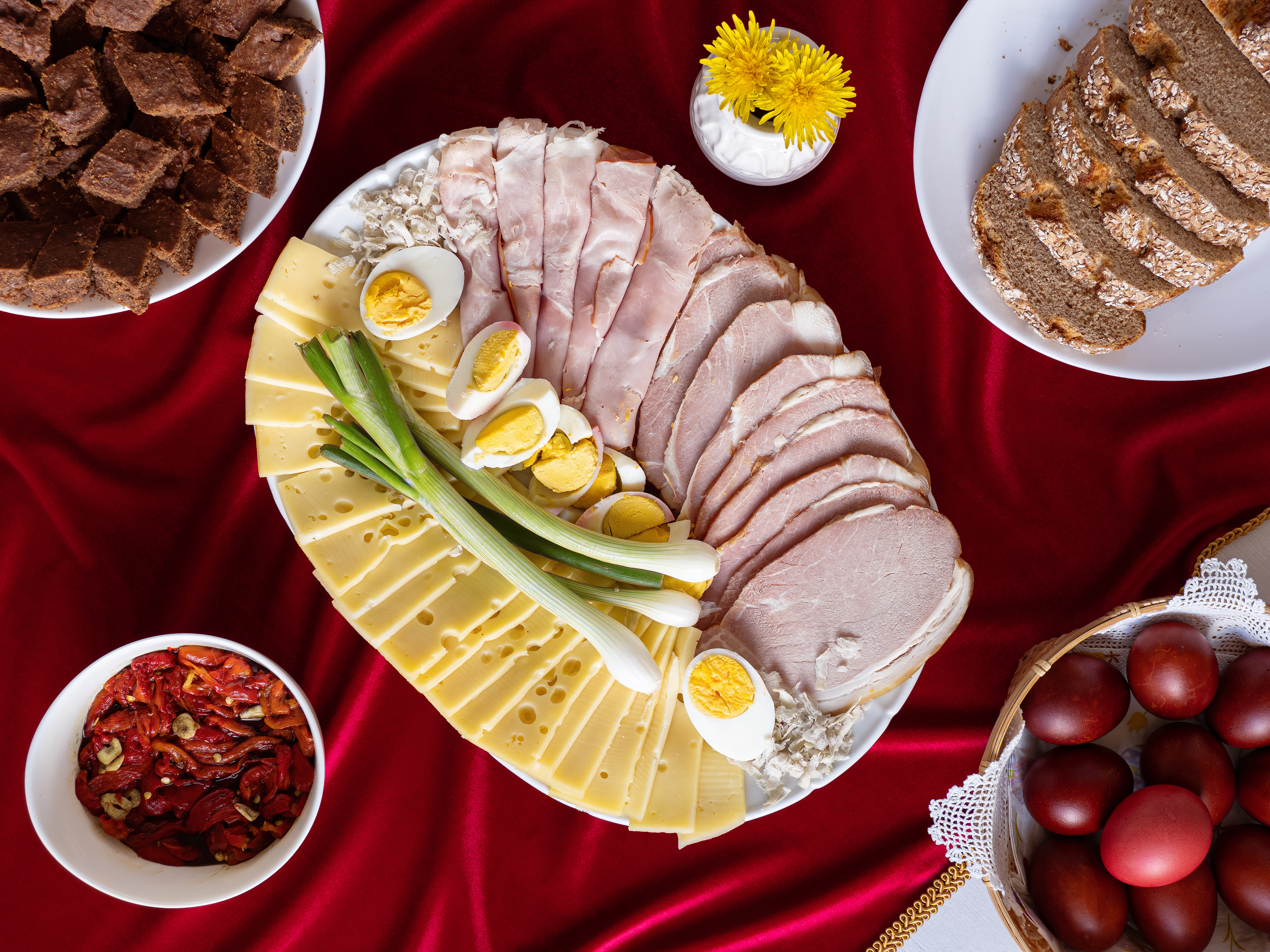
Easter breakfast is popular in Bosnia and Herzegovina, Bulgaria, Moldova, Montenegro, North Macedonia, Romania and Serbia for Orthodox Easter. A similar Easter breakfast is popular in Croatia, Hungary and Slovenia.

Balkan cuisine encompasses the various cuisines of the Balkans region in Europe. It is most notably characterised by a mixture of local and Turkish- or West Asian-origin culinary traditions. In its broadest sense, Balkan cuisine encompasses the native cuisines of Albania, Bosnia and Herzegovina, Bulgaria, Croatia, Greece, Hungary, Moldova, Montenegro, North Macedonia, Romania, Serbia and Slovenia. Except for Slovenian cuisine, these cuisines have a significant Turkish influence due to Ottoman occupation. Except for Hungarian, Moldovan, and Romanian cuisine, Balkan cuisines have considerable Mediterranean influence, mostly present in Greek and Albanian cuisine. Notably, Balkan cuisine also encompasses the culinary traditions of Romani and Turks in the region.

Balkan cuisine is available in Vienna, Austria, due to post-WWII migration to the city. Germany has restaurants serving Balkan cuisine, which were often called Yugoslavian restaurants until the outbreak of the Yugoslav Wars. Balkan Grills have been present in West Germany since the 1960s, popularizing ćevapčići in the country, but these establishments have become rarer since the late 1980s, and those that survive are often now called "Croatian" instead. The culinary traditions of the broader Romani diaspora may include dishes or influences from traditional Balkan cuisine.

== History ==
The Balkans have a history of foreign rule and internal power struggles, resulting in a diverse cuisine shaped by cultural exchange. The historical foundation of modern Balkan cuisine is Ottoman cuisine, which itself was heavily influenced by Arabian Levantine cuisine and the medieval Byzantine cuisine. The Ottoman Empire introduced peppers to the region and also brought börek, a filo pastry whose origins may trace back to Ancient Roman cuisine. During the Ottoman presence, dishes such as ćevapi and pljeskavica were introduced along with Turkish coffee. At the same time, pork became popular in northern Serbia as pigs were not taxed under Ottoman Islamic law.

Balkan cuisine also draws on the traditional cuisines of Greece, Persia, the Arab countries, and Turkey, and the region itself, and has borrowed from Mediterranean cuisine, Armenian cuisine, and the cuisines of Northwest Africa and Central Europe. Commonalities also appear in German and Slavic cuisines. Austria and Italy's involvement in the Balkans introduced breaded-meat dishes and an emphasis on seafood. Persian cuisine influenced the use of yoghurt in meat dishes. Jewish cuisine also contributed, such as patišpanja, a sponge cake found in Bosnia and Herzegovina.

== Characteristics ==
Balkan cuisine is characterised by diverse, strong, and sometimes spicy food. Pickled vegetables are common ingredients. Peppers appear in ajvar spread, and small hot peppers are also common. Feta cheese is a popular ingredient in southern parts of the region. Dishes often use stuffed vegetables, such as sarma, made with stuffed vine leaves. Moussaka, a dish made from eggplants or potatoes, is also popular. Dishes may be served with a thick cream known as kajmak, and egg-and-lemon sauce avgolemono, is widely used. Meze are often served as appetizers, similar to the Levantine and Caucasian cuisines. Popular desserts include baklava and halva, and people often drink fruit brandy rakia. Cooking is typically done using a sač, a type of baking lid covered with hot coals or ashes, a technique dating back to Ancient Greek cuisine.

== Diversity ==
The similarities within Balkan cuisine partly stem from the Balkans' shared natural environment, which provides similar ingredients. Many dishes and recipes across the region use similar terms, albeit with national variations. The common features of Balkan cuisine are most evident in haute cuisine. In contrast, meals prepared domestically reveal the cuisine's geographic variation, including a series of intermediate cuisines ranging from Northern and Mediterranean Europe to the Middle East. Different nationalities in the region create their own variations, and a dish by the same name may have different ingredients and preparation methods in different countries. Chocolate, cakes, and sweet confections are popular in the northern Balkans, but in the south, seafood, honeyed sweets, and pastas reflect the region's more Mediterranean style.

== See also ==
- Albanian cuisine
  - Cham cuisine
- Aromanian cuisine
- Bosnia and Herzegovina cuisine
- Bulgarian cuisine
- Croatian cuisine
- Cypriot cuisine
- Greek cuisine
  - Cretan cuisine
  - Epirotic cuisine
  - Macedonian cuisine
  - Heptanesean cuisine
- Kosovan cuisine
- Hungarian cuisine
- Macedonian cuisine
- Moldovan cuisine
- Montenegrin cuisine
- Romani cuisine
- Romanian cuisine
- Serbian cuisine
- Slovenian cuisine
- Turkish cuisine
  - Ottoman cuisine
