= Sinalco =

Brand of non-alcoholic drinks

- Type: Soft drink Non-alcoholic drink
- Origin: Detmold, Germany
- Introduced: 1902; 124 years ago
- Website: www.sinalco.com

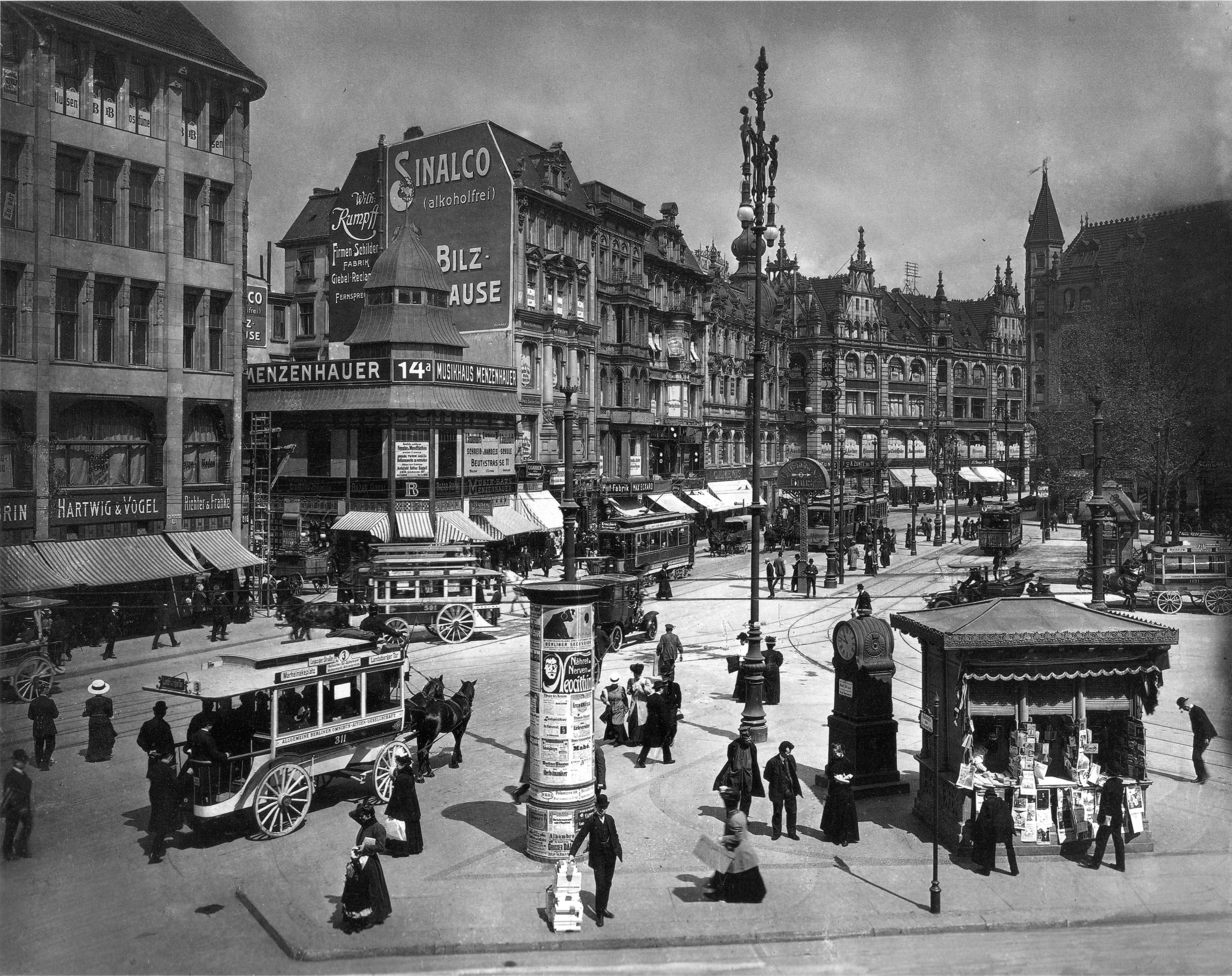
Sinalco advertising on wall of a building in Berlin, 1909

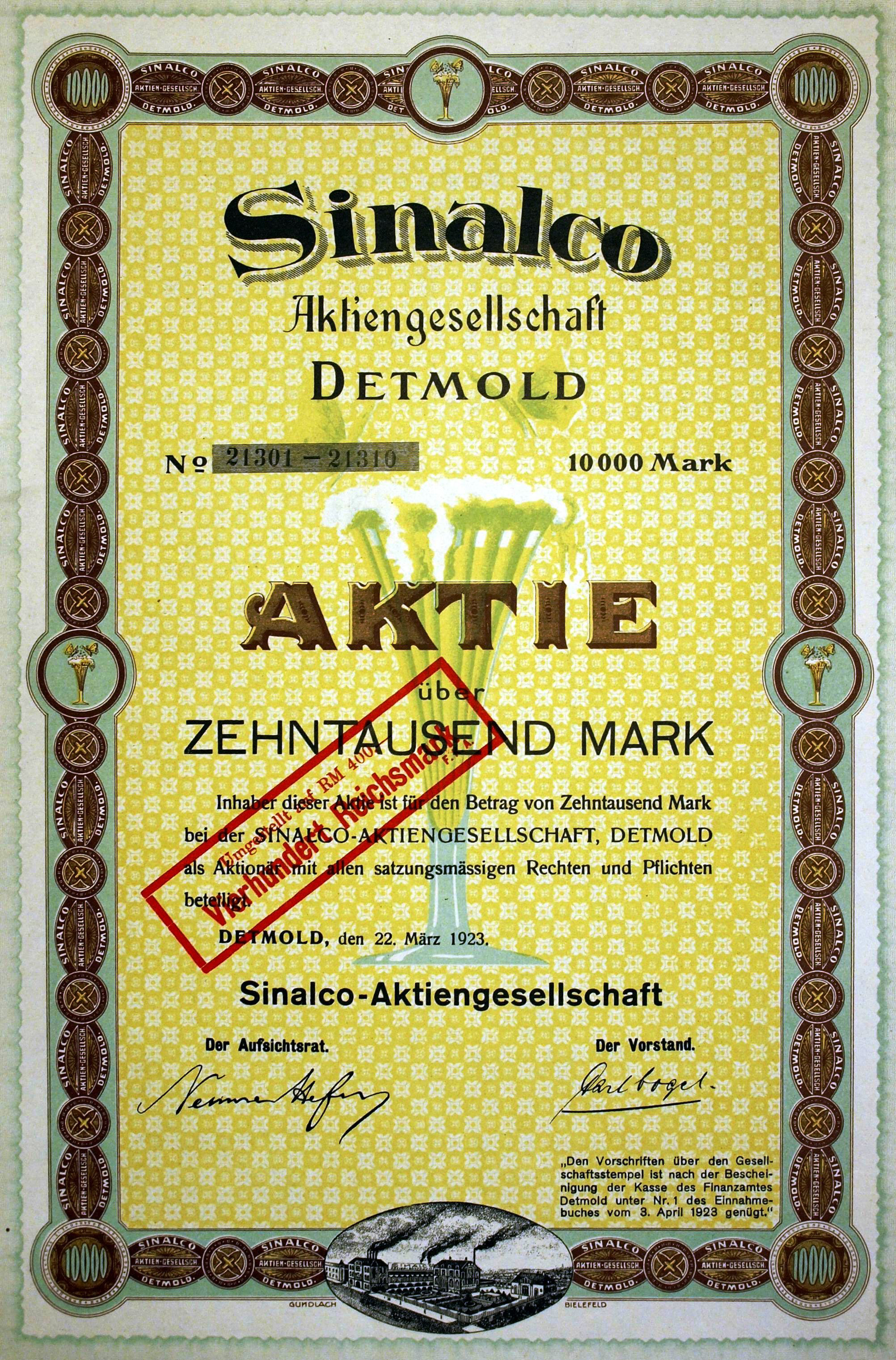
Share of the Sinalco AG, issued 22. March 1923

Sinalco is a German brand of non-alcoholic drinks first marketed in 1902, with sales in now more than 40 countries. Sinalco is claimed to be the oldest soft drink brand of European origin. It is produced by Sinalco International, a company headquartered in Detmold, Germany.

In 1902, German scientist Friedrich Eduard Bilz invented "Bilz Brause", a sherbet powder, and started to sell it in partnership with industrialist Franz Hartmann. As imitations started to appear, they held a prize competition for a brand name, and chose "Sinalco" (an abbreviation of the Latin sine alcohole, "without alcohol"). As one of the first beverage brands, Sinalco came to be exported worldwide, particularly to South America and the Middle East. The red circle trademark was registered in 1937. A distinctively-shaped bottle was launched in the 1950s, and updated at the end of the century. Besides the original Sinalco Orange, today the company also bottles Sinalco Cola and a few other kinds of soft drinks. As of 2009, Sinalco was the third most popular lemonade brand in Germany, after Fanta and Sprite.

In Slovenia Sinalco soft drinks are produced by food tech company Dana, licensed by Sinalco International GmbH & Co.

== Products ==
Sinalco's basic line of products includes:

- Sinalco Cola (light; without sugar; without sugar + lemon; without sugar + cherry)
- Sinalco Cola Mix
- Sinalco Orange (without sugar)
- Sinalco Zitron (without sugar)
- Sinalco Orange Passion Fruit
- Sinalco Bitter Lemon
- Sinalco Lemon Lime
- Sinalco Cloudy Lemon
- Sinalco Special
- Sinalco Apple
- Sinalco Rosso (Blood Orange and Passion fruit)
- Sinalco Fresco (Lemon and Elderberry)
- Sinalco Caribico
- Sinalco iced tea Peach
- Sinalco iced tea Lemon

In addition, Sinalco bottles energy drinks, teas, water and much more.
