= List of Greek Protected Designations of Origin cheeses =

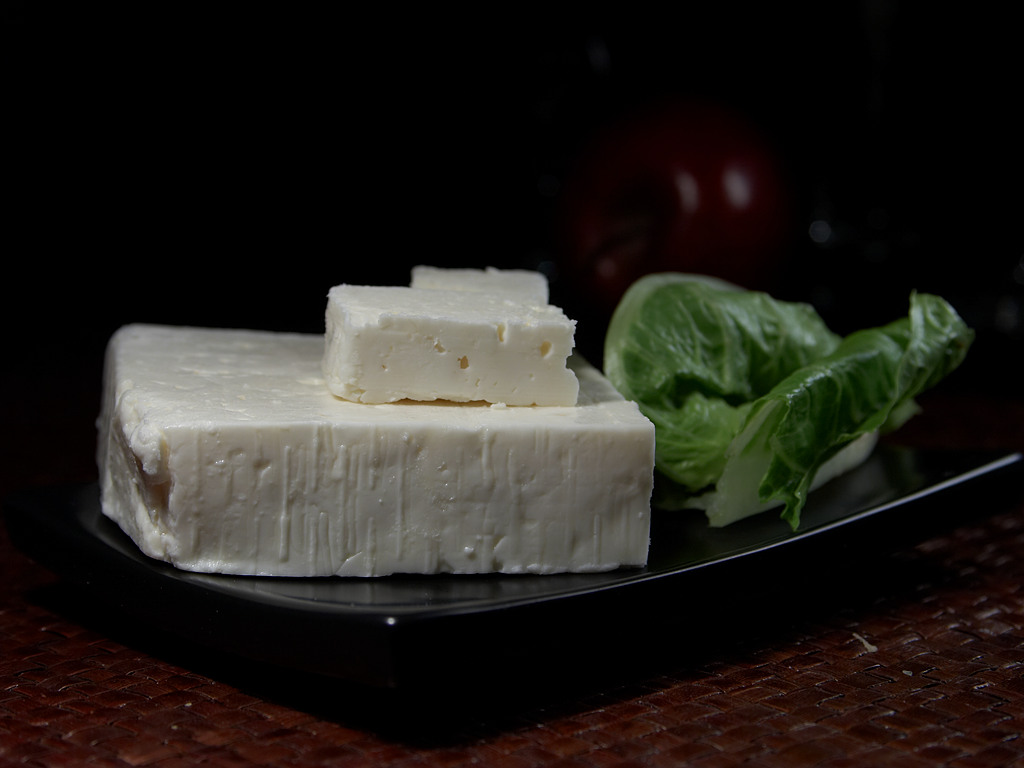
Feta, the most popular of Greek cheeses is registered as a PDO since 2002

In 1996, 19 cheeses from Greece were registered as Protected Designation of Origin (PDO) in the EU defining their areas of origin and methods of production. Feta received the same status in 2002, Xygalo Sitias in 2008 and Tsalafouti in 2023. The designated cheeses are made from fresh milk by traditional methods. They contain predominantly sheep or sheep and goat's milk.

The use of cow's milk is not traditional in Greece as the nature of much of the terrain favours the farming of sheep and goats. Such cow's milk as is produced is mainly destined for drinking or the production of processed cheese. The Greek cheeses containing cow's milk that have PDO status are 3 Graviera cheeses, San Michali and Metsovone (which also contains sheep's milk).

The cheeses with PDO registration are protected in the EU and the UK. Through bilateral agreements, the PDO registration of the EU some cheeses are also recognized in other countries.

== Cow's milk cheeses ==
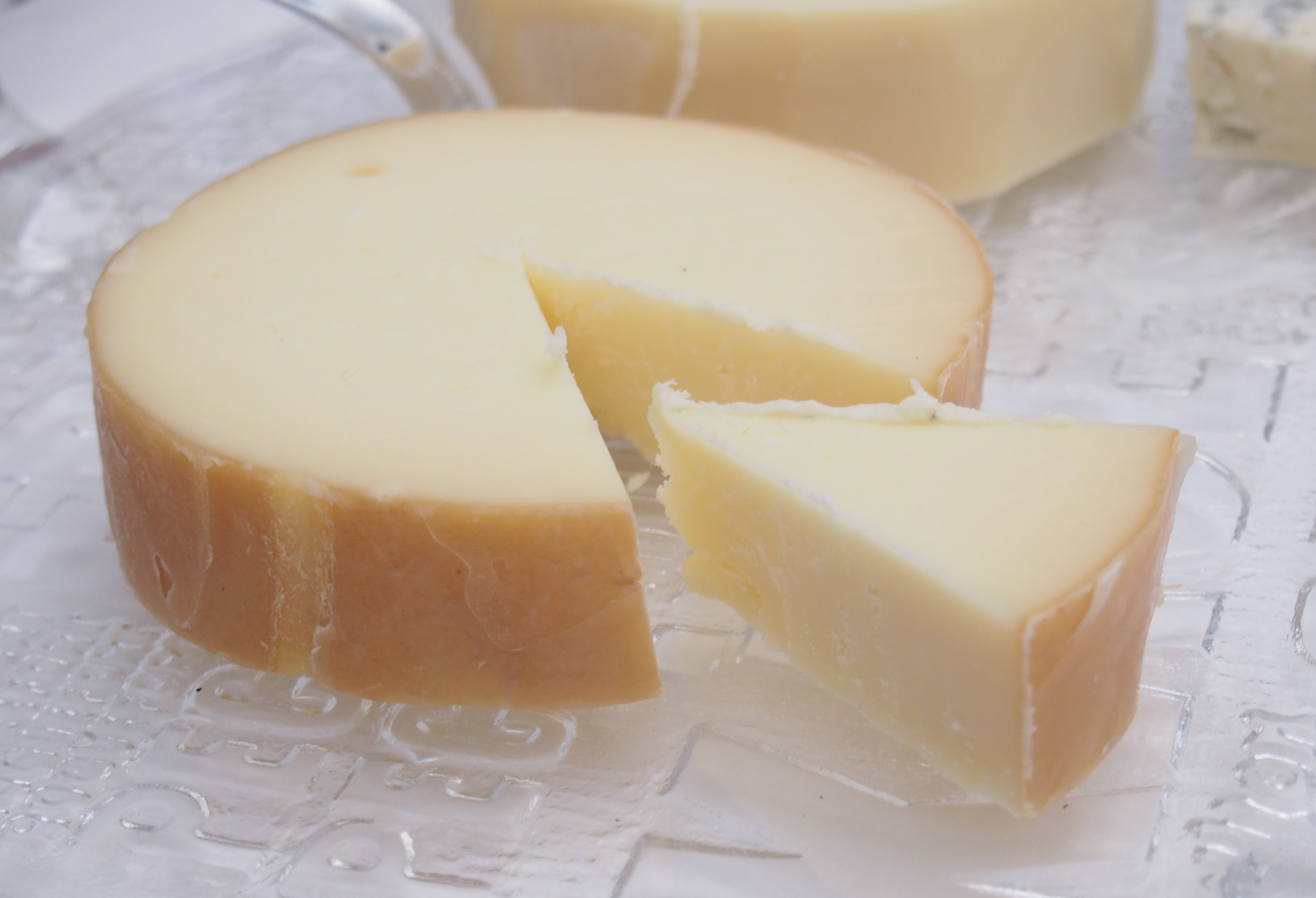
Metsovone

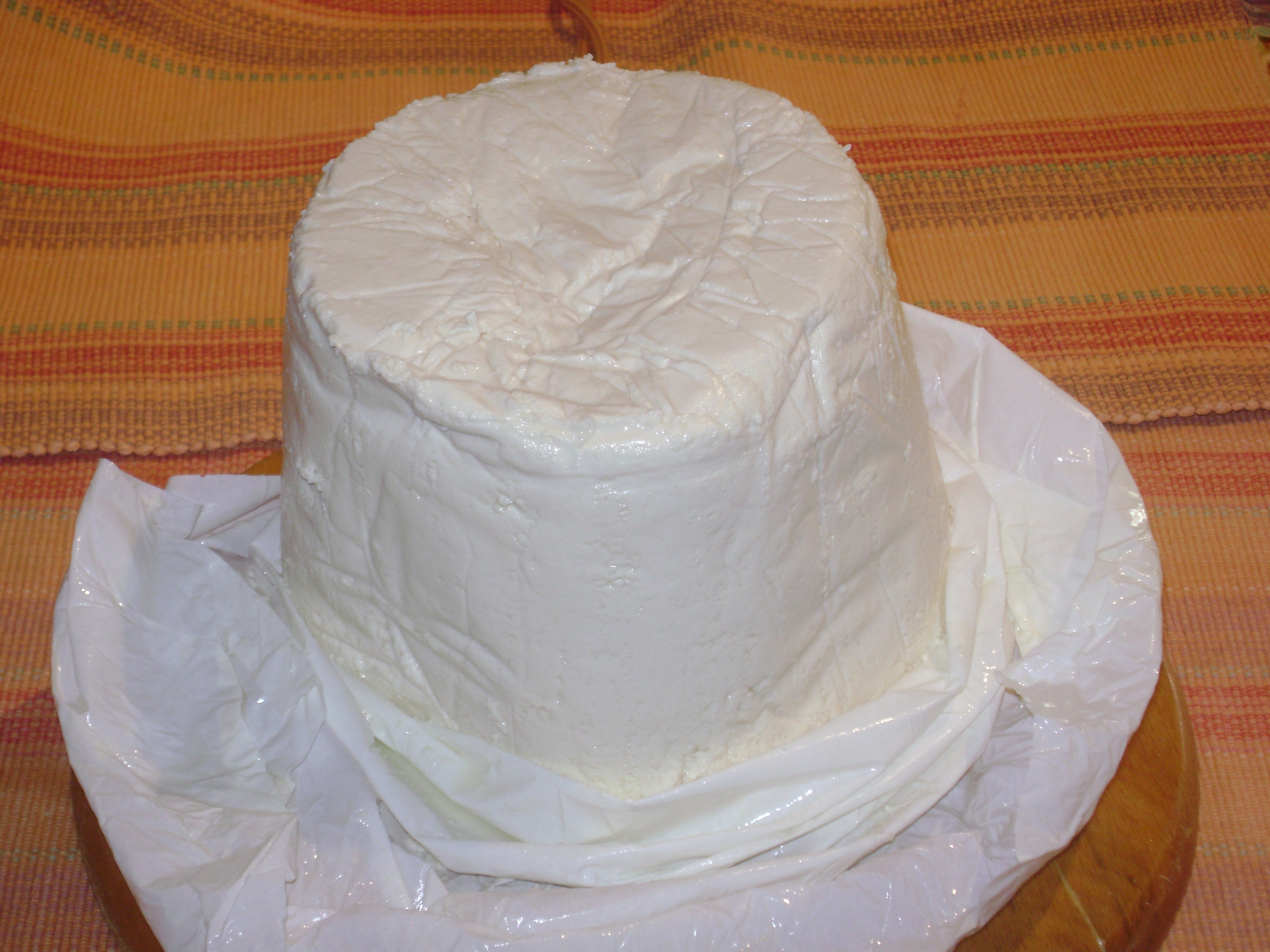
Anthotyros

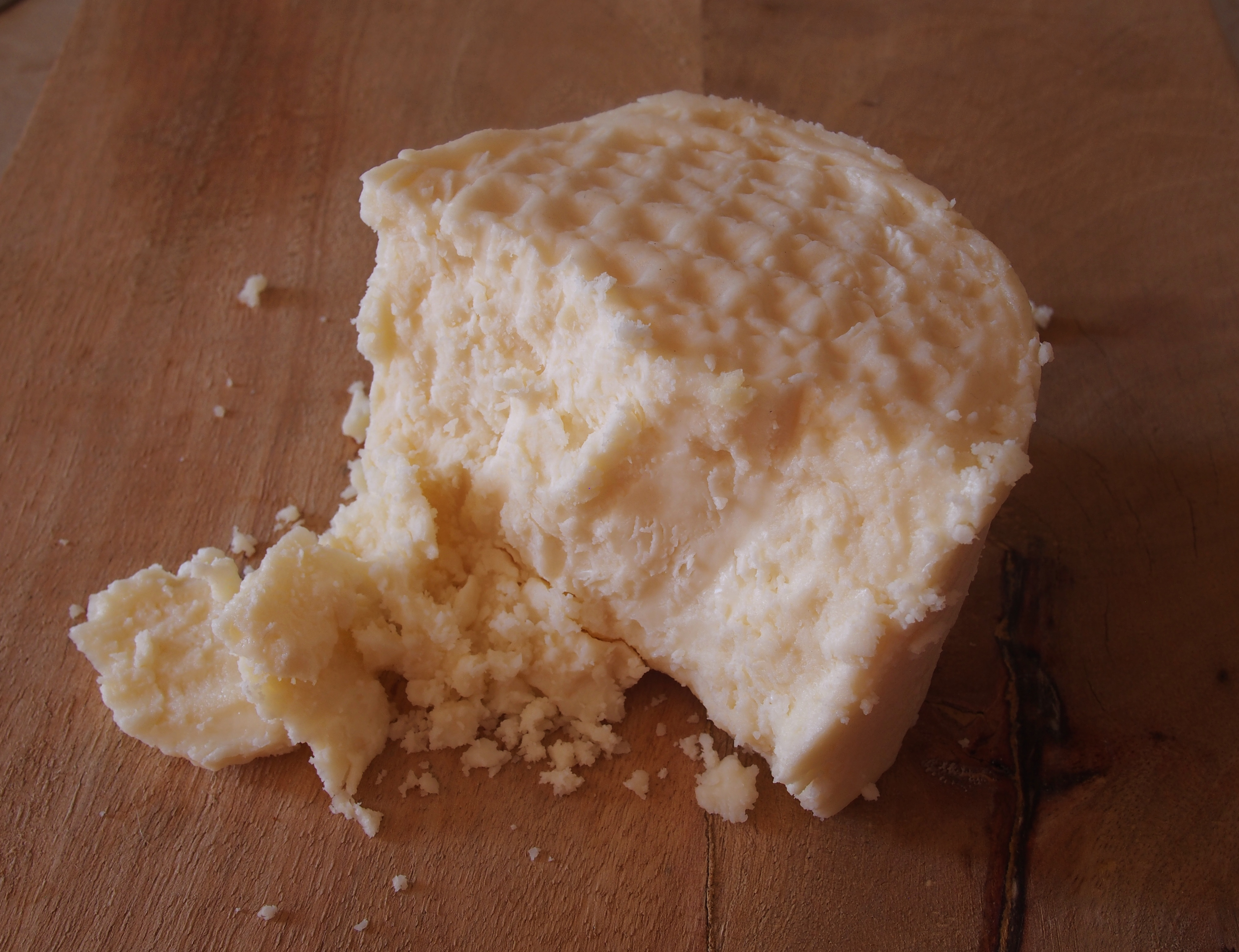
Kopanisti

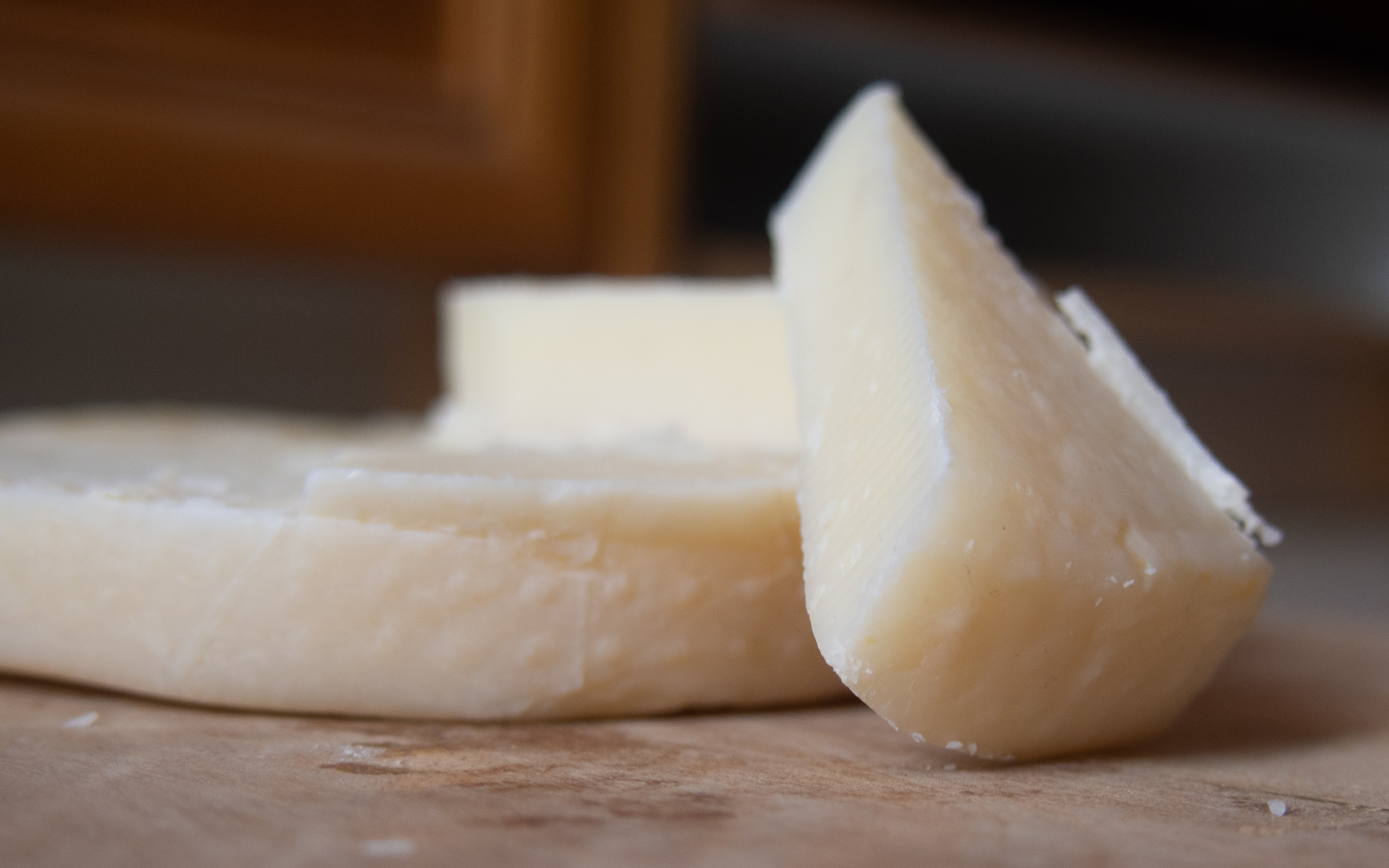
Ladotyri Mytilinis

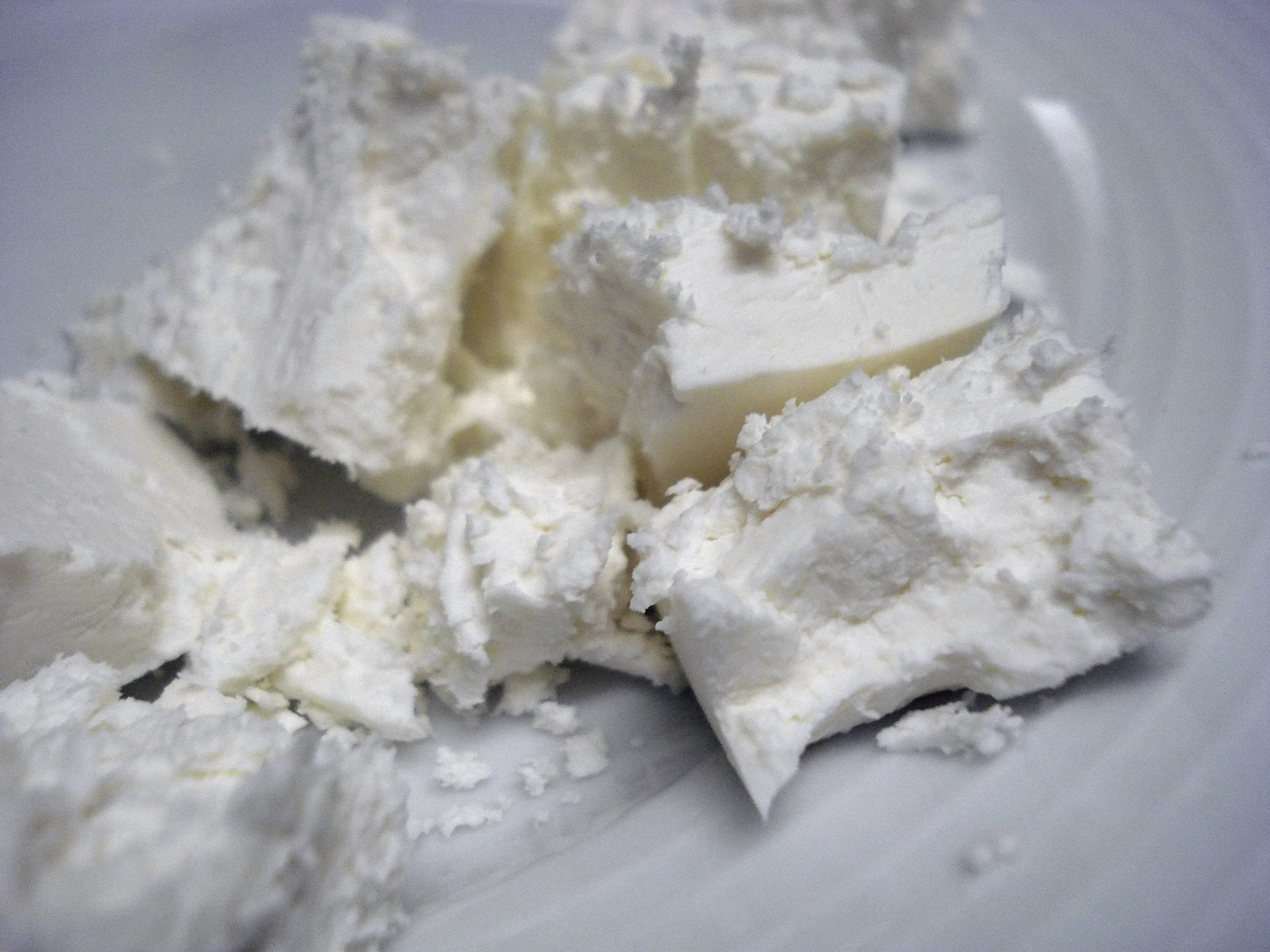
Manouri

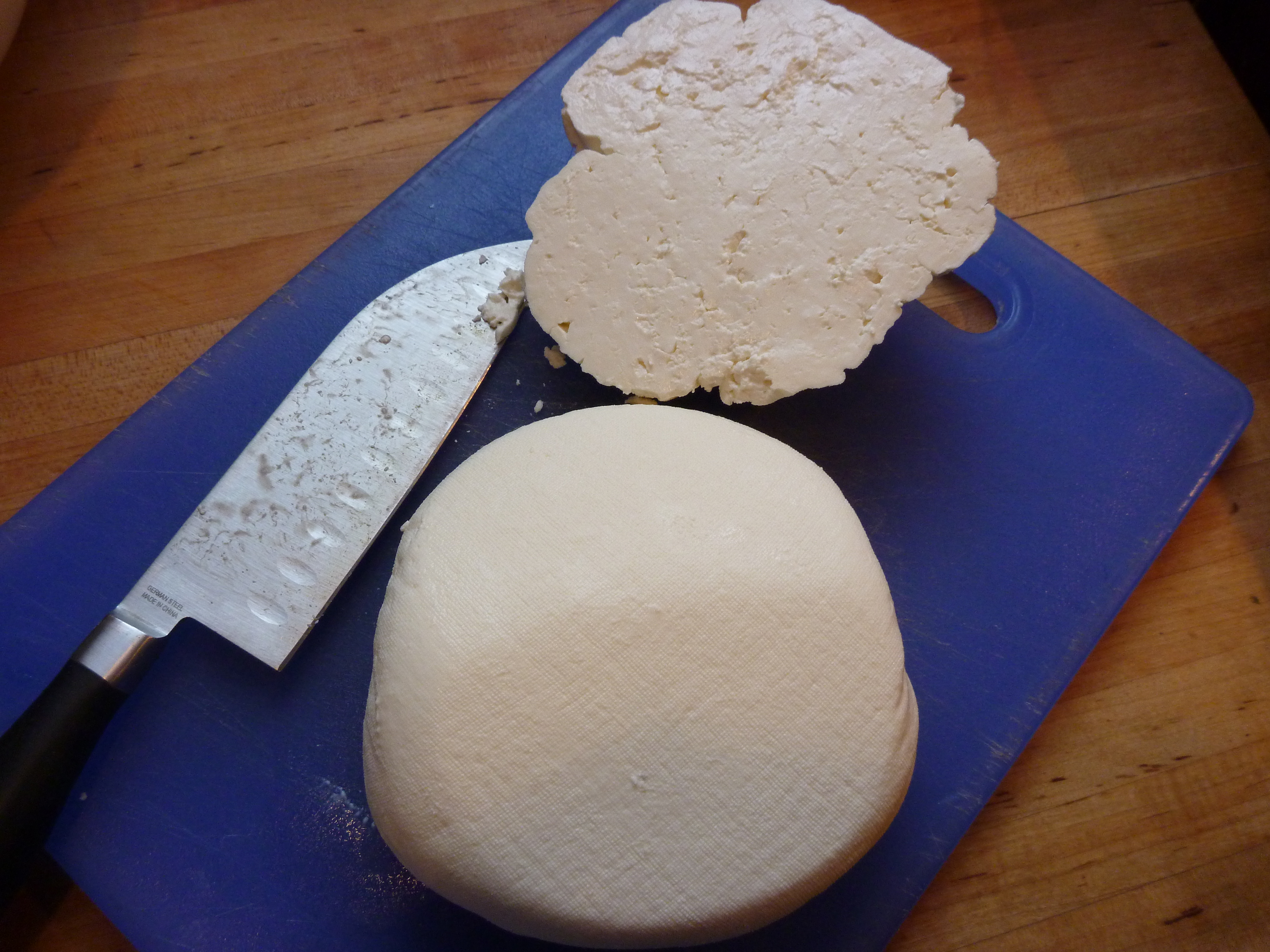
Mizithra

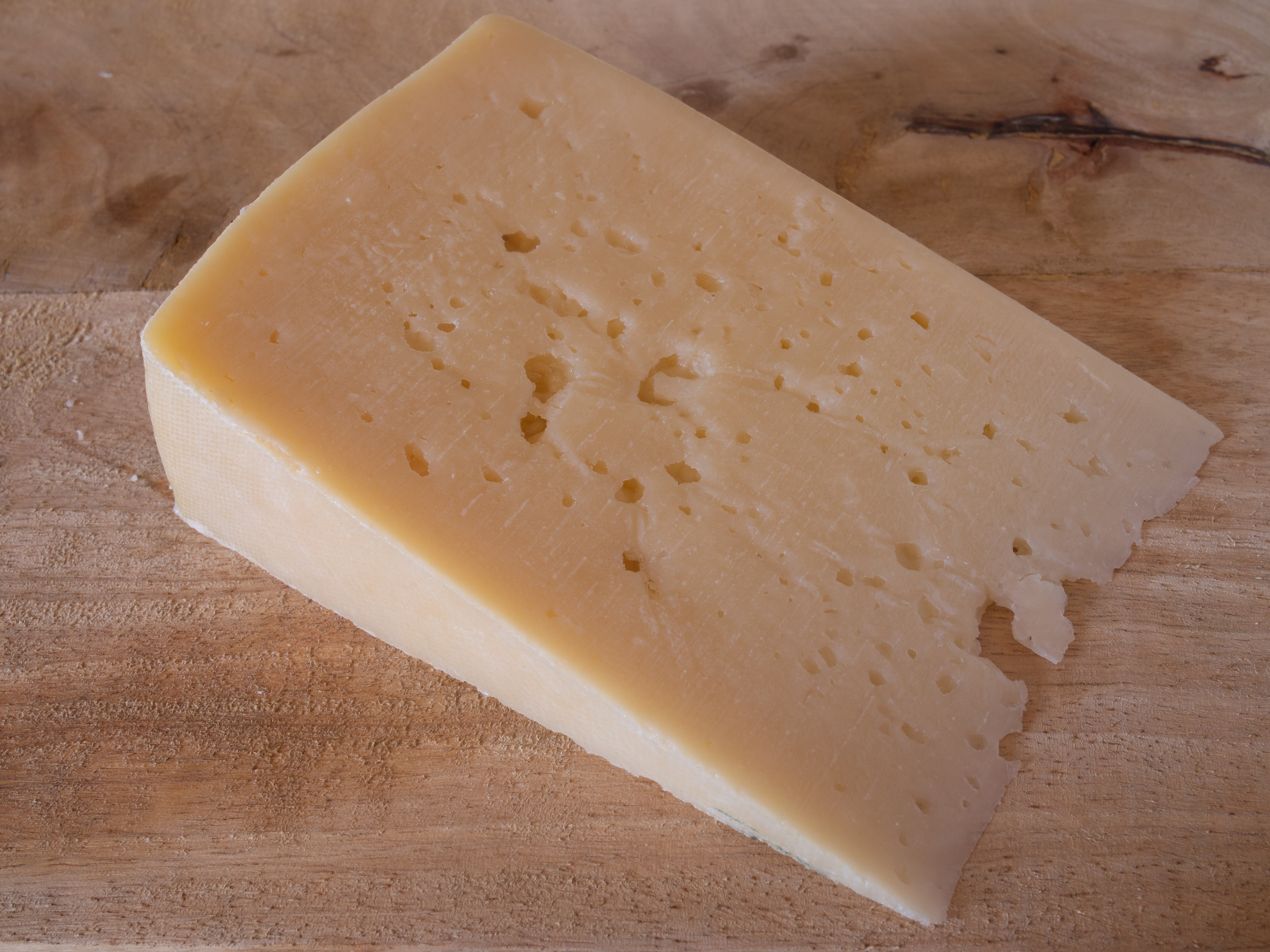
San Michali

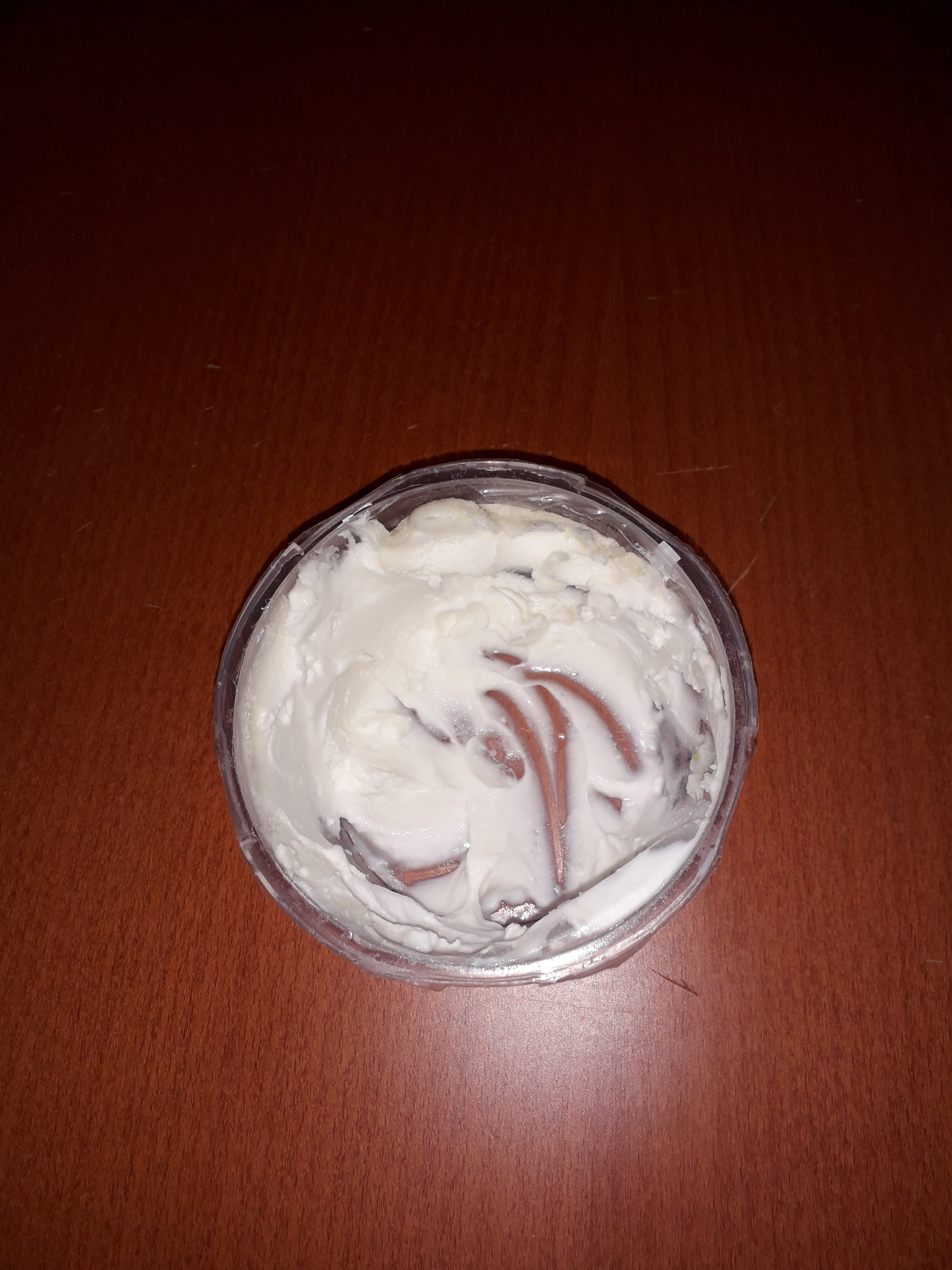
Anevató

- Graviera Naxou (Γραβιέρα Νάξου) from Naxos island, South Aegean (may contain up to 20% sheep's or goats' milk)

== Sheep's milk cheeses ==
- Graviera Agrafon / Γραβιέρα Αγράφων (may contain some goat's milk)
- Graviera Kritis / Γραβιέρα Κρήτης (may include some goat's milk)
- Formaela Arachovas Parnassou (Φορμαέλλα Αράχωβας
- Kalathaki Limnou (Καλαθάκι Λήμνου), a brine cheese produced on the island of Limnos, North Aegean
- Kasseri (Κασέρι)
- Tsalafouti / Τσαλαφούτι (may include some goat's milk)

== Mixed milk cheeses ==
=== Cow/Sheep ===
- Metsovone / Μετσοβόνε), a semi-hard smoked cheese produced in Metsovo, Epirus
- San Michali / Σαν Μιχάλη

=== Sheep/Goat ===
- Anevato / Ανεβατό, a spreadable, creamy cheese
- Batzos / Μπάτζος, a salty, semi-hard to hard cheese which matures and is preserved in brine; from Macedonia
- Feta / Φέτα, the most popular of Greek cheeses
- Galotyri / Γαλοτύρι, a soft, creamy cheese produced in Epirus and Thessaly
- Katiki Domokou / Κατίκι Δομοκού, a spreadable, moist, slightly spicy white cheese; from Domokos, Thessaly
- Kefalograviera / Κεφαλογραβιέρα
- Kopanisti / Κοπανιστή, a pink, spicy cheese that owes its hotness to fungal growth; from Mykonos island and the surrounding Cyclades
- Ladotyri Mytilinis / Λαδοτύρι Μυτιλήνης, a sharp, salty cheese that matures immersed in jars of olive oil; from Mytilini Island
- Manouri /Μανούρι, a semi-soft fresh whey cheese
- Pichtogalo Chanion / Πηχτόγαλο Χανίων, a white table cheese produced in the Chania Regional Unit, Crete
- Sfela / Σφέλα, also referred to as "Fire Feta", a mildly spicy soft white cheese from Messenia, Peloponnese
- Xygalo Siteias / Ξύγαλο Σητείας, a soft cheese produced in the easternmost portion of the island of Crete
- Ξυνομυζήθρα Κρήτης / Xynomyzithra Kritis

== Goat's milk cheese ==
There are several types of cheese made solely from goat's milk in Greece, but no applications have been submitted for PDO status.

== See also ==
- Cuisine of Greece

== Sources ==
- Donnelly, Catherine, ed. (25 October 2016). The Oxford Companion to Cheese. Oxford University Press. ISBN 978-0-19-933090-4.
