= Epirotic cuisine =

Culinary tradition

Epirotic cuisine (Greek: Ηπειρώτικη κουζίνα, or Κουζίνα της Ηπείρου) is the traditional Greek cuisine of the region of Epirus. It is based mostly on dairy products; butter and various cheeses.

== Appetizers and cheeses ==
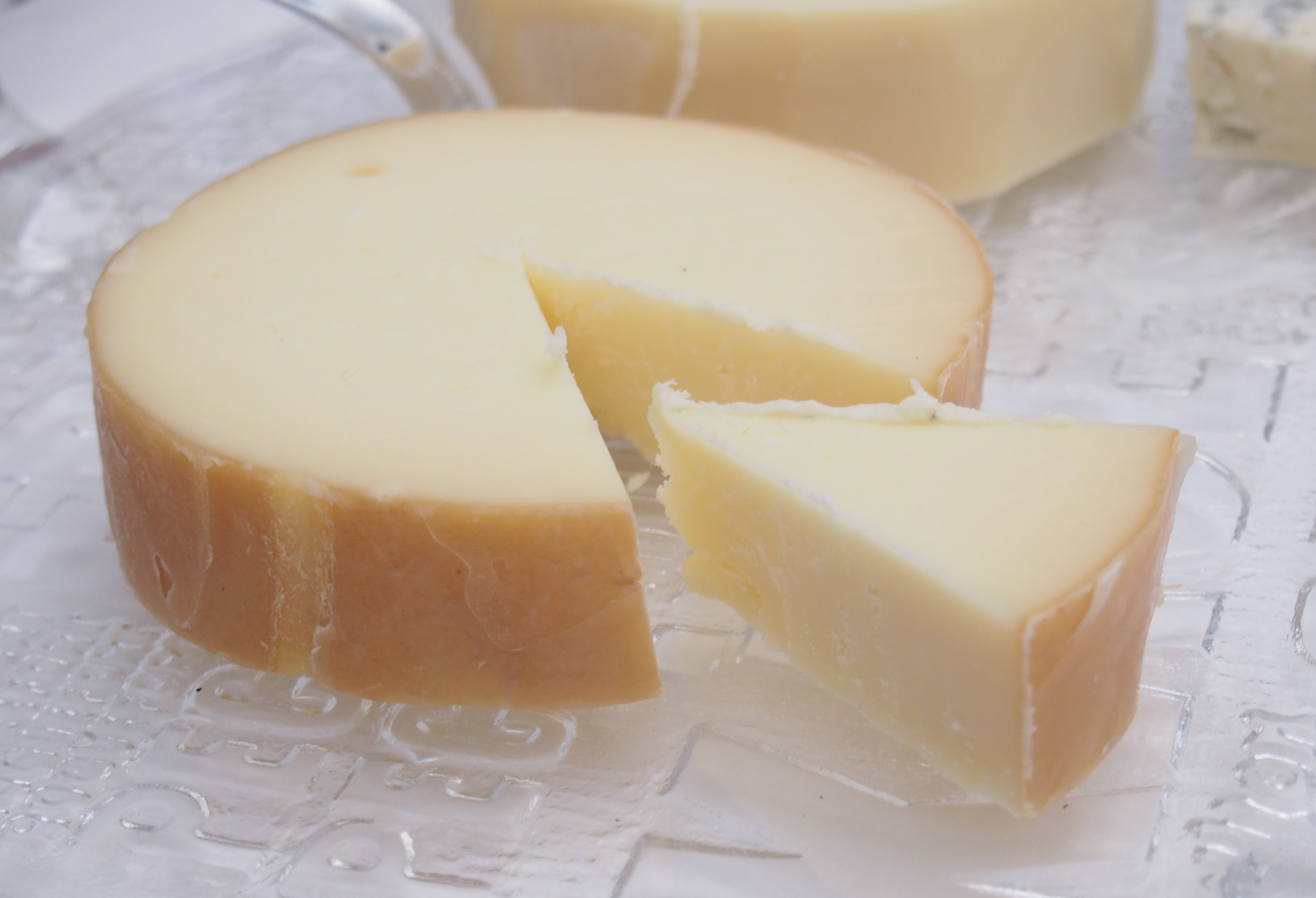
Metsovone cheese

- Anthotyros
- Feta
- Galotyri
- Kaskavali
- Kefalograviera
- Kefalotyri
- Metsovone, Foumarino, Boukovela and Metsovela from Metsovo
- Tyrogliata
- Vasilotyri
- Ourda cheese

== Dishes and specialities ==
- Many types of pites (pies) including kasiopita (kikitsopita), kothropita, kimadopita, pepéki, kasiata and blatsariá
- Hilopites
- Frog legs
- Kontosouvli
- Loukaniko
- Trahanas

== Desserts/drinks ==
- Amygdalopita
- Spoon sweets
- Klostari
- Blatsara
- Stegnopita (dry pie)
- Kassiopita (flour pie)
- Flogera (Metsovo)
- Greek wine
