= Aromanian cuisine =

Cuisine of the Aromanians

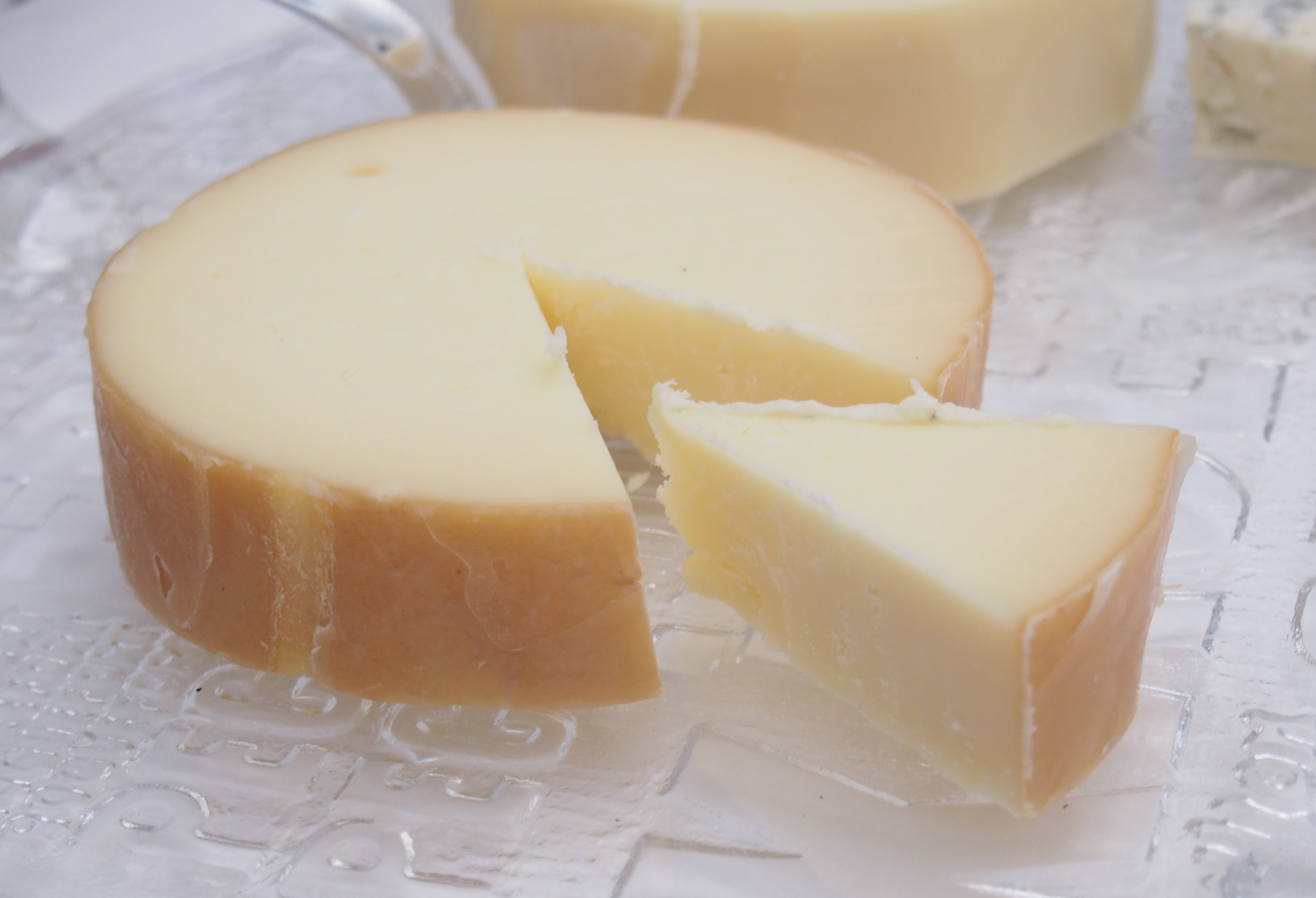
Metsovone, a popular cheese from the Aromanian village of Metsovo, in Greece

Aromanian cuisine (Aromanian: Cuzina armãneascã) is the traditional cuisine of the Aromanians. The Aromanians are a small Balkan ethnic group scattered throughout the region, living in the countries of Albania, Bulgaria, Greece, North Macedonia, Romania and Serbia. Aromanian cuisine has been strongly influenced by Mediterranean and Middle Eastern cuisine.

In Greece, the Aromanian village of Metsovo (Aminciu) stands out for the cheeses made there. The most popular cheeses from Metsovo are Metsovone and Metsovela, although other types of cheeses such as Graviera are also produced in Metsovo. Much of the cheeses coming from Metsovo are fabricated on the Tositsa Foundation Cheese Factory, operating since 1958. Aside from cheeses, some typical Metsovite dishes include meats such as kontosouvli and sausages, as well as pies with vegetables and mushrooms and bean soup, all of which can be accompanied with local wine. Outside of Metsovo, the Aromanian pie Batzina is popular in the area of Aspropotamos, and a book has been published on the local cuisine of the village.

In Romania, some dishes of the Aromanian community include vegetable pies, especially made of leek, and fried peppers. The Aromanians of Romania also make cheese, and also consume meats such as poultry on normal days and pork on holidays and special occasions. Various types of polenta (or mămăligă, as known in Romania) also stand out. Aromanian cuisine has some presence in the region of Dobruja, but virtually none in the rest of Romania. A book has also been published on the Aromanian cuisine of Dobruja. Furthermore, in 2023, a restaurant of Aromanian cuisine from Greece, Bar Vlaha, opened in Brookline near Boston, in the United States.

== See also ==
- Balkan cuisine
- Mediterranean cuisine
