= Xygalo Siteias =

Xygalo Siteias (Greek: Ξύγαλο Σητείας) is a traditional Greek cheese with Protected Designation of Origin (PDO) status since 2008–2011. It originates from the region of Siteia, in the province of Lasithi, in eastern Crete.
