= Saganaki cheese =

Greek and Turkish cuisine

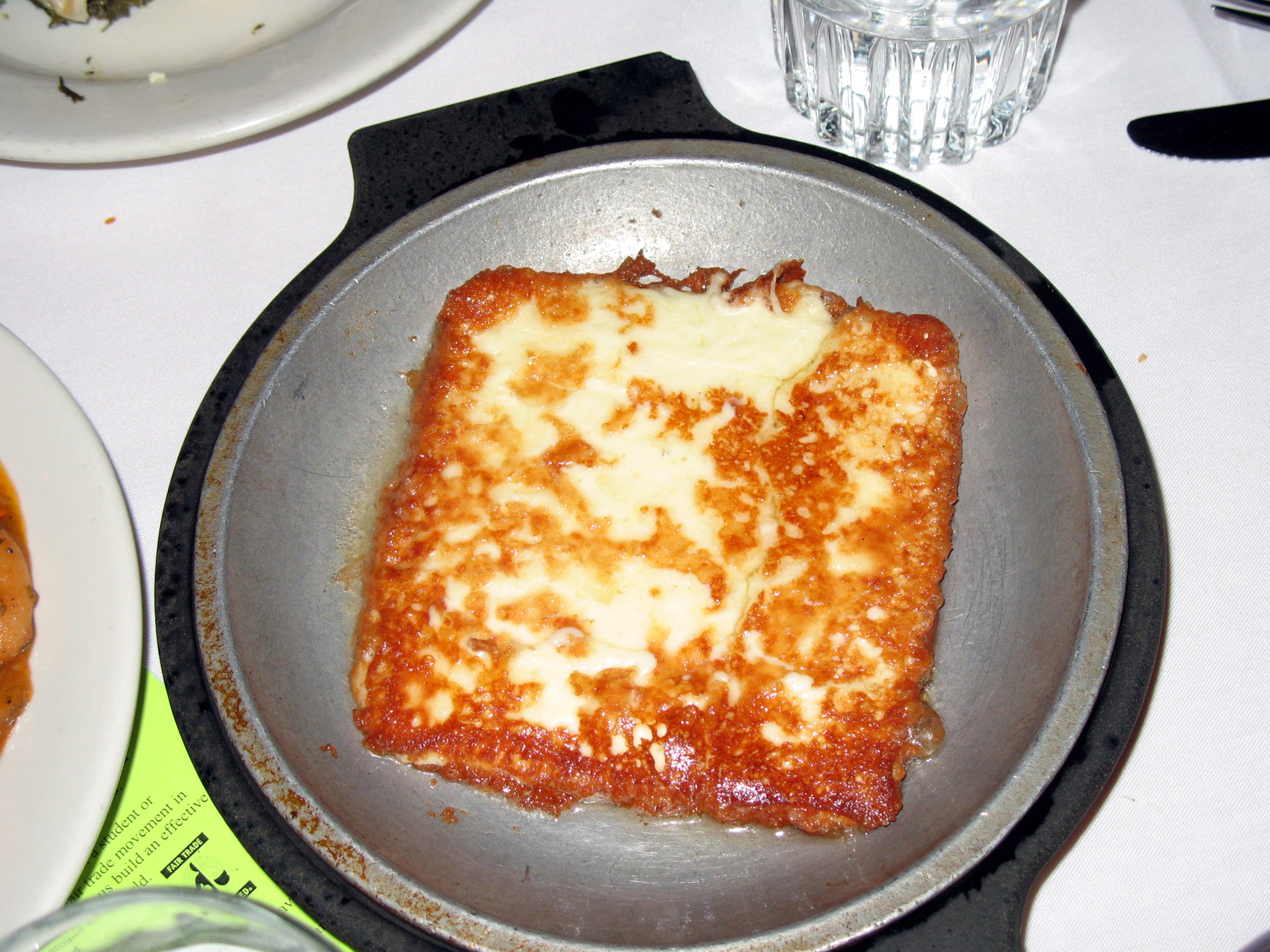
- Saganaki cooked
- Region: Turkey, Greece
- Town: Aegean Region
- Source of milk: Sheep, goat, cow milk

Saganaki cheese (Turkish: saganaki peyniri) is a Greek and Turkish cheese made of sheep's milk, cow's milk, goat's milk, or a combination, and used to prepare saganaki. Some saganaki cheese is similar to the basket cheese made in Aegean Turkey.

It is sometimes flavored with thyme, walnut, mastic, red pepper, cinnamon, black seed, black pepper, or olive oil. It can be smoke-cured.

== See also ==
- Greek cuisine
- Turkish cuisine
