= Manouri =

Greek goat or sheep cheese

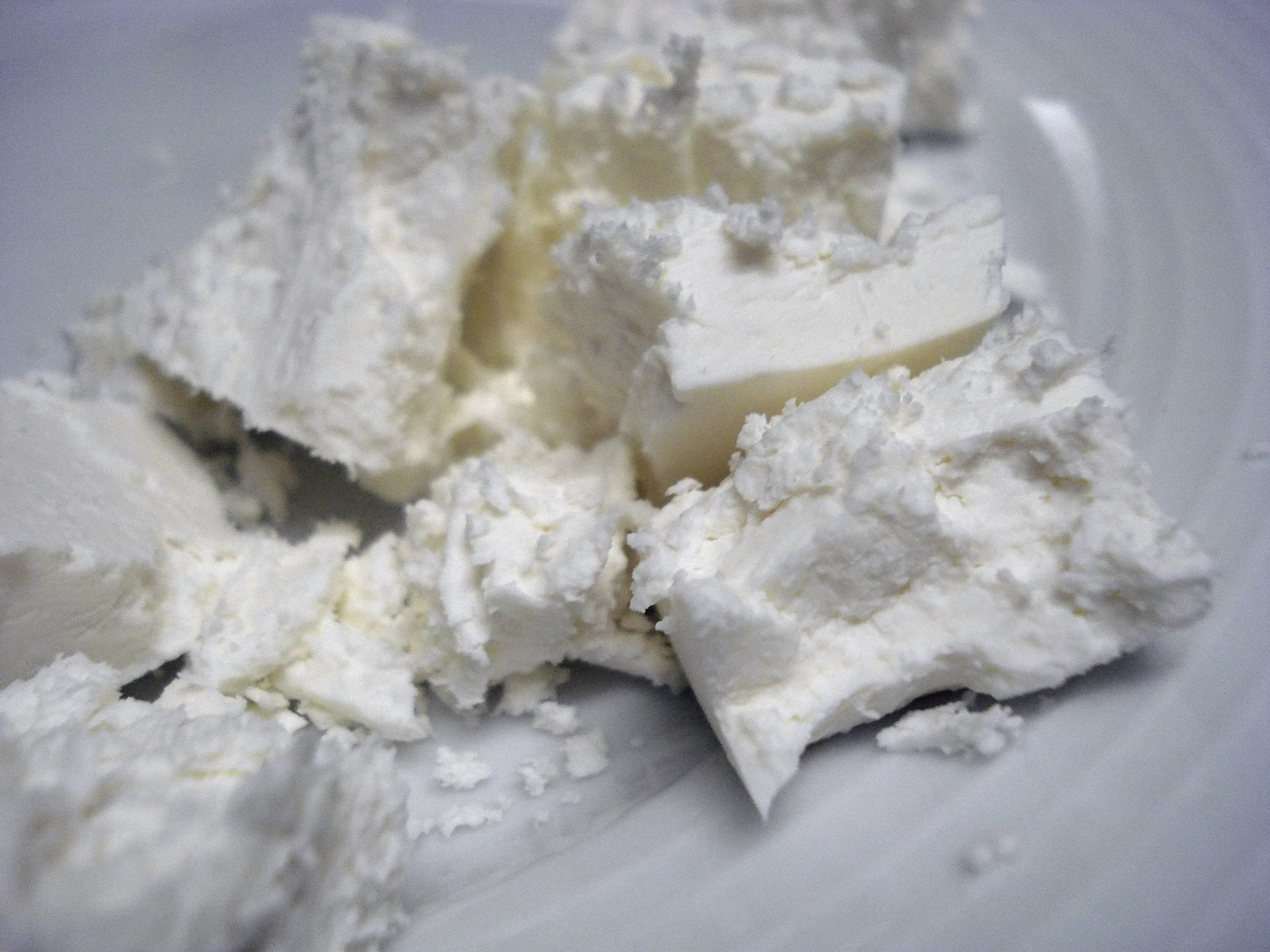
- Manouri
- Country of origin: Greece
- Region: Thessaly, Northern Macedonia, Central Macedonia
- Source of milk: Goat or sheep’s milk
- Texture: Soft and creamy
- Aging time: 60 days
- Certification: PDO (21 June 1996)

Manouri (Greek: μανούρι) is a Greek semi-soft, fresh white mixed milk-whey cheese made from goat or sheep milk following the production of Feta. It is produced primarily in Thessalia and Macedonia in central and northern Greece with origins dating back to Ancient Greece. It is named in reference to the Greek word "manos", which means "thin".

Manouri is creamier than Feta, because of the addition of cream to the whey. It has only 0.8% salt content, making it much less salty as well. It is used in salads, pastries, or as a dessert cheese. It can be substituted for cream cheese in dishes such as cheesecake.

According to the Washington Post, "Manouri’s light aroma is slightly sour, similar to that of fresh yogurt, but it lacks yogurt’s (or feta’s) acidity. Instead, it has a clean, subtle nutty flavor with a bit of sheepiness and the barest hint of tang. What really elevates the cheese, though, is its texture."

Manouri has Protected Designation of Origin (PDO) status. It is described by the National Dairy Commitee of Greece as "the most excellent traditional Greek whey cheese".

== History ==
According to a shepherd from a multi-generational Manouri makers family, Manouri is traditionally created from whey collected during the manufacturing of Batzos, a semi-hard cheese. The traditional process involves “beating” the coagulum to increase whey fat. Historically, Batzos was produced when cheesemakers needed high fat whey to make high-quality Manouri. As such, although it is a whey cheese, Manouri is the main product of this cheesemaking process and Batzos a secondary product.

== Production ==
Manouri’s production is very similar to that of Myzithra, another cheese that is produced without the use of starter cultures. It is a product of the whey obtained while making other Greek cheeses, such as Batzos or Feta, with added high-fat sheep or goat’s milk. Traditional Manouri-making steps include the following:

Salt (~182g/30L) is added to the whey, which is then heated on a gas flame and stirred repeatedly. Heating and stirring continues until ~30 minutes into the cheese-making process, or 71°C-79°C, when the cheese has nearly completely curdled. It is then exposed to heat for an additional 5 minutes, or until temperatures of 83–84°C. After placing these fresh Manouri curds into cheesecloths and molds, the molds are then hung in a dedicated cheese room, where they cool and drain until the following morning or, at minimum, 4-5 hours. Cheese rooms have temperatures ranging from 4-5℃.

Upon completion, Manouri features PH values ranging from 6.0-6.5 and contains roughly 70% moisture, 70% fat, 1% salt, and 10.9% protein. Because of this composition, it is prone to spoil quickly. In addition, Manouri is known for distinct characteristics, including a 10-12cm diameter, 20-30cm height, cylindrical form, and noticeable fattiness and creaminess. It is creamier than Feta because of the addition of cream or high-fat milk to the whey, which makes it non-crumbly when cutting. For 100 grams of cheese, there is 460 calories and 109 micrograms of calcium.

In 2021, over 1800 recorded tons of Manouri were produced in Greece, with an additional 18 tons of organic Manouri. It was the 6th most produced PDO status cheese that year, behind Feta and organic Feta, Kefalograviera, Kasseri, and Graviera Kritis.

Modern Manouri cheese production trends include relying solely on female sheep's milk, known as ovine, which is nutrient-rich. Best quality Manouri batches are made from specifically-chosen whey, colostrum, and cream.

== Greek Cuisine ==
Manouri is part of Greece's diverse cheesemaking tradition, which includes varieties such as Feta, Kasseri, Graviera, and Anthotyros. It has a creamy texture and a rich dairy flavour with subtle tangy and citrus notes. Its relatively high fat content compared with other Greek whey cheeses contributes to its rich and buttery characteristics. These qualities make it a versatile ingredient in Greek cuisine.

Manouri cheese is commonly used in hot or cold and sweet or savory dishes, particularly in desserts and appetizers. Recipes featuring Manouri include grilled preparations with mushrooms and herbs, as well as dishes combining the cheese with figs and grilled vegetables. It is also used in sweet baked goods and traditional Greek pastries, where its creamy consistency makes it a suitable alternative to cream cheese.

== Certification ==
Manouri's presence has expanded outside its country of origin, with increasing recognition in markets across the European Union. On June 21, 1996, the cheese's production was recognized through the Protected Designation of Origin (PDO) system, which protects products that are closely linked to their geographical origin and traditional production methods. This designation helps preserve Greece's cheesemaking heritage while ensuring that products meet specific production and quality requirements. On Manouri's Greek Wikipedia page, the date associated with Manouri’s official PDO specification traces back to January 11, 1994 (Government Gazette 8/11-01-94).

== See also ==
- List of cheeses
- Mizithra - Another Greek sheep cheese with very similar flavor, but drier
