= Batzos =

Greek brined cheese

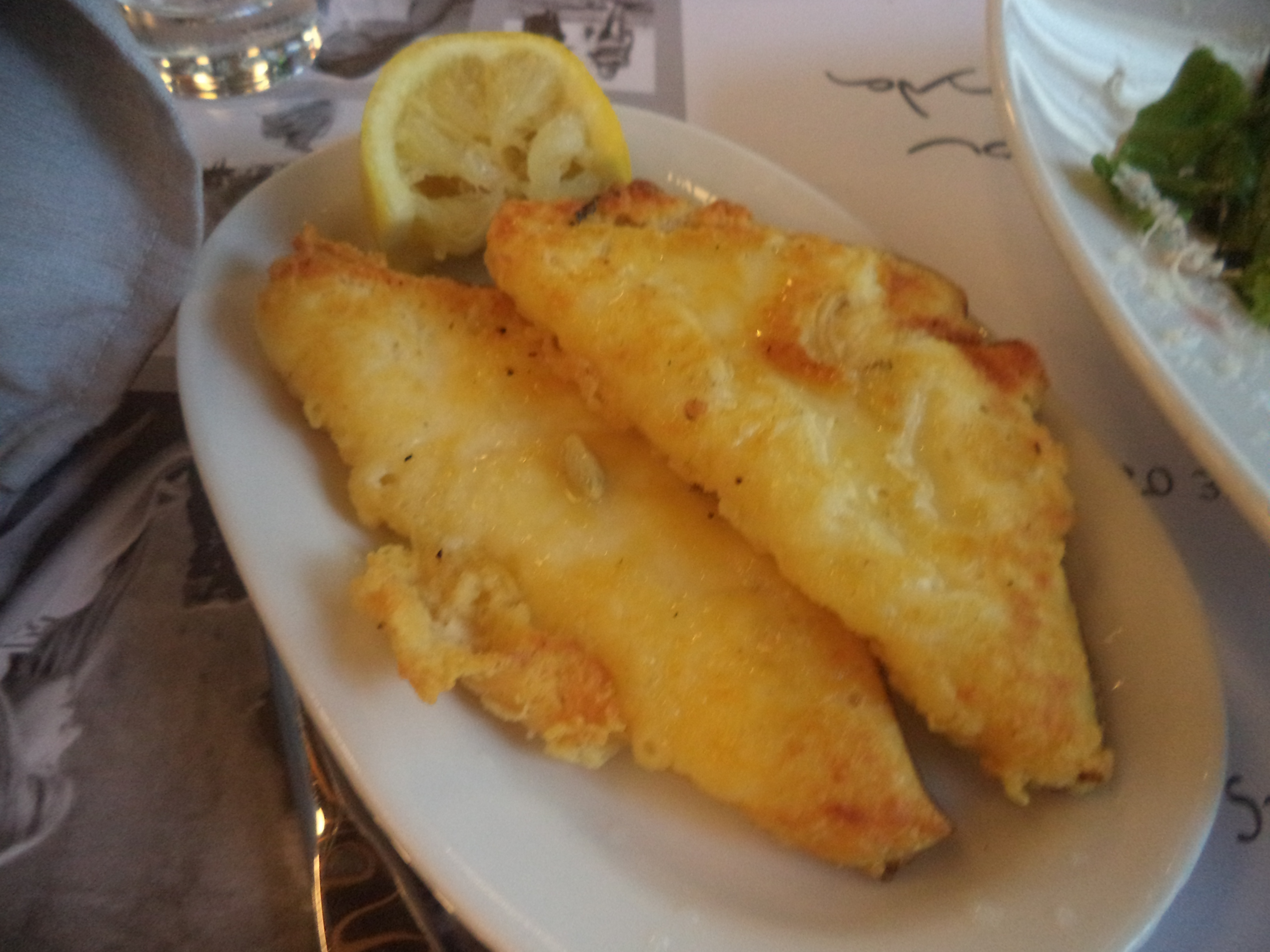
- Batzos cheese from Veroia, Greece
- Country of origin: Greece
- Region: Western Macedonia, Central Macedonia and Thessaly
- Source of milk: Sheep's or goat's milk, or a mixture
- Pasteurized: Raw or pasteurized
- Texture: Semi-hard to hard
- Fat content: At least 25% in dry matter
- Aging time: At least 3 months
- Certification: PDO (1996)

Batzos (Greek: Μπάτζος) is a traditional Greek brined cheese. It is made from sheep's milk, goat's milk, or a mixture of the two. It is rindless and semi-hard to hard, with a white to pale yellow body, numerous irregular holes, and a salty, slightly piquant flavor. Its protected production area comprises Western Macedonia, Central Macedonia and Thessaly. The name was recognized in Greece in 1994 and registered as a Protected designation of origin in the European Union in 1996.

== Characteristics ==
The PDO specification limits the cheese's moisture to 45 percent by weight and requires at least 25 percent fat in dry matter. Batzos has no rind. Its body is white to pale yellow and contains many irregular holes. A scholarly review describes it as a low-fat cheese with a sourish and lightly piquant taste.

== Production ==
The PDO specification permits raw or pasteurized sheep's or goat's milk, or a mixture of the two. The milk must come from locally adapted breeds raised within the defined production area, with feed based on the area's flora, and it is partially skimmed before cheesemaking.

The milk is generally warmed to 28 to 32 °C (82 to 90 °F) and coagulated with rennet for about 50 minutes. The curd is broken into small pieces, stirred, heated to as much as 45 °C (113 °F), and drained in cheesecloth. On the following day it is cut into slices and dry-salted with coarse salt. After approximately five days, the cheese is placed in containers with brine containing 10 to 12 percent salt and matured for at least three months. Production and maturation must take place within the designated region.

In the traditional method, repeated stirring or beating of the thickening milk transfers a substantial proportion of its fat to the whey. The fat-rich whey can then be used to make butter when sheep's milk is used, or Manouri when goat's milk or mixed milk is used. This process leaves Batzos comparatively low in fat.

== Protected designation of origin ==
The Greek Ministry of Agriculture recognized Batzos as a protected designation of origin in January 1994. A correction published in February 1994 added Thessaly to the stated production area and clarified that the cheese has a semi-hard to hard body. The name was registered at European Community level by Commission Regulation (EC) No 1107/96, which entered into force on June 21, 1996.

Under the PDO specification, the use of colorants, preservatives and antibiotic substances in the cheese or its brine is prohibited.

== Culinary uses ==
Batzos may be eaten plain, fried, or served with eggs.

== See also ==
- List of Greek Protected Designations of Origin cheeses
