= Ladotyri Mytilinis =

Greek cheese preserved in olive oil

Ladotyri Mytilinis (Greek: Λαδοτύρι Μυτιλήνης) is a traditionally prepared Protected Designation of Origin (PDO) cheese from Greece, preserved in extra virgin olive oil.

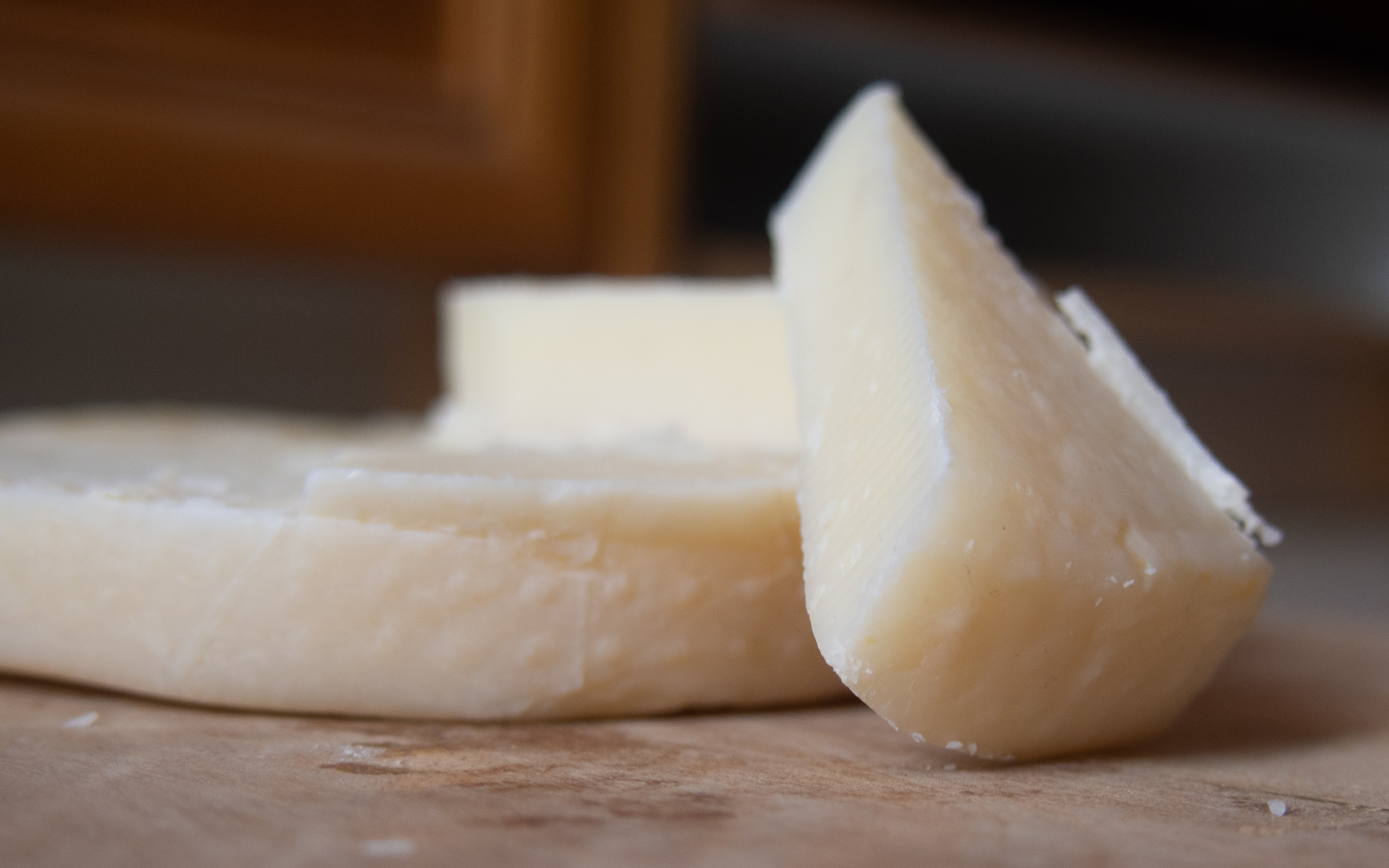

It is made on the island of Lesbos in the Northern Aegean Islands, and has been produced since ancient times. The cheese is made with sheep milk or with a mixture of sheep and goat milk, the latter of which should not exceed 30%.

The official designation for this hard table cheese notes the following production method: "The milk is coagulated with added rennet at 32-34 deg C in 30 minutes. The curd is then broken up and reheated to 45 deg C. Most of the whey is then removed and the curds are pressed in the bottom of the vat to form a compact mass. This is cut into pieces weighing between 5 and 7 kilos. The pieces are then placed on a bench and cut again to their final cheese size. They are then placed in special moulds, firmly pressed by hand, salted and taken to a ripening room where they remain for not less than 3 months."

PDO status was granted on June 12, 1996, by the European Union, following Ministerial Decision No. 313058 in Greece, dated January 18, 1994.

== Cultural impact ==
Livestock farming and cheese production (along with olive farming) are very important for the agricultural sector of the island of Lesbos. The PDO cheese itself "is an emblematic product for the local population with strong cultural connotations". Ladotyri means "oil cheese" in the Greek language; such a method of preservation was common until household refrigerators became common in the 1960s and 1970s. According to the official designation, the milk must come from "sheep and goats traditionally fed and adapted to the area of production. Their diet must be based on the flora of the area". Most of the cheese produced is sold to supermarkets rather than directly from the farm to consumers. The mass-market version of the cheese is called Graviera, for which consumption had declined from 1998 to 2005. Demand for the PDO product increased during the same period.

== See also ==
- List of cheeses
