= Saganaki =

Greek fried cheese dish

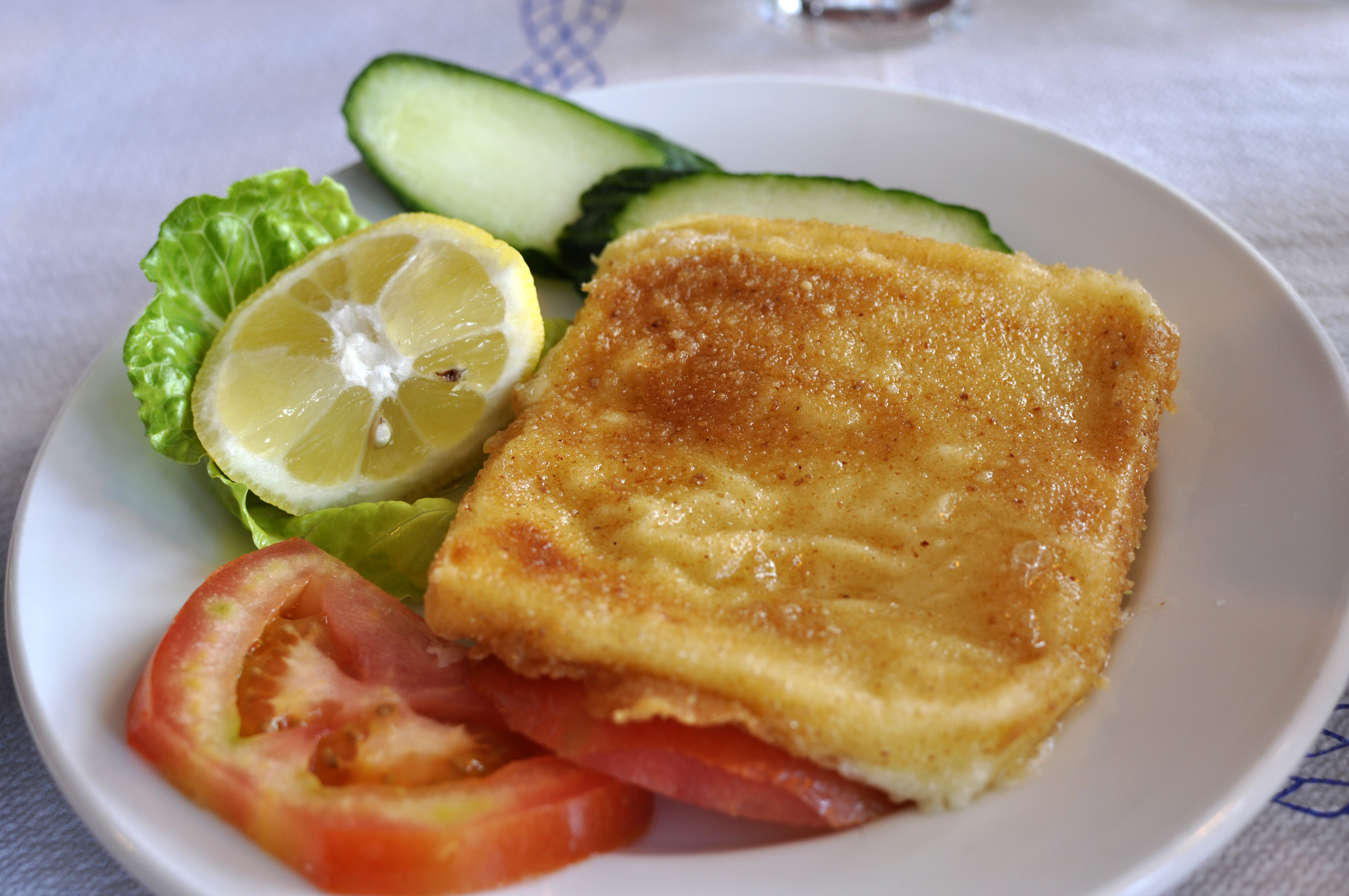
- Course: Hors d'oeuvre
- Place of origin: Greece
- Variations: Many

In Greek cuisine, saganaki (/ˌsɑːɡəˈnɑːki/; Greek: σαγανάκι [saɣaˈnaci]) is any one of a variety of dishes prepared in a small frying pan, the best-known being an appetizer of fried cheese. It is commonly flambéed in North America.

== Etymology ==
The dishes are named for the frying pan in which they are prepared, called a σαγανάκι (saganáki), which is a diminutive of σαγάνι (sagáni), a frying pan with two handles, which comes from the Turkish word sahan 'copper dish', itself borrowed from Arabic صحن (ṣaḥn).

== Description ==
The cheese used in saganaki is usually graviera, kefalograviera, halloumi, kasseri, kefalotyri, or sheep's milk feta cheese. Regional variations include the use of formaela cheese in Arachova, halloumi in Cyprus, and vlahotiri in Metsovo. The cheese is melted in a small frying pan until it is bubbling and generally served with lemon juice and pepper. It is eaten with bread.

Other dishes cooked in a saganaki pan include shrimp saganaki (Greek: γαρίδες σαγανάκι, garídes saganáki), and mussels saganaki (Greek: μύδια σαγανάκι, mýdia saganáki), which are typically feta-based and include a spicy tomato sauce.

=== North American serving style ===
Saganaki, lit on fire, at the Parthenon Restaurant in Greektown, Chicago

In many Greek restaurants in the United States and Canada, after the saganaki cheese is fried, it is flambéed at table (often with a shout of "opa!"), after which the flames usually are extinguished with a squeeze of lemon juice. This is called flaming saganaki and is said to have originated in 1968 at the Parthenon restaurant in Chicago's Greektown, based on the suggestion of a customer.

== See also ==
- Leipäjuusto
- List of hors d'oeuvre
- List of Greek dishes
- Saganaki cheese
- Smažený sýr
