= Formaela =

Greek goat or sheep cheese

- Country of origin: Greece
- Source of milk: sheep milk, goat milk

Formaela (Greek: Φορμαέλα) is a hard cheese produced exclusively in Arachova, Greece. It is famous throughout Greece and has been registered in the European Union as a protected designation of origin since 1996.

Formaela is prepared mainly from sheep's or goat's milk, has a hard and cohesive shell and is a light yellow color, without holes. It has a particularly pungent taste, and is usually consumed grilled or fried. Its chemical composition is: maximum moisture content of 38%, a minimum fat content of 40%.

== See also ==
- List of cheeses
