= Kefalotyri =

Sheep and goat cheese of Greece and Cyprus

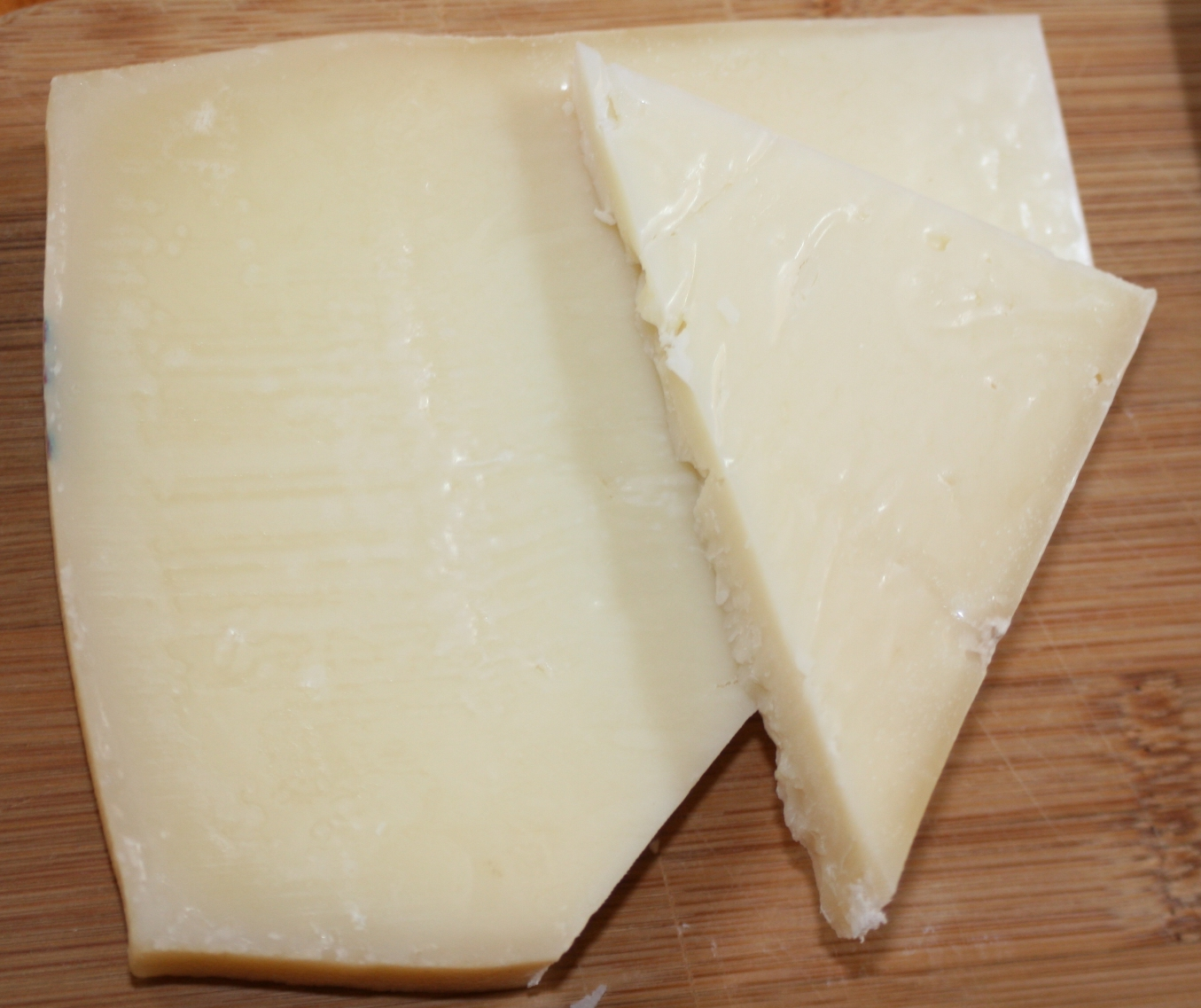
- Country of origin: Greece, Cyprus
- Source of milk: sheep or goat (or both)
- Texture: hard
- Aging time: 3 months or more

Kefalotyri or kefalotiri (Greek: κεφαλοτύρι) is a hard, salty white cheese made from sheep milk or goat's milk (or both) in Greece and Cyprus. A similar cheese, Kefalograviera, also made from sheep or goat milk (or both), is sometimes sold outside Greece and Cyprus as Kefalotyri. Depending on the mixture of milk used in the process, the color can vary between yellow and white.

A very hard cheese, kefalotyri can be consumed as is, fried in olive oil for a dish called saganaki, or added to foods such as pasta dishes, meat, or cooked vegetables, and is especially suited for grating. It is also used along with feta cheese in the vast majority of recipes for spanakopita, though sometimes substituted with the broadly similar Italian-derived cheeses Romano or Parmesan. This is a popular and well-known cheese, establishing its roots in Greece during the Byzantine era. It can be found in some gourmet or speciality stores in other countries. Young cheeses take two to three months to ripen. An aged kefalotyri, a year old or more, is drier with a stronger flavour, and may be eaten as a meze with ouzo, or grated on food.

== Etymology ==
Kefalotyri is a compound of Greek: κεφαλί : kephalí, meaning head, and Greek: τυρί : turí meaning cheese. This may be a reference to the headlike shape of the cheese wheel.

== See also ==
- List of cheeses
