= Kopanisti =

Greek cheese

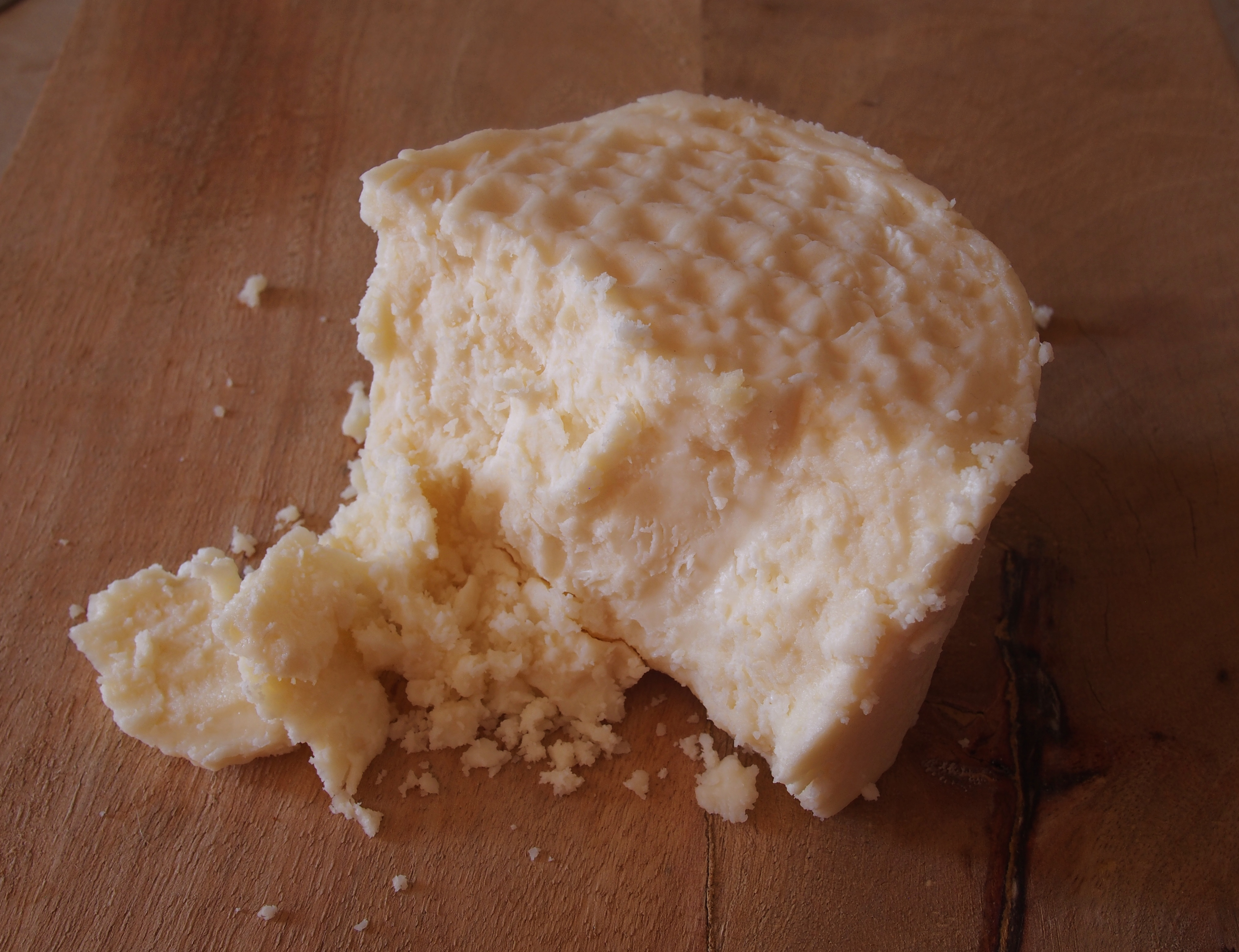
- Country of origin: Greece
- Region: Cyclades
- Source of milk: Cow's milk or sheep's milk or a mixture of both
- Texture: soft mould
- Fat content: 19.4%
- Protein content: 16.7%
- Aging time: 45–60 days
- Certification: PDO

Kopanisti (Greek: Κοπανιστή) is a salty, spicy cheese, with protected designation of origin (PDO) produced in the Greek islands of the Cyclades in the Aegean Sea such as Mykonos, Tinos, Andros, Syros, Naxos etc.; it has been produced in Mykonos for more than 300 years. It owes its special peppery and spicy taste to rapid and extensive lipolysis and proteolysis caused by abundant microbial growth encouraged by repeated kneadings performed during the ripening process.

In Turkey it is known as kopanisti peyniri or acı peynir (kopanisti cheese and bitter cheese, respectively, in Turkish), and is traditionally made in Çeşme and Karaburun districts of İzmir Province. In Turkey, it is normally made from goat's milk.

== Etymology ==
"Kopanisti" in the Greek language is used to describe something that has been beaten. In Kopanisti cheese this refers to its technique of preparation: the cheese is left to age in wide-necked containers until it develops abundant microbial flora, which is then mixed throughout the cheese mass by kneading. This is repeated three or four times until the ripening of the cheese is complete, after 30 to 40 days. It is made from cow, sheep or goat's milk or a mixture thereof.

== Preparation ==
Preparation of Kopanisti includes artisanal cultures, derived from practice of using some of the previous batches of produced cheese as inoculum for new batches. At first the milk is cooked at 28–30 °C (82–86 °F) with yeast until it gets thick. This procedure usually takes about 20–24 hours. After this it needs to be dried and red chili peppers and salt are added. The manufacturer works the mixture by hands once every hour for the first 24 hours. Then the mixture is wrapped in cotton cloth and placed in a cooking pot with a stone placed on top of the cheese. This method helps the cheese to get rid of extra liquids. It remains in the cloth for a week in order to mature and let the fungus grow. It is then again mixed and put in containers (traditionally earthenware) to complete its aging, which can take between one and two months.

The most popular way of serving is in a dish called "mostra" which contains dry bread with kopanisti cheese, chopped tomatoes and olive oil. Mykoniotes also use it as a meze to accompany the Greek drink ouzo.

== See also ==
- List of cheeses
