= Kefalograviera =

Greek cheese

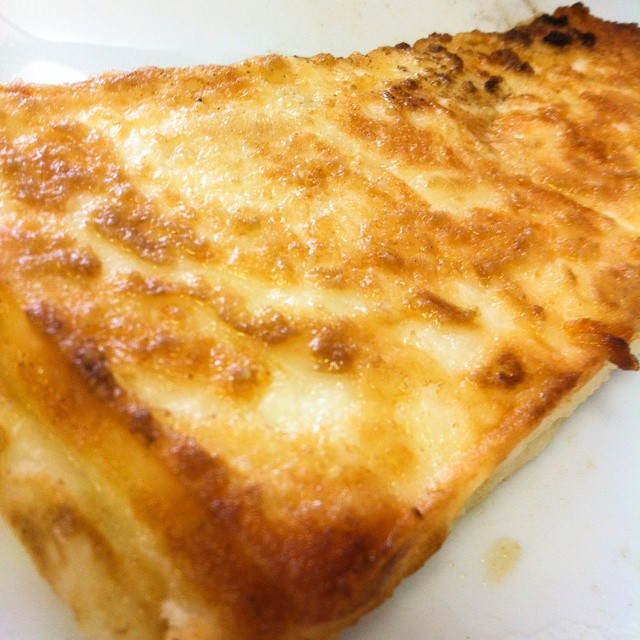
Saganaki made with pan fried kefalograviera cheese

Kefalograviera (Greek: Κεφαλογραβιέρα) is a hard table cheese produced traditionally from sheep's milk or a mixture of sheep's and goat's milk.

The cheese is produced in Western Macedonia, Epirus, and the regional units of Aetolia-Acarnania and Evrytania.

The cheese has a salty flavour and rich aroma. It is often used in a Greek dish called Saganaki, cut into triangular pieces, rolled in seasoned flour and lightly fried. It is very well suited for grating and widely used as a topping for pasta dishes. According to one cookbook, "At its best, it is as good as or better than Romano or aged Asiago." It is very similar to Kefalotyri cheese and sometimes is sold under that name.

Kefalograviera/Κεφαλογραβιέρα has PDO status in the EU and the UK.

== See also ==
- List of cheeses
- Graviera
