= Metsovone =

Greek cheese

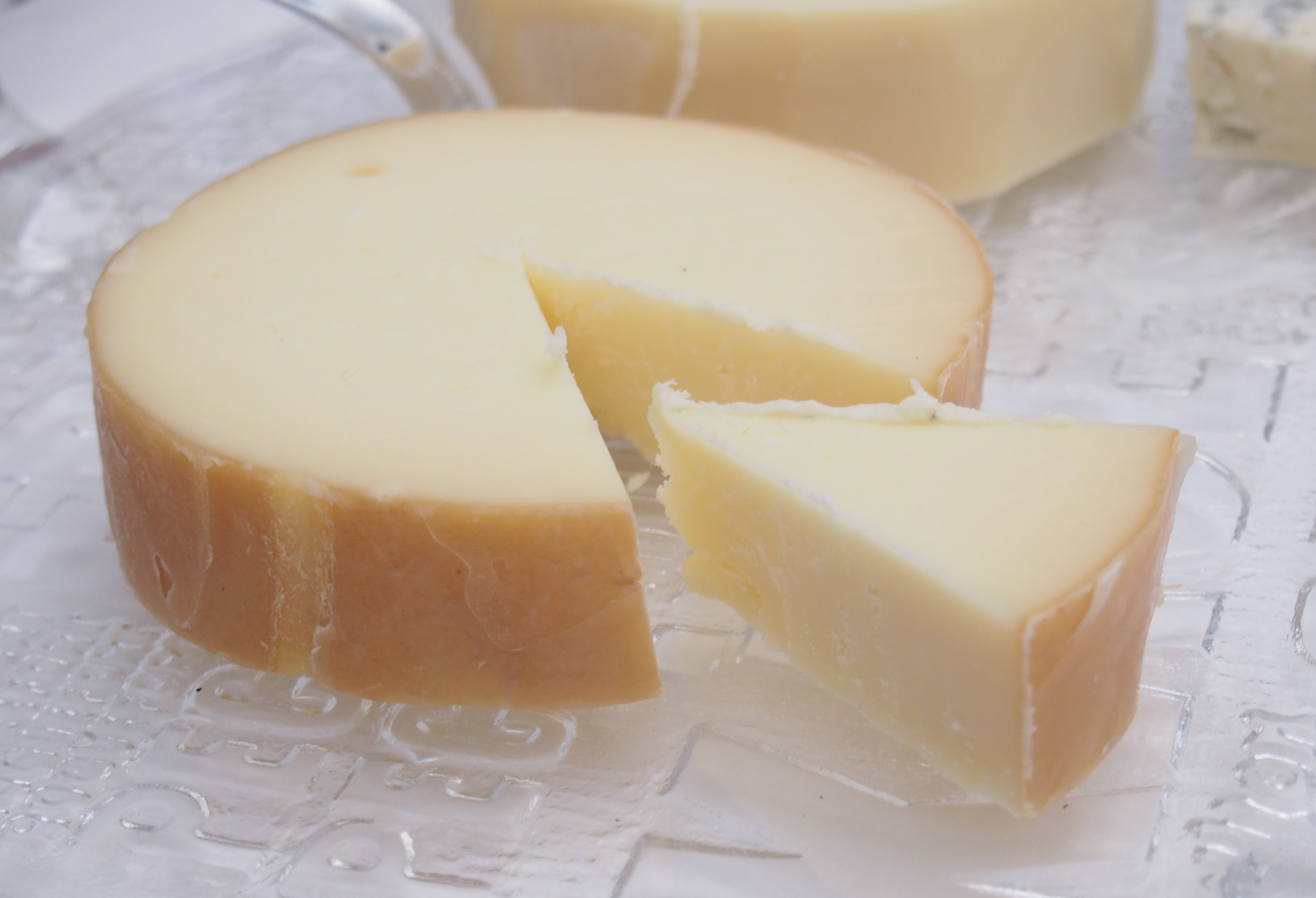
- Country of origin: Greece
- Town: Metsovo
- Source of milk: Cows, goats, sheep
- Pasteurised: Traditionally not but commercially
- Texture: Semi-hard
- Fat content: 25.9%
- Protein content: 26.8%
- Aging time: >3 months
- Certification: PDO EU
- Named after: Metsovo

Metsovone (Greek: Μετσοβόνε) is a semi-hard smoked pasta filata cheese produced in the Aromanian village of Metsovo in Epirus, Greece. Metsovone has been a European protected designation of origin since 1996. This cheese, along with Metsovela, is one of the most popular culinary attractions of Metsovo. These cheeses are produced in the Tositsa Foundation Cheese Factory of Metsovo.

Metsovone is manufactured from cow's milk or a mixture of cow and sheep or goat milk.

== See also ==
- List of cheeses
- List of smoked foods
- Cuisine of Greece
- Aromanian cuisine
