= Graviera =

Greek sheep-milk cheese

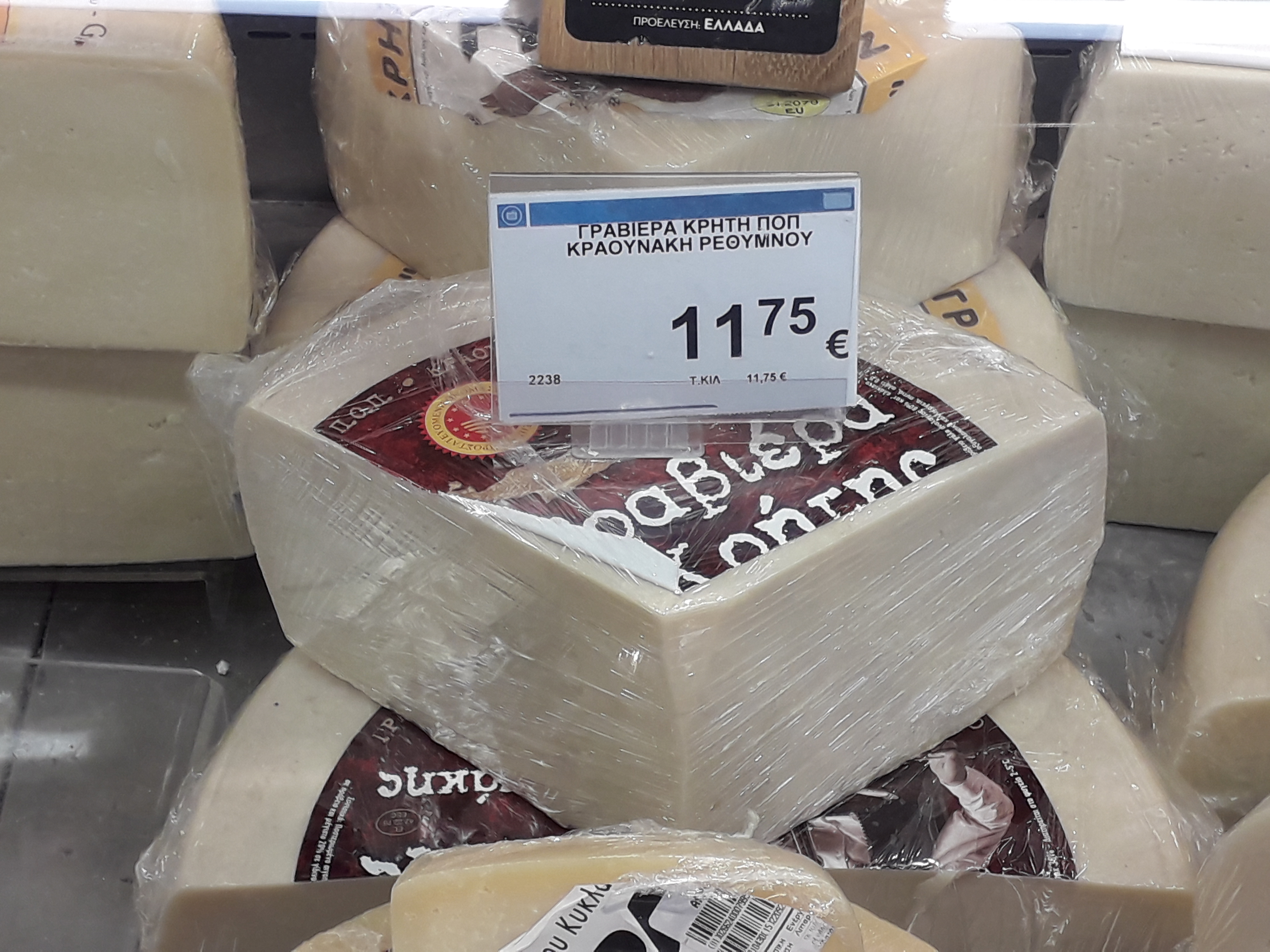
- Country of origin: Greece
- Region: Amfilochia; Crete; Lesbos; Naxos
- Source of milk: cow goat sheep
- Pasteurized: Yes
- Texture: hard
- Aging time: 5–12 months
- Certification: PDOs: Γραβιέρα Κρήτης / Graviera Kritis; Γραβιέρα Αγράφων / Graviera Agrafon; Γραβιέρα Νάξου / Graviera Naxou

Graviera (Greek: γραβιέρα [ɣraˈvʝera]) is a hard cheese produced in various parts of Greece, the main varieties of which are Crete, Lesbos, Naxos and Amfilochia. It resembles gruyère, a Swiss cheese from whose name "graviera" is derived.

Graviera is Greece's second most popular cheese after feta. Made in wheels, the cheese has its rind marked with the characteristic crisscross pattern of its draining cloth. There are various types of graviera produced in Greece. Graviera of Crete is made from sheep's milk and ripened for at least five months. It is slightly sweet, with a burnt caramel flavor. The graviera of Naxos, in contrast, is mostly made of cow's milk (80–100%).

Graviera can be sliced and eaten, fried as saganaki and eaten as a snack, grated and served over pasta dishes, baked in a casserole or used in salads (in cubes or shavings). It is widely available outside Greece, sold at large grocery stores, Greek or ethnic markets, and specialty cheese shops, as well as online. Gruyère can be used as a substitute, but graviera is homier.

== Geographical indications ==
Three Graviera have been registered as protected designation of origin products in the EU and in the UK:

- Γραβιέρα Κρήτης / Graviera Kritis
- Γραβιέρα Αγράφων / Graviera Agrafon
- Γραβιέρα Νάξου / Graviera Naxou

== See also ==
- List of cheeses
