= Oreilles d'âne =

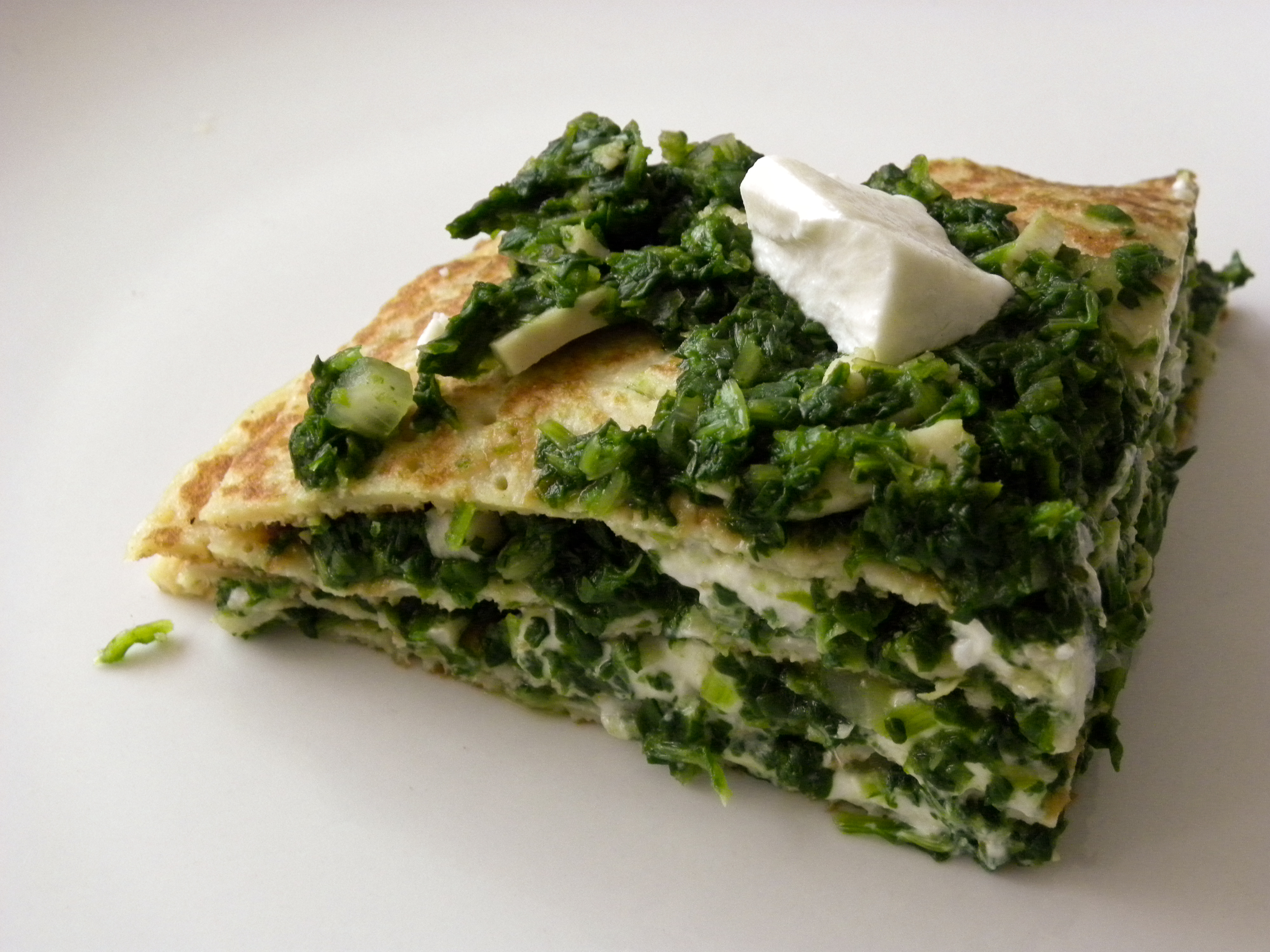
- Oreilles d'âne made with crêpes
- Type: Casserole
- Place of origin: France
- Region or state: La Salette-Fallavaux
- Serving temperature: Hot
- Main ingredients: Tétragones, tomme cheese, béchamel sauce
- Variations: With lasagna or crêpes
- Other information: Served with white wine

Oreilles d'âne (lit. 'donkey's ears') is a traditional recipe of the Valgaudemar and Champsaur valleys and the region around La Salette-Fallavaux in the French Alps. It is a gratin casserole of wild spinach and either lasagna or crêpes.

== Name ==
The dish acquires its name from its key ingredient of wild spinach, which at maturity have leaves likened in shape to a donkey's ear.

== Traditional recipe ==
The tradition recipe was to use small round pastas cut into pieces, which were poached in salted water, layered in a gratin alternating with spinach leaves cooked au jus, béchamel sauce and grated tomme, and baked.

In the village of La Salette-Fallavaux, oreilles d'âne were made of large ravioli garnished with chard or poached spinach, topped with béchamel sauce and au gratin.

== Modern recipe ==
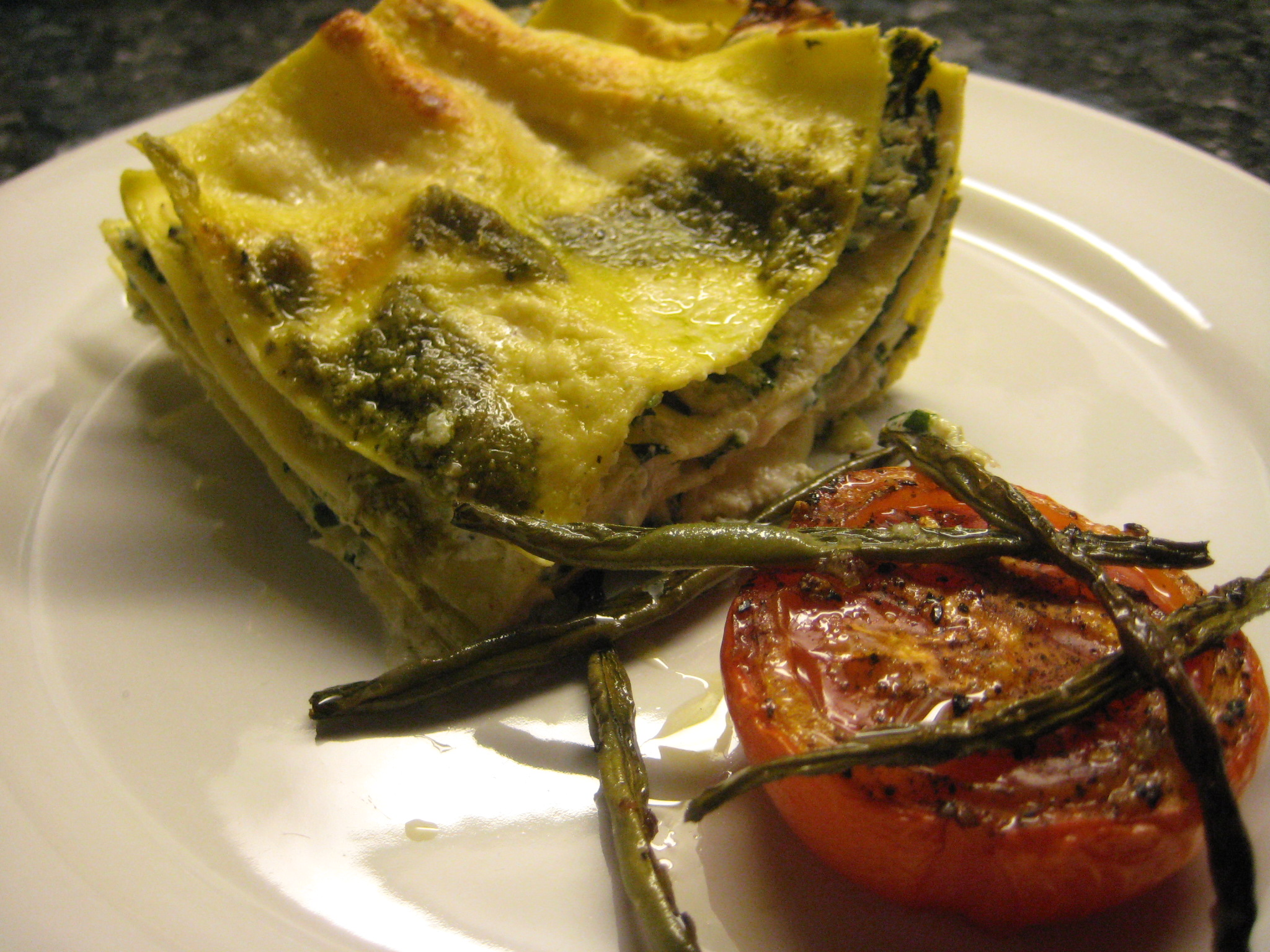
Gratin of oreilles d'âne with lasagna

Today lasagna or crouzet (see crozets de Savoie) is used in alternating layers with creamed spinach and grated cheese.
