= Belarusian cuisine =

Culinary traditions of Belarus

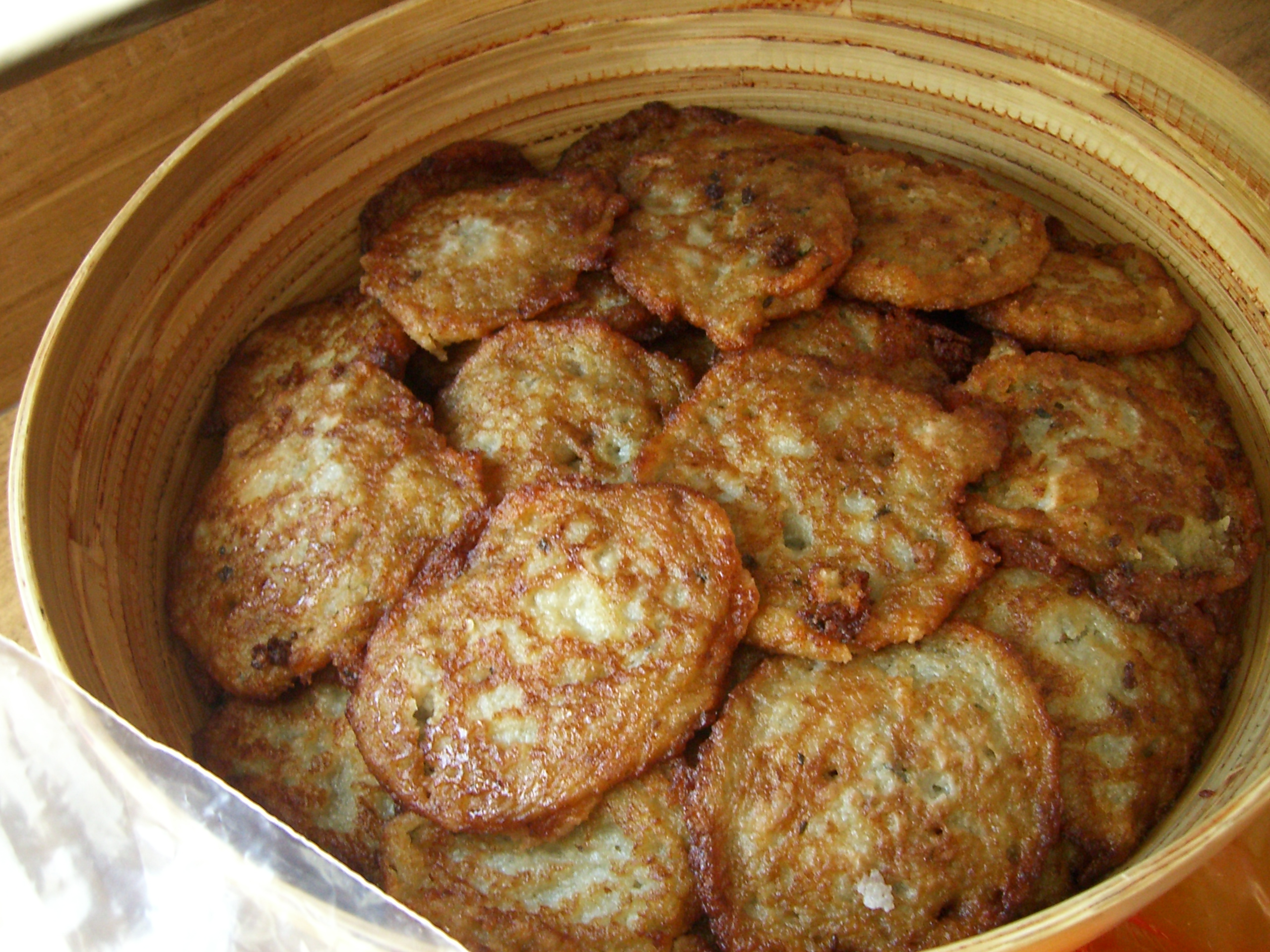
Draniki is a traditional crockery dish.

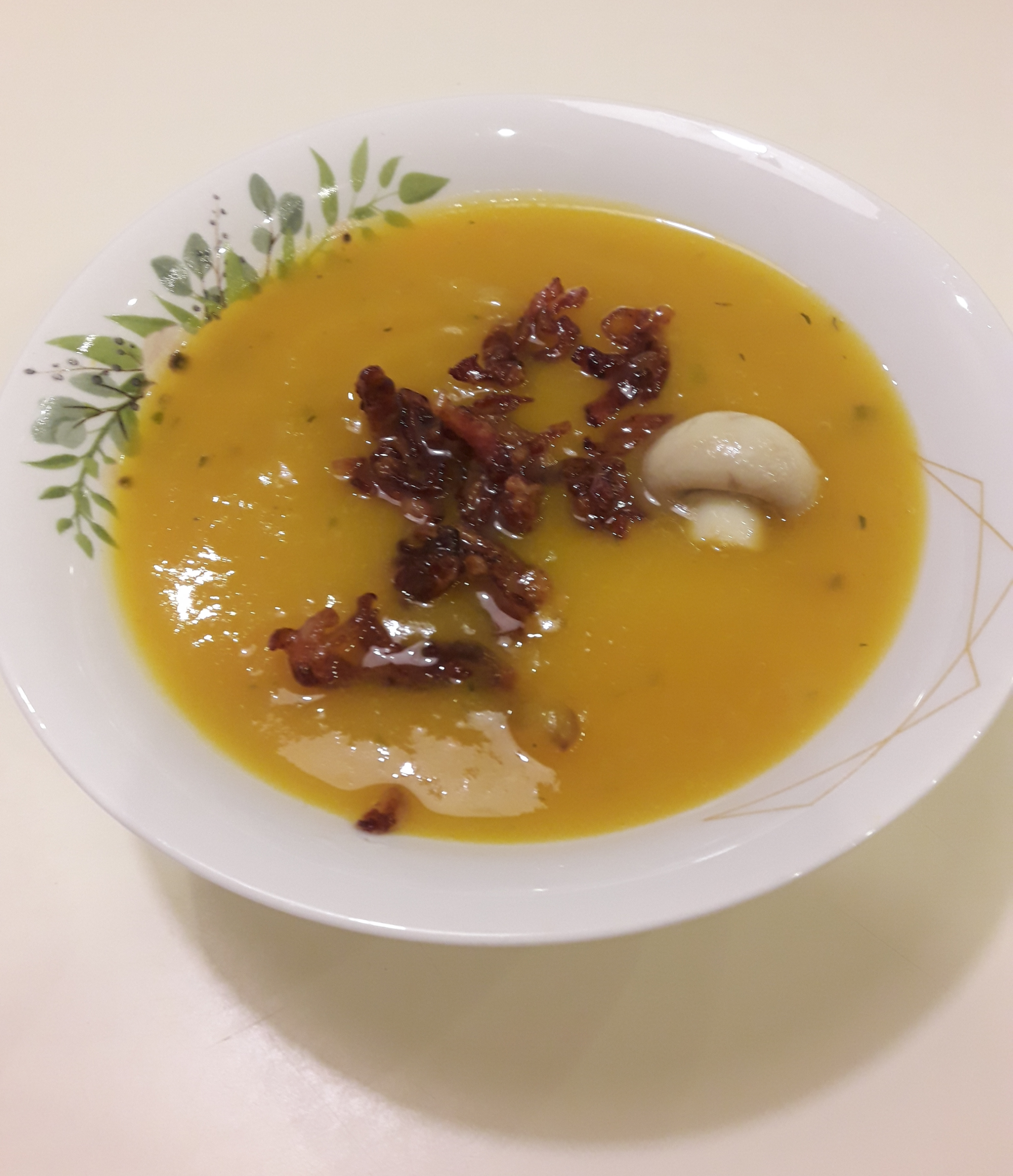
Garbuzok (Belarusian pumpkin soup) with mushrooms and sauteed onions

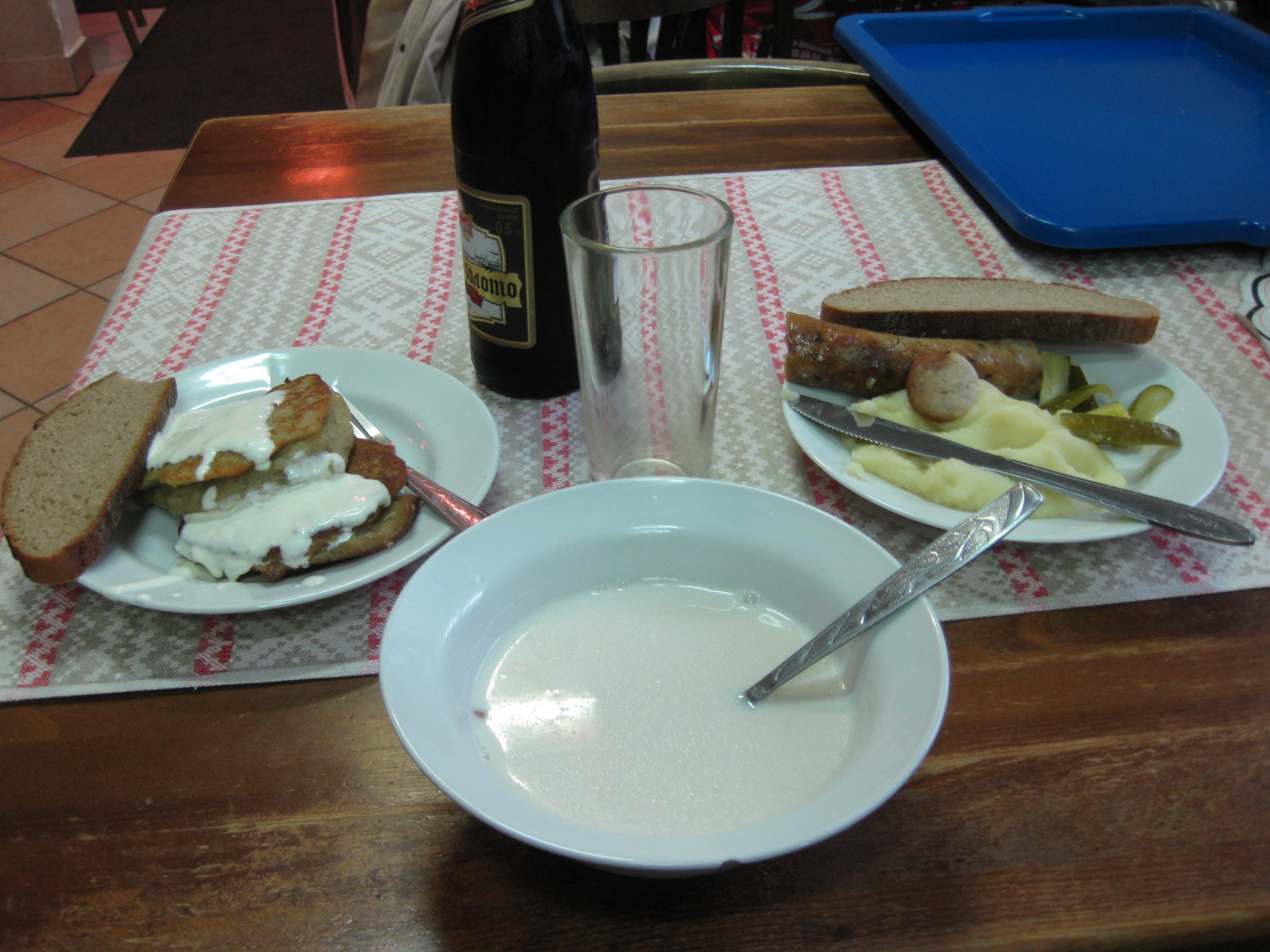
A meal at a cafe in Vitebsk

Belarusian cuisine (Note: Belarusian: Беларуская кухня, romanized: Biełaruskaja kuchnia, pronounced [bʲeɫɐˈruskəjə ˈkuxnʲə]) refers to the culinary traditions native to Belarus and its people. It shares many similarities with the cuisines of other Central and Eastern European countries, particularly those of Poland, Russia, and Ukraine. It is based predominantly on meat and various vegetables typical of the region.

== History ==
Belarusian cuisine has predominantly Slavic roots. Along with a Ruthenian influence, it is also linked with Lithuanian and Polish because of the long intermingling of these three peoples; first within the Grand Duchy of Lithuania (11th–16th centuries) and later within the Polish–Lithuanian Commonwealth (16th–17th centuries). Still, some of the borrowed dishes spread throughout the society, such as lazanki (Belarusian: лазанки, a mixture of flour dumplings and stewed meat, related to Italian lasagna) and, above all, various dishes made of grated potatoes, typical of German cuisine.

Modern Belarusian cuisine is still heavily influenced by its recent Soviet past, and many local restaurants feature Russian or Soviet dishes rather than true specialties of local cuisine. However, draniki (both plain and stuffed), borscht, khaladnik (Belarusian: халадник), machanka (Belarusian: мачанка), zrazy (Belarusian: зразы), cold meat rolls, eggs stuffed with mushrooms, halubtsy (Belarusian: галубцы), fried raw pork sausage, and blini are likely to be found everywhere, as well as sour rye bread.

== Meals ==
A traditional peasant or merchant's dinner consisted of just two dishes: soup and a main course. A special kind of clay pot with two compartments, the sparysh (Belarusian: спарыш), was used by farmers' children to bring lunch to their father working in the fields. Prior to World War II, salads or other snacks were not very common, and recipes based on Russian models tended to appear in modern Belarusian post-war cookbooks. Fresh white cheese and various kinds of cold meats (usually smoked) were available, however, at least on holidays.

== Cereals ==
Since wheat does not grow well in a cold and wet climate, Belarusians were always fond of somewhat sour rye bread, and the most traditional hard drink, the local vodka or harelka (Belarusian: гарэлка), was distilled primarily from rye malt.

Like other Slavic peoples, Belarusians could boast of a huge variety of pancakes (bliny) of various thicknesses, plain and filled, made mostly of wheat or buckwheat flour, but also using oatmeal (tsadaviki, Belarusian: цадавики).

Various kinds of cereal, especially barley, oatmeal, and buckwheat, were common. Belarus was the likely centre of Europe's buckwheat culture, and dishes made with this healthy grain used to be very popular: various kinds of buns, cakes, and dumplings, which, except for the well-known kasha, no longer exist today.

== Vegetables ==
The main vegetables were cabbage (often made into sauerkraut) and beets, while turnips, swedes, parsnip and carrots both stewed and boiled (with the addition of a small amount of milk) were somewhat less popular. Like elsewhere in Europe, legumes were the main source of protein, mainly in the form of kamy (puree of peas or beans with melted lard).

== Soups ==
The word soup was not known in Belarus until the 18th century when the nobility borrowed it from German, but soup as a type of dish clearly existed centuries earlier. The old word for most traditional Belarusian soups was polivka (поліўка), except for those named after the vegetable that was the main ingredient: kapusta (cabbage soup), buraki (beet soup), gryzhanka (swede soup). For a typical polivka the major ingredients (fish or mushrooms during fasts) were first boiled with spices; cereals such as barley or millet were boiled in the stock, and then flour blended with water, bread kvass, beet juice or buttermilk was added to the stock. Black polivka, made with goose or pork blood, is closely related to the Swedish svartsoppa. Offering a matchmaker black polivka was the polite way for the bride's parents to decline a young man's proposal. Like the Ukrainians, Russians and the Poles, Belarusians are fond of borscht, a thick and rich beet and cabbage soup made with grains, potato, and meat. Soups are much more authentic, both hot (shchi, borscht, sorrel soup) and especially cold sour soups, which provide cooling relief during the hot summer.

The Belarusian khaladnik (халаднік), a cold borscht made of beets, beet leaves or sorrel and served with sour cream, hard-boiled eggs, and boiled potatoes, has been a popular dish also in Polish and Lithuanian cuisines since the late 18th century.

Garbuzok is a popular pumpkin soup.

== Meat ==
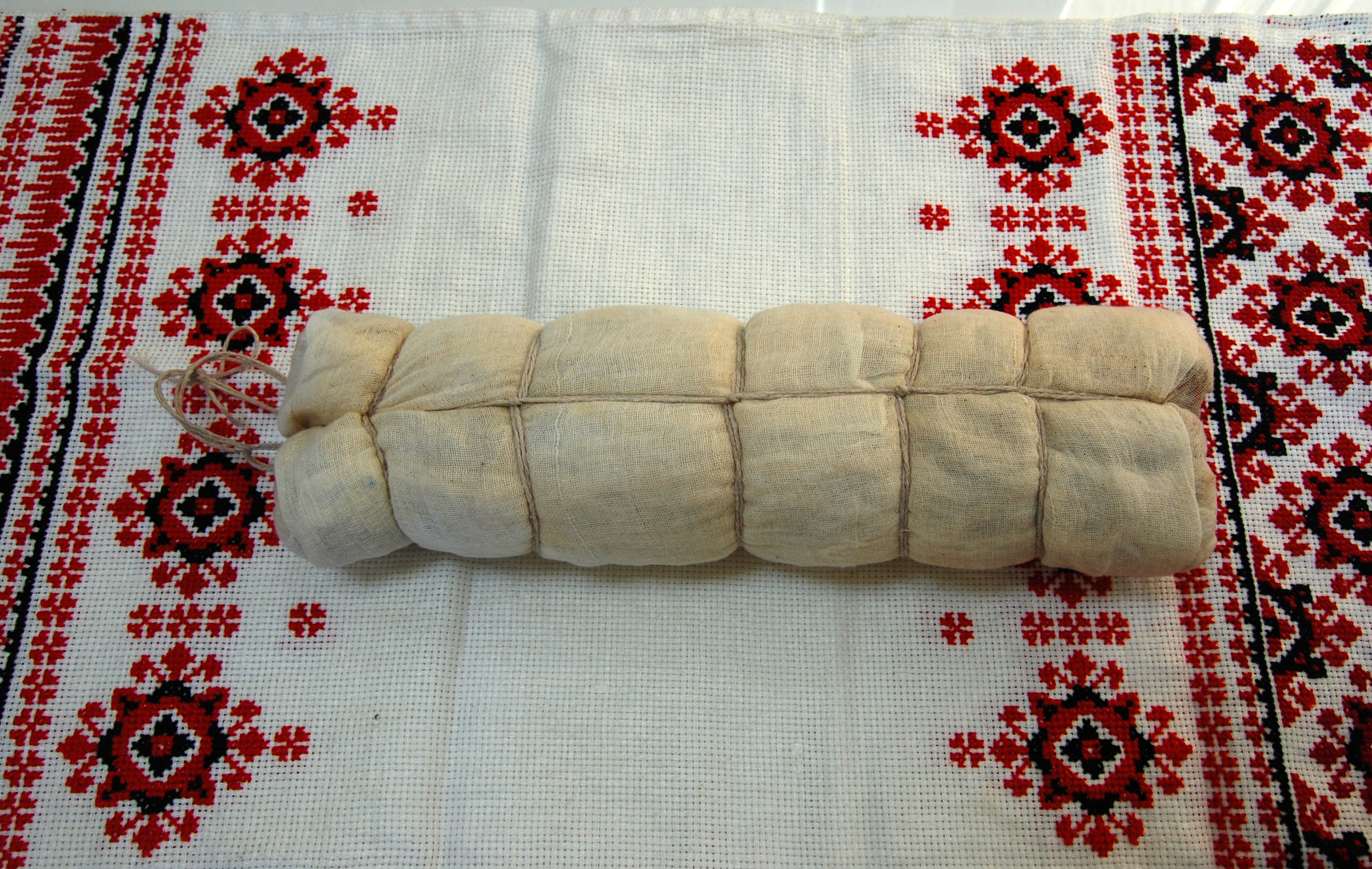
Wrapped palyandvitsa

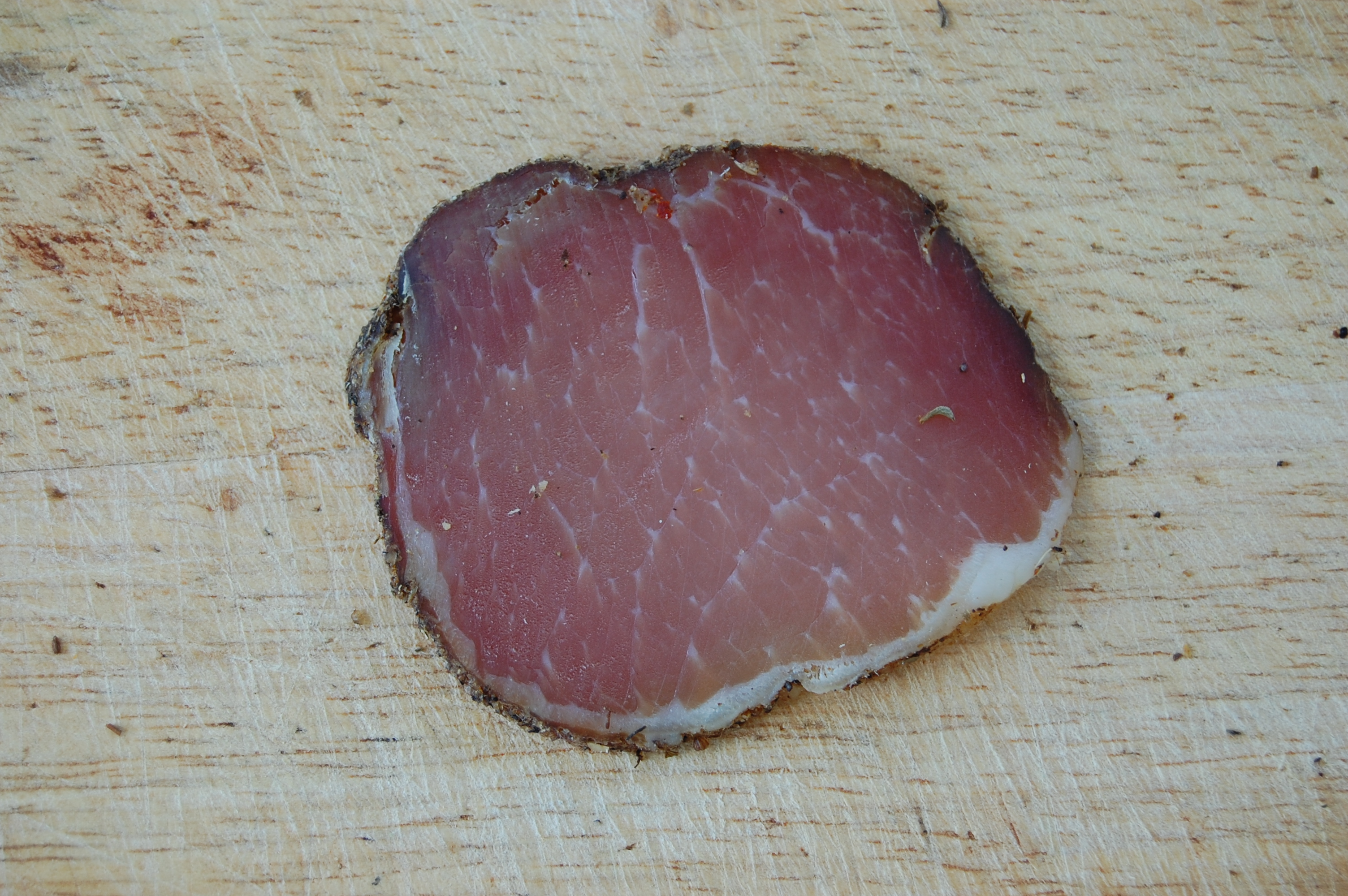
Sliced palyandvitsa

Meat was in rather scarce supply for most people, and was primarily eaten only on the main Christian holidays. Avid consumers of pork, Belarusians are less partial to mutton and beef. Most common was raw pork sausage – a pig intestine stuffed with minced or chopped meat seasoned with salt, pepper, and garlic. Its common name, "finger-stuffed sausage" (каўбаса, «пальцам пханая», or in short, пальцоўка), provided a graphic description of the primitive production technology. Kishkа (Belarusian: кішка), or kryvianka (крывянка), was a local blood sausage (крывяная каўбаса) made of pig's blood and buckwheat grain. Shkalondza (шкалондза), or kindziuk (кіндзюк), a particular kind of round sausage made of pig stomach filled with pork minced with spices – a relative of the Lithuanian skilandis – was known throughout the country. Borrowed from Italian cuisine by nobility in the 16th century, cold meat rolls, salcesons and balerons were common to all of society by the 19th century, and are still very popular. Smoked goose breast pauguski (паўгускі), a local Belarusian and Lithuanian delicacy, was once the pride of middle-class cuisine, but no longer exists today.

Verashchaka (верашчака), an 18th-century thick meat gravy with pieces of meat and sausage used as a dip or sauce for thick pancakes, is still one of the most popular specialties of Belarusian restaurants today, although it is now generally called machanka (мачанка). Also popular are zrazy, chopped pieces of beef rolled into a sausage shape and filled with vegetables, mushrooms, eggs, or potato. Pork dishes are usually fried or stewed, garnished with cheese or mushrooms. Beef steaks are also quite frequent, but mutton, once very popular, is almost entirely limited to Caucasian and Central Asian restaurants, although some still eat it today.

Salo is also commonly eaten. Consisting of cured slabs of pork fat, it is often taken on trips as a snack or eaten cooked.

== Dumplings ==
Kalduny, small boiled dumplings related to Russian pelmeni and Italian ravioli, were produced in a wide array of combinations of dough, filling and sauce. Especially popular were kalduny Count Tyshkevich, filled with a mixture of fried local mushrooms and smoked ham. In the late 19th century, kalduny began to be made with grated potato rather than with a flour-based dough and the former large variety of fillings shrank considerably. Today, kalduny have to struggle vigorously to regain their former popularity, now overtaken by the Russian pelmeni.

== Dairy foods ==
The main dairy foods include a kind of fresh white cheese (тварог) and sour cream (смятана), which is widely used both in cooking and as a garnish. Only in the mid-19th century was fermented cheese (сыр) borrowed from the Netherlands and Switzerland, and the local version of Edam was very popular for decades in the Russian Empire. Sour butter from the former Dzisna county was exported to Britain, where it continued to be the most expensive variety up to World War I.

== Beverages ==
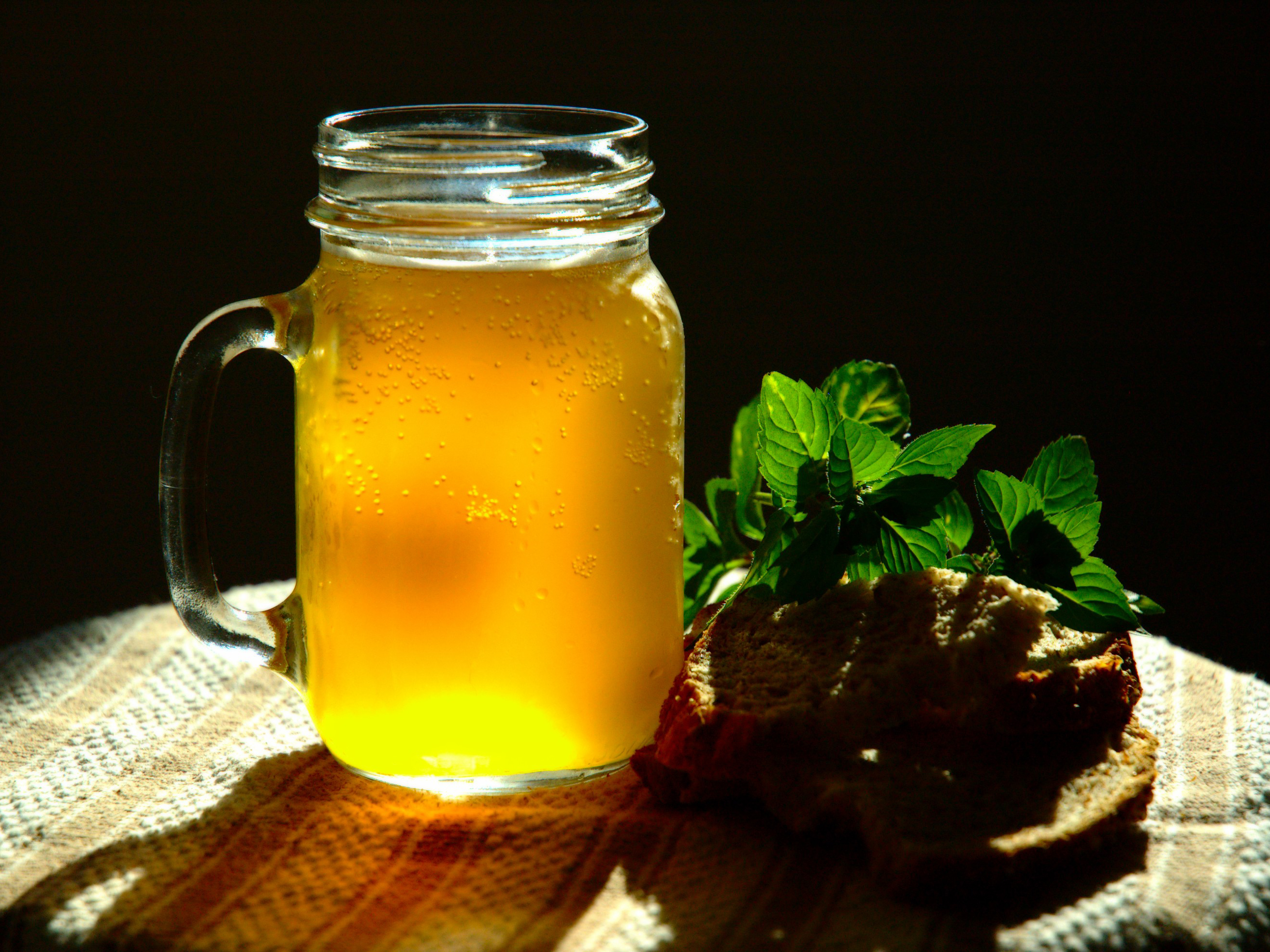
A mug of kvass, a fermented beverage made from black rye or rye bread

The traditional hard drink is vodka or harelka (гарэлка), including varieties made from birch sap (biarozavik, бярозавік) or flavored with forest herbs (zubrovka, зуброўка). Mead and similar alcoholic drinks made of honey and spices were very common up until the 19th century and then more or less disappeared until the latest revival of the national cuisine. A notable example in this group is krambambula (крамбамбуля), vodka diluted with water, mixed with honey, and flavored with spices (nutmeg, cinnamon, cloves, red and black pepper). In the 18th century, this drink competed with French champagne in Belarus and only wealthy people could afford it. Today it is enjoying a popular revival, as is evident from the appearance of krambambula recipes and histories on the internet.

Kvass traditionally was and still remains the main local non-alcoholic drink, although it is increasingly made with sugars and artificial flavorings rather than with genuine rye malt and natural flavorings. Kompot is also a relatively popular beverage, normally made of dried or fresh fruit, boiled, and then cooled. Every small town boasts a local variety of mineral water. Belarusians prefer carbonated water.

Тraditional liquid desserts that accompany a meal include saladukha (саладуха), a thick liquid made of rye flour and honey that was popular in the 18th century, and kissel, the traditional jelly drink of Eastern Europe made from the pulp of forest berries or cooked fruits, originally thickened with oatmeal (now replaced by potato starch flour or cornstarch).

== Minority cuisines ==
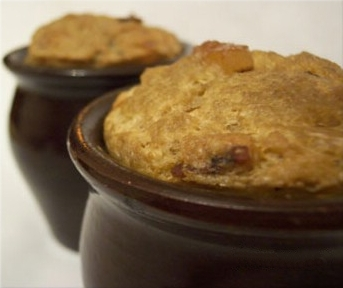
Belarusian potato babka

Belarusian cuisine owes much to Jewish cooking. In the 19th century, Jewish influence was especially noticeable in bringing in potato dishes of German origin, such as babka. This was a two-way gastronomic street, for the famous bulbe latkes, the potato pancakes of the East European Jews, may have been borrowed from the Belarusian draniki.

Another important minority ethnic group which influenced Belarusian cuisine were the Lipka Tatars, whose Tatar cuisine was especially strong in various cakes with fillings, mutton and vegetable dishes.

== Potatoes ==
Belarus is known for farming potatoes just like Ukraine is known for farming wheat. The humble potato became so common in the 19th century that there are more than 300 potato dishes recorded in Belarus and it came to be considered the core ingredient of the national cuisine. Draniki, pancakes made from grated potatoes, are often considered a "signature" national dish. Belarus is regularly ranked as the top country for potato consumption per capita, with each Belarusian consuming around 160 kg of potatoes yearly.

In the Russian Empire and the Soviet Union, Belarusians were sometimes called bulbashi, a pejorative conjugation of the Belarusian word бульба (bulba) 'potato'.

== Salads ==
Typical salads are made of a fairly short list of ingredients, combining boiled beef or chicken, potato, beet, carrot, apple, herring, diced cheese, canned peas and corn, canned fish, 'crab fingers', onions and mushrooms, generously seasoned with mayonnaise or sunflower oil. One of the most typical local salads is the Białowieża salad, which combines boiled chicken meat with fried mushrooms, onions, and pickled cucumbers, mixed with mayonnaise and garnished with chopped hard-boiled egg. Fresh vegetable salads are also widely available: tomatoes (also mixed with cucumbers) and onions seasoned with sour cream; radishes with dill and sunflower oil (or sour cream); shredded cabbage salad seasoned with sunflower oil or mayonnaise (similar to coleslaw); and pickled cabbage with caraway seeds or cranberries with onions seasoned with sunflower oil are common.

== Fish ==
Historically, Belarusians had little access to seafood, and this is still evident in the cuisine. The most common sea fish (after herring, which has been the most common appetizer all along the Baltic coast and its vicinity ever since the 14th century) are hake and cod and there are relatively few dishes with such fish. Much more traditional and common are lake fish, notably zander, cooked in a wide variety of ways, and carp (especially the famous stuffed carp, the gefilte fish of Jewish cuisine). Eels, smoked or stuffed, are the specialty of the lake country in the northwestern part of Belarus, adjacent to Latvia and Lithuania.

== Side dishes ==
Side dishes are usually boiled, fried or mashed potatoes, buckwheat kasha, rice or pasta. Meat dishes are frequently served with bliny or draniki stacked in round clay pots.
