= Creamed spinach =

Spinach in a creamy sauce

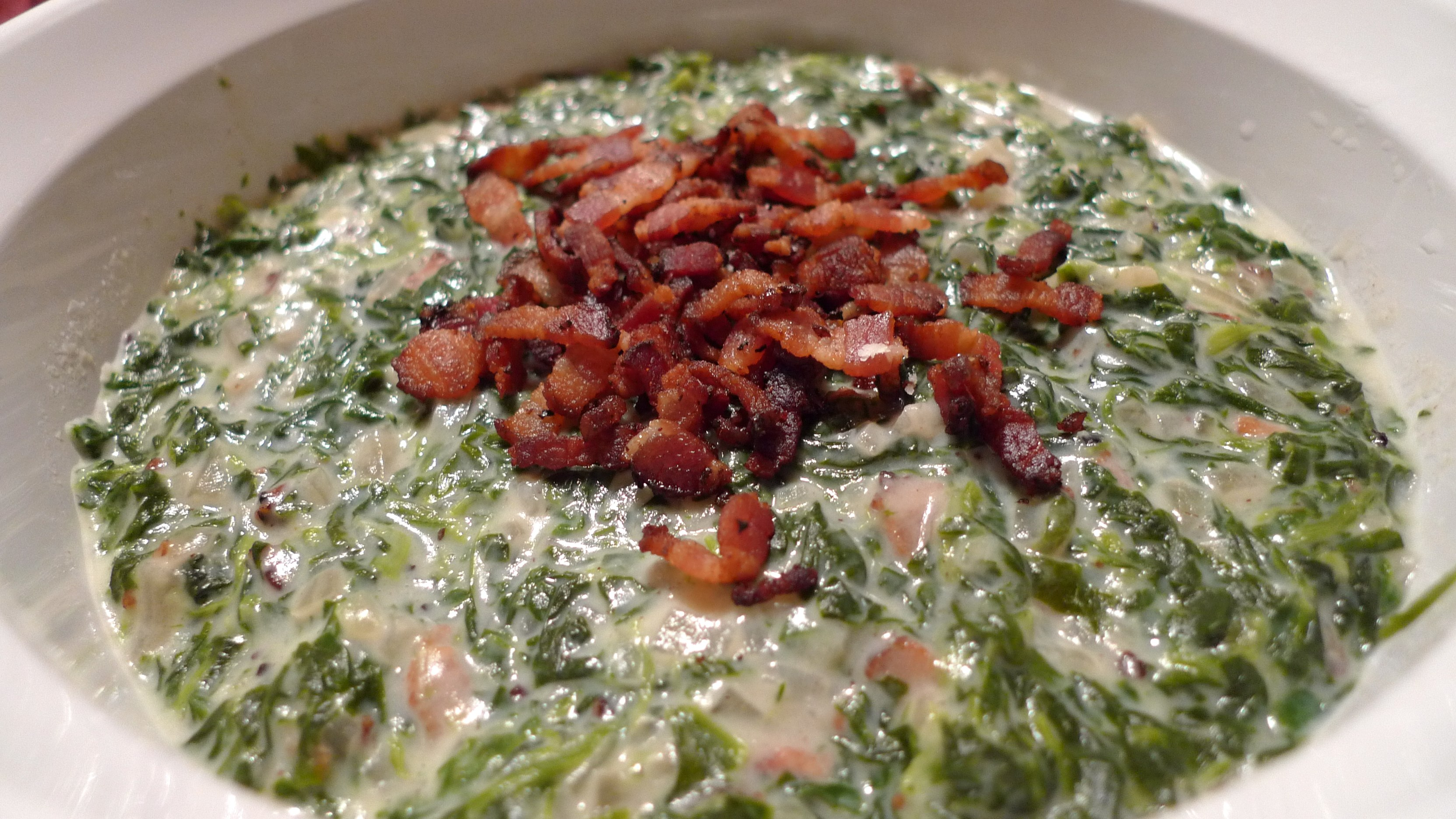
- Creamed spinach topped with bacon
- Course: Side dish
- Serving temperature: Warm
- Main ingredients: Spinach, dairy

Creamed spinach is a dish consisting of a spinach coated in a creamy sauce, which can be used as side dish or topping. It is a common side dish at steakhouses but can be found in everything from frozen TV dinners, fast casual, to gourmet restaurants and North American and European home dishes.

== Preparation ==
Celebrity cook Rachael Ray's recipe for creamed spinach in one dish uses chopped spinach, garlic, salt, pepper, cream, cheese, and a little oil prepared in a pan. French style creamed spinach or épinards a la crème has some variation but still considered creamed spinach; chef Julia Child's recipe includes spinach, butter, flour, salt, pepper, and beef stock or heavy cream, and made in a saucepan. Martha Stewart's creamed spinach recipe includes spinach, butter, onion, garlic, cream cheese, milk, ground nutmeg, salt, and pepper. The spinach is usually trimmed of the stem, cleaned, and chopped.

It can also be part of another more complicated recipe, for example in Oreilles d'âne layers of crepes or in a more modern version lasagna pasta or crouzet (see crozets de Savoie) are placed in alternating layers with creamed spinach and grated cheese. It is also used in eggs Sardou for example, the New Orleans classic. Creamed spinach has been suggested a component of Beef Wellington.

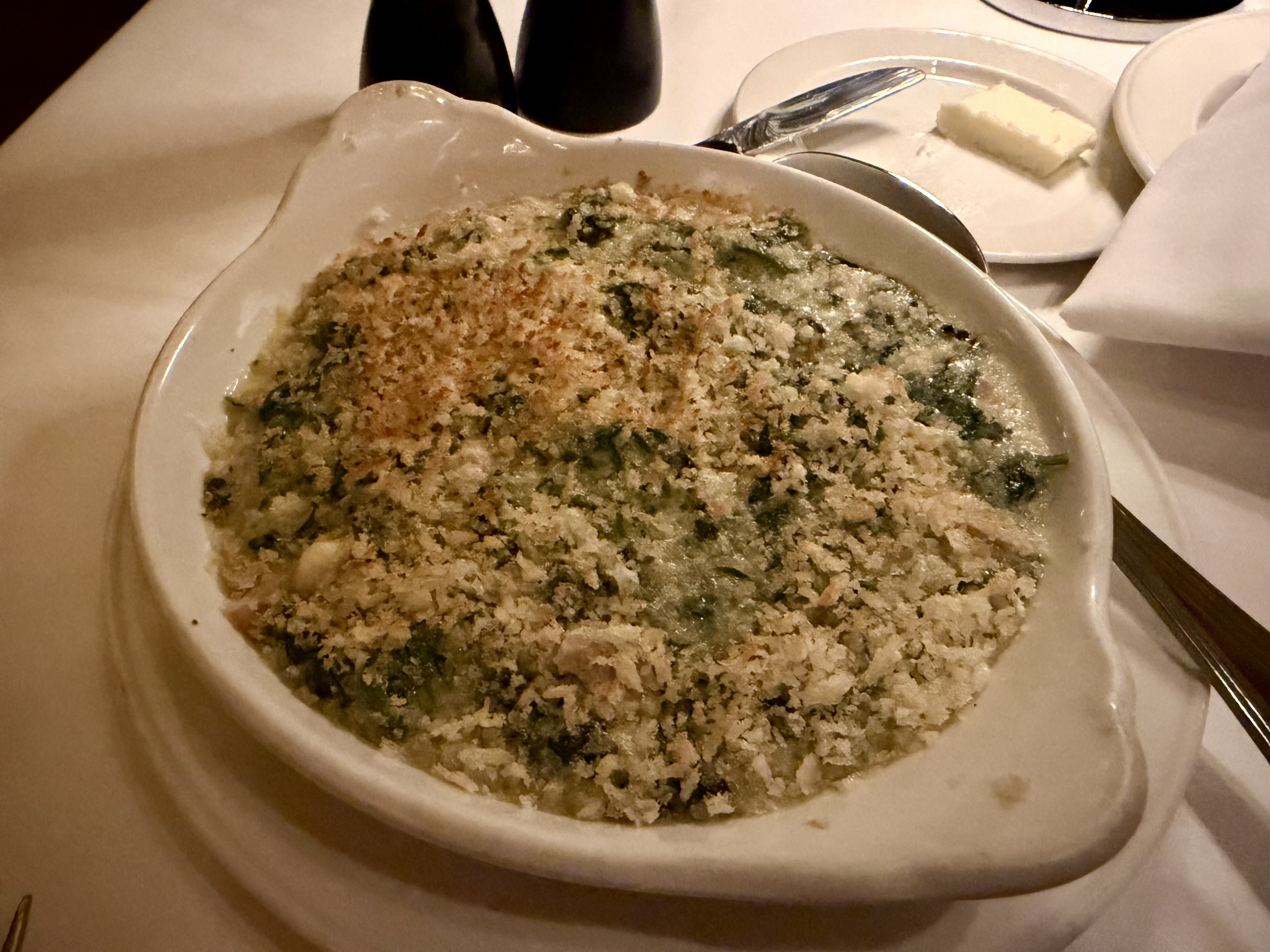
Creamed spinach at Pappas Bros. Steakhouse in Houston, Texas

There are other creamed greens dishes, such as creamed kale, but the dish potage creme d’epinards (cream of spinach soup) is a different dish.

Suggestions as to the popularity of the dish note that the cream balances the bitterness of the spinach, it adds color to a plate, and is relatively healthy containing vitamins A, C, and K, iron, calcium, and fiber although some recipes can have considerable fat content.

Steakhouses that serve creamed spinach, usually with their own special recipe, include Ruth's Chris, Strip House, and Benjamin's Steakhouse. Recipes vary and some do not contain actual dairy cream. A famous restaurant in Chicago known to serve creamed spinach is The Berghoff founded in 1898. Creamed spinach is served at the oldest steakhouse in the US, Old Homestead Steakhouse in New York City founded in 1868.

Creamed spinach is also served by NASA on spaceflights.

== Gallery ==
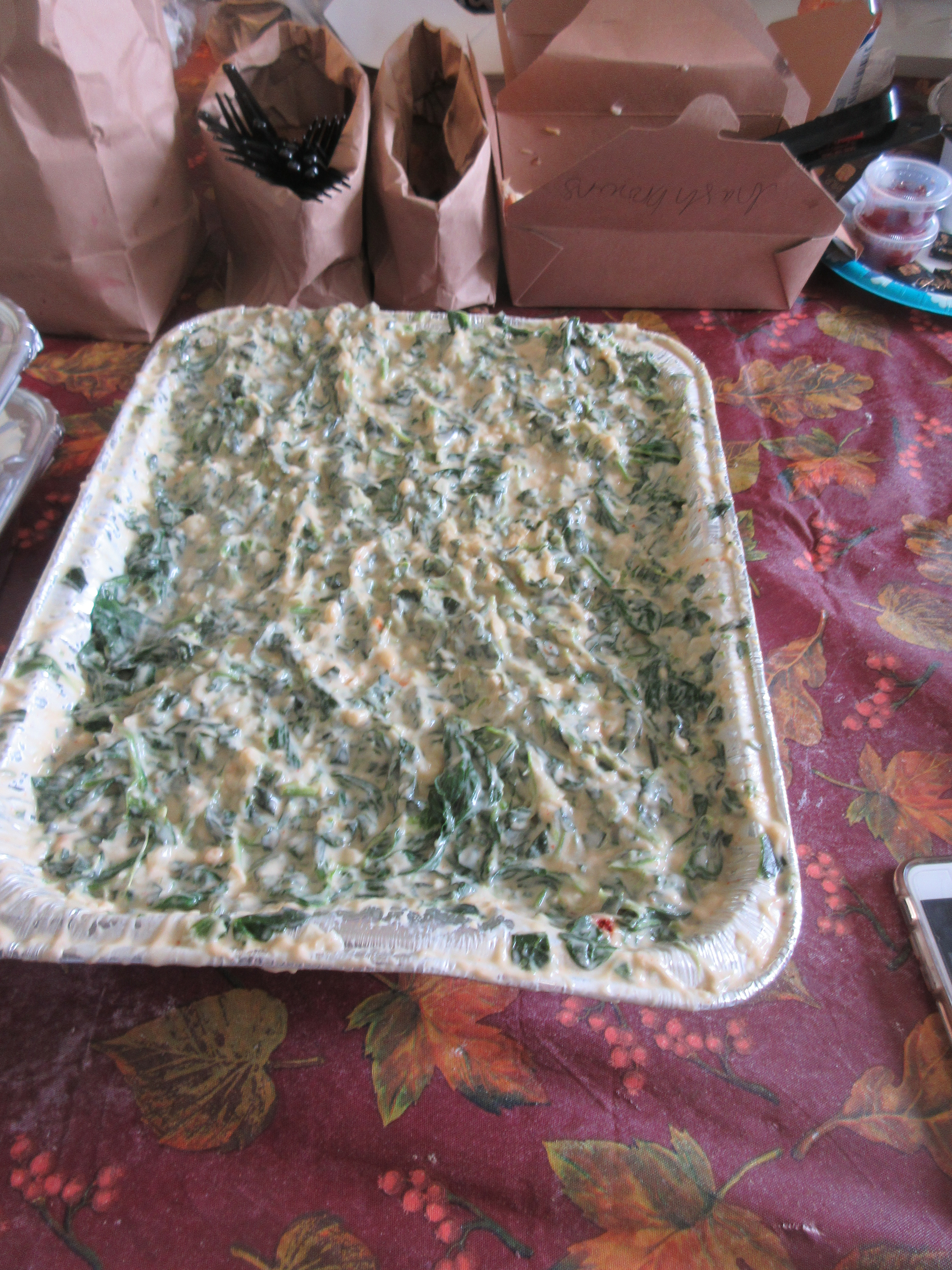
Tray of creamed spinach

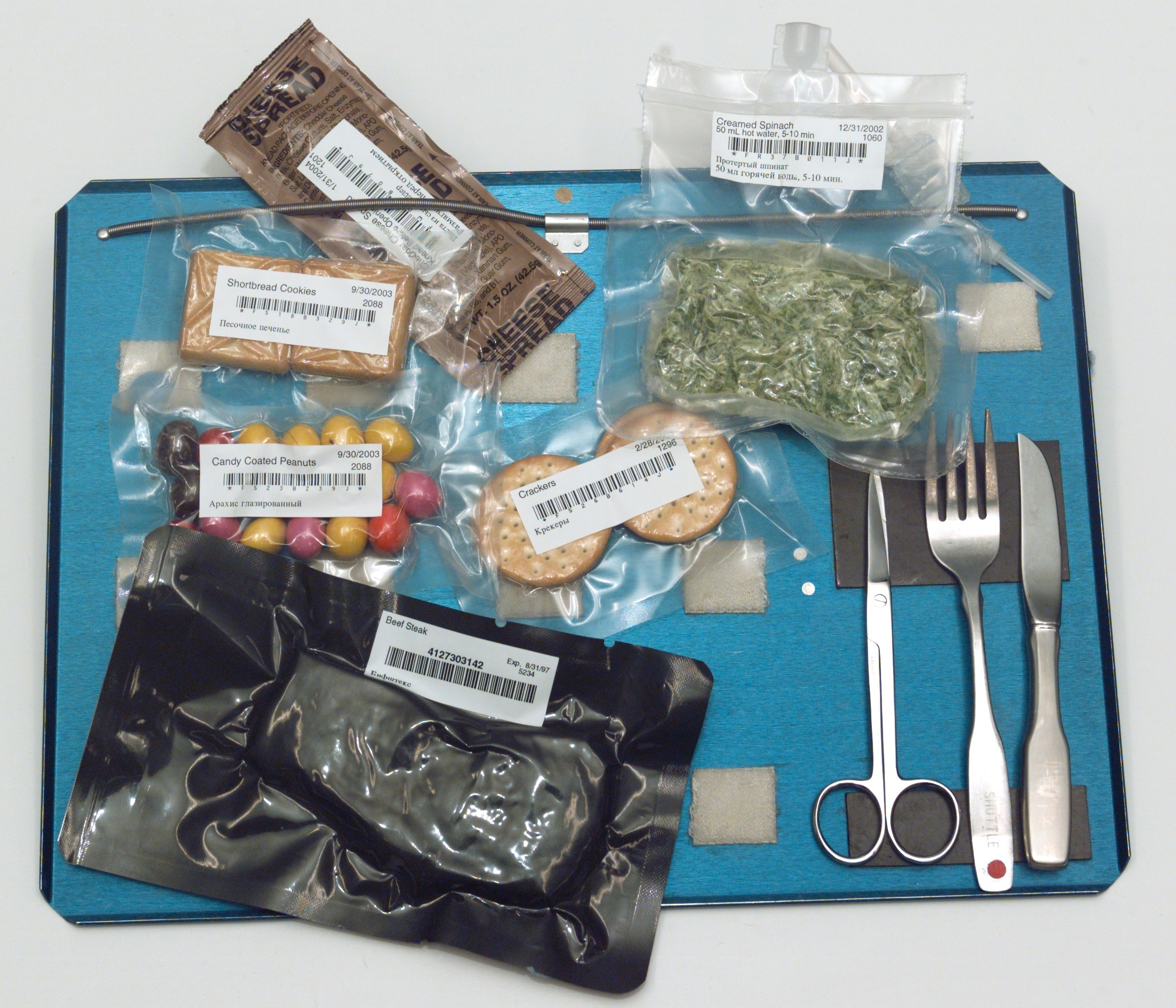
Creamed spinach as space food for NASA spaceflights

== See also ==
- Spinach soup
- Spinach dip
- Creaming (cooking)
- Creamed corn
- Green bean casserole
- Cream of mushroom soup
- Palak paneer (Indian dish with pureed spinach, cheese, spices)
- Thanksgiving dinner
