= Crozet =

Crozet may refer to:

- Crozet Islands, a sub-Antarctic archipelago of small islands in the southern Indian Ocean
- Crozet, Ain, a commune in the Ain department in eastern France
- Claudius Crozet (1789–1864), soldier, educator, and civil engineer
- Crozet, Virginia, a census-designated place in Albemarle County in the United States
- Crozets de Savoie, small, square-shaped, flat pasta
