= Kasseler =

Kasseler may refer to:

- Kassler, a smoked and salted cut of pork in German cuisine
- A native of Kassel, Germany
- Johann Heinrich Tischbein, a German painter nicknamed "The Kasseler"
