= Flomaria =

Pasta

flomaria
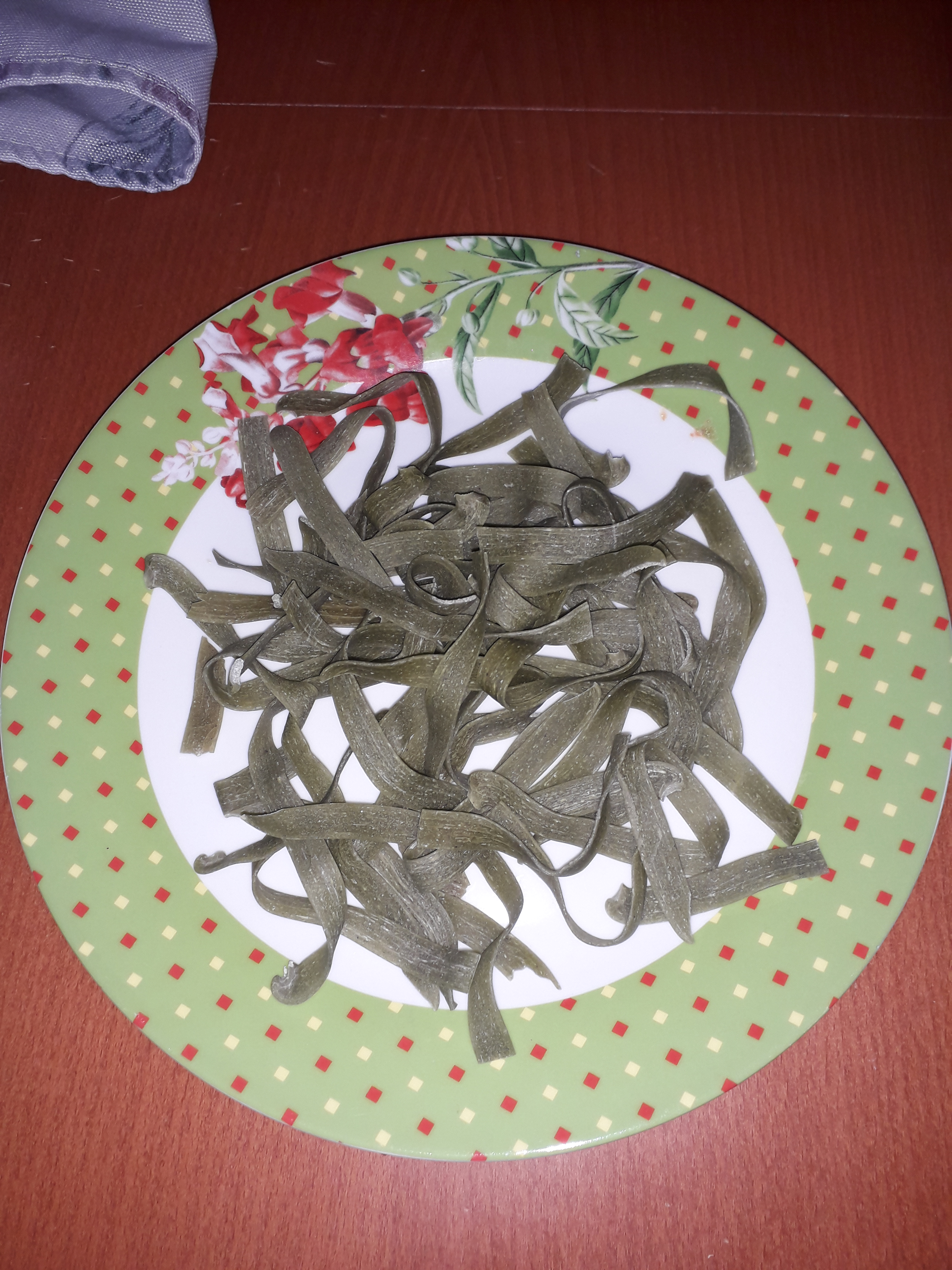
- Flomaria with spinach
- Type: Pasta
- Place of origin: Greece
- Region or state: Lemnos
- Associated cuisine: Greek cuisine
- Main ingredients: hard wheat flour, eggs, milk, salt
- Variations: hilopites

Flomaria (Greek: φλωμάρια) is a traditional pasta made on the island of Lemnos. They are made from flour, eggs, milk, and salt. They are made adding egg, such as hilopites, but their size is longer.

It is used also for a traditional recipe of the island; rooster with flomaria.

== Sources ==
- tasteatlas.com
