= Hilopites =

Greek pasta food dish

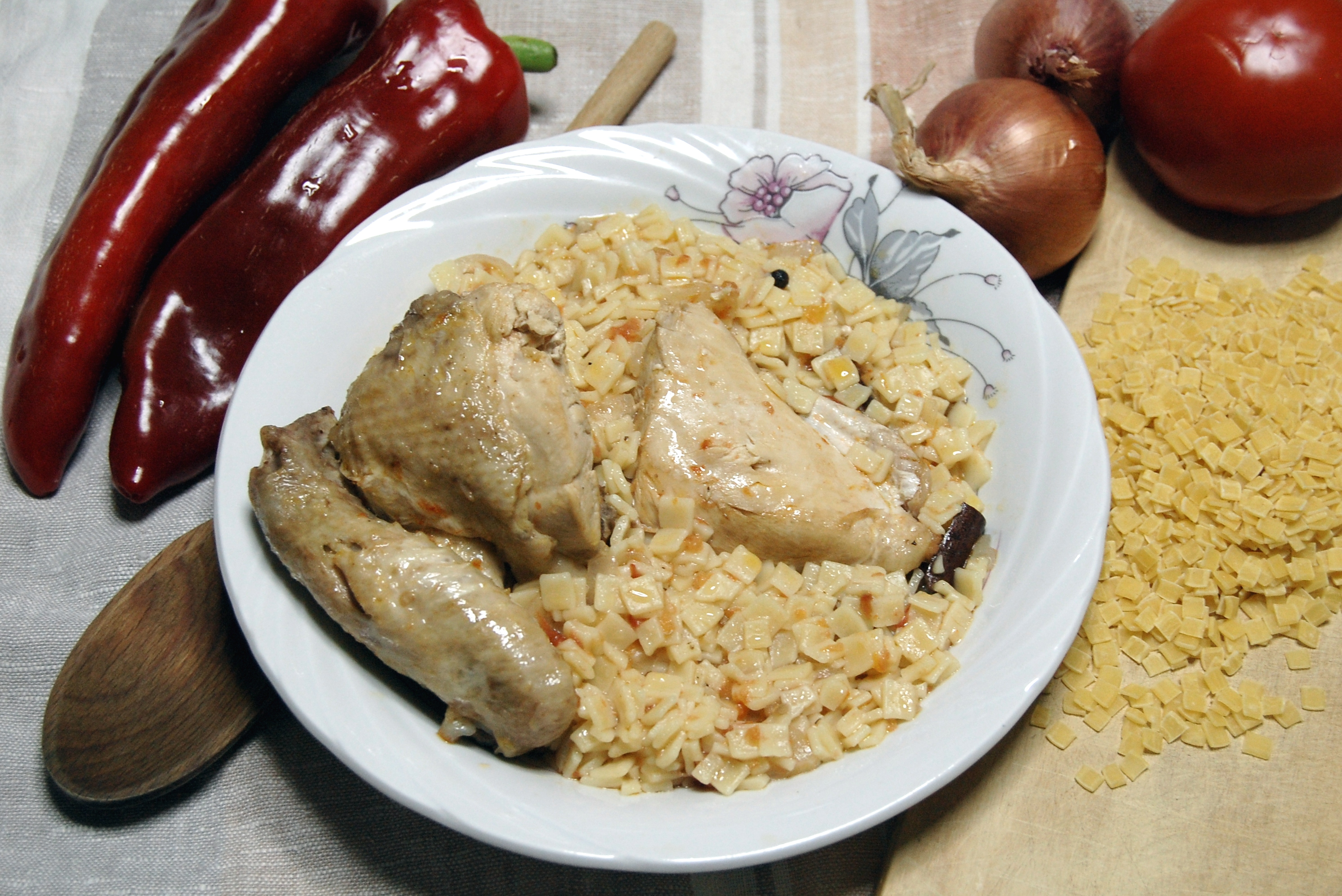
- Chicken with hilopites
- Alternative names: Toutoumákia
- Type: Pasta
- Place of origin: Greece
- Main ingredients: Flour, eggs, milk, and salt

Hilopites (alternatively hylopites or Chylopites) (Greek: χυλοπίτες, [çiloˈpites]) are a traditional Greek pasta made from flour, eggs, milk, and salt. They take the form of long thin strips or, in some regions, small squares (sometimes called by different names).

The pasta is traditionally made by rolling the dough out in to a thin sheet, dusting with flour, and slicing twice: first into thin fettuccine-like strips, then again into small squares. While commercially produced hilopites are generally around 1 cm^{2} (0.16 in^{2}) traditional homemade hilopites are often made much larger.

Other regional names for this pasta include τουτουμάκια (toutoumákia) in some regions of Peloponnisos and τουμάτσια (toumátsia) in Cyprus.

Some common dishes made with hilopites are rooster with red wine sauce, chicken noodle soups, baked chicken with red sauce, or simple boiled pasta with oil and cheese.

== See also ==
- Flomaria
- Crozets de Savoie
- Lazanki
- List of pasta
