= Diot =

French pork sausage

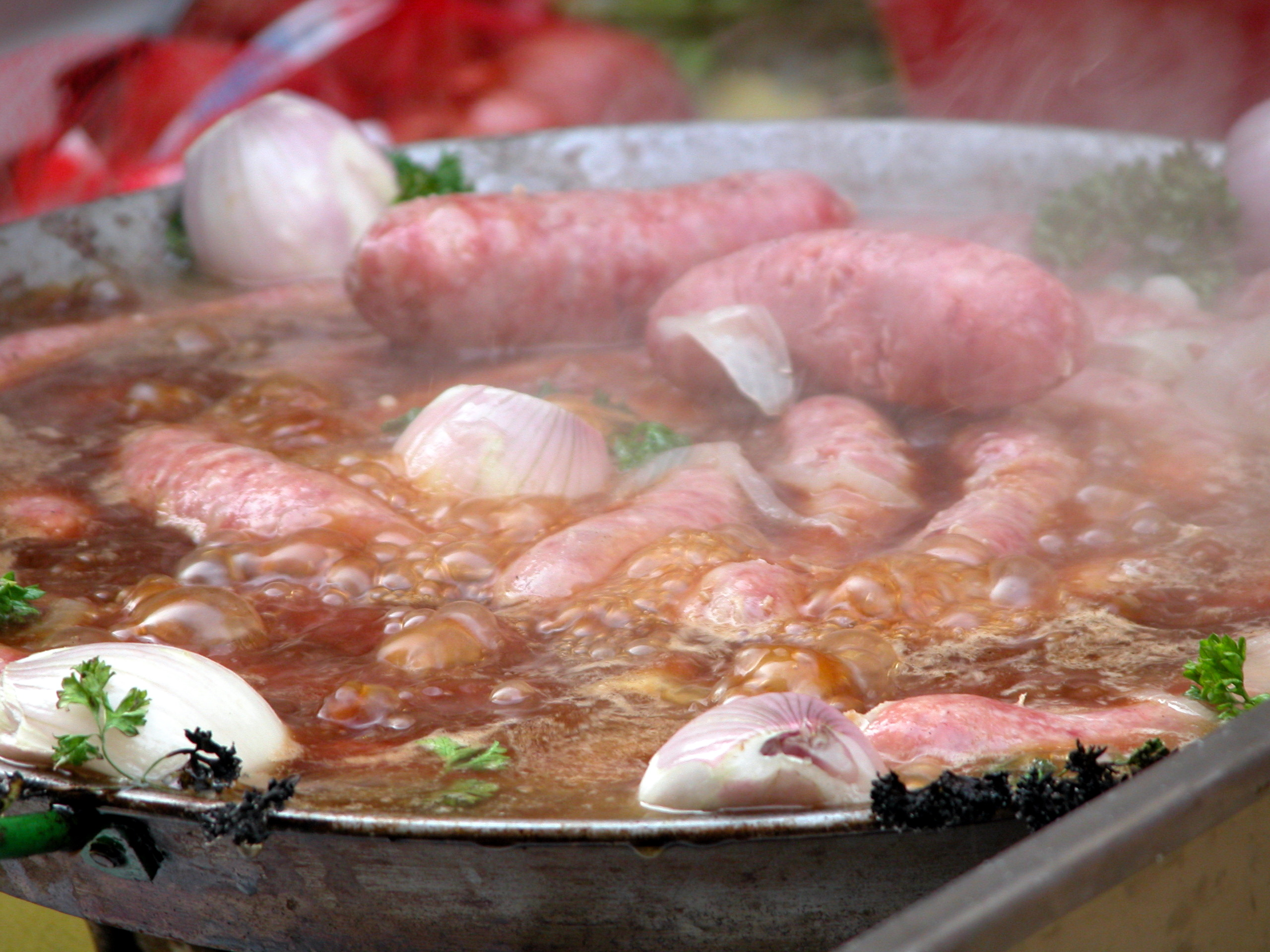
A dish made with diots

A diot is a vegetable and pork sausage from the French region of Savoy (La Savoie). Diots are usually made from fatty ground pork, seasoned with salt, pepper and nutmeg. They may also contain cheese or cabbage. Some are dried, similarly to saucissons.

Diots may be eaten cold or hot. In the most popular preparation, diots au vin blanc, the sausages are boiled with garlic and onions in white wine. They may also be browned in lard beforehand.

When eaten hot, diots are usually served with boiled potatoes, polenta, or the buckwheat pasta Crozets de Savoie. When eaten cold they are generally covered with spicy mustard (preferably from Dijon), or placed in sandwiches or salads.
