= Lazanki =

Traditional dish with large flat pasta

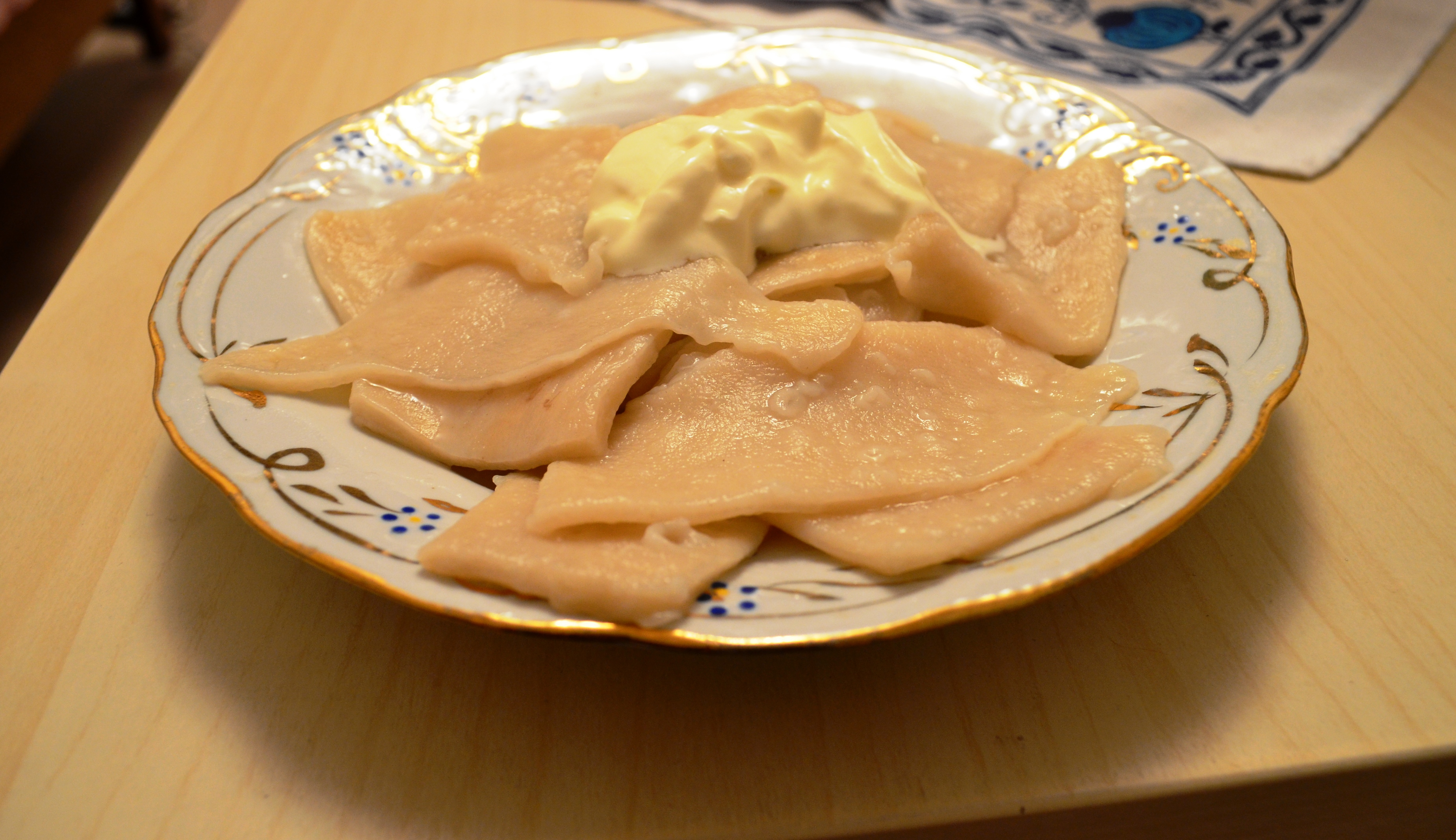
- A plate of skryliai with grietinė
- Alternative names: лазанкі, лазанки, łazanki, skryliai, лазанки
- Type: Pasta
- Place of origin: Central and Eastern Europe

Lazanki (Belarusian: лазанкі, Russian: лазанки, Polish: łazanki [waˈzaŋ.ki], singular łazanka or łazanek, Lithuanian: skryliai, Ukrainian: лазанки) is a Polish, Russian, Lithuanian and Belarusian type of pasta.

It consists of wheat, rye or buckwheat dough which is rolled thin and cut into triangles or rectangles. These are boiled, drained, and eaten with melted pork fat, vegetable oil and often sour cream. In Poland, they are commonly mixed with fried cabbage or with soured cabbage and small pieces of sausage, meat and mushrooms.

== History ==
Lazanki has been known in Poland since the early Middle Ages, then also in the Polish–Lithuanian Commonwealth. Its older name variant is laga or laganki meaning most likely a stick, a strip, or a wooden stick. The name probably derives from elongated strips cut from flattened dough, or from las/laska, meaning a wooden stick. Another source says the name comes from the ancient Polish/Slavic word las, meaning forests, as the original lazanki were cooked with the addition of meat, mushrooms, which were obtained from the forests. Later versions of lazanki include sauerkraut and cheese. Modern versions of this dish differ only slightly from its original version.

Some sources tell another story about lazanki; when Bona Sforza d’Aragona married into Polish royalty and became queen of Poland and Duchess of Lithuania in the 16th century, her Italian cooks fused dishes from Polish and Italian cuisines.

According to an alternative etymology, the Polish name łazanki derives ultimately from the Italian word lasagne, a name for a type of pasta which, like typical lazanki, is also rectangular in shape, except much larger.

== See also ==
- Crozets de Savoie
- Hilopites
- List of buckwheat dishes
- List of pasta
- List of pasta dishes
