= Baleron =

Smoked pork neck cut

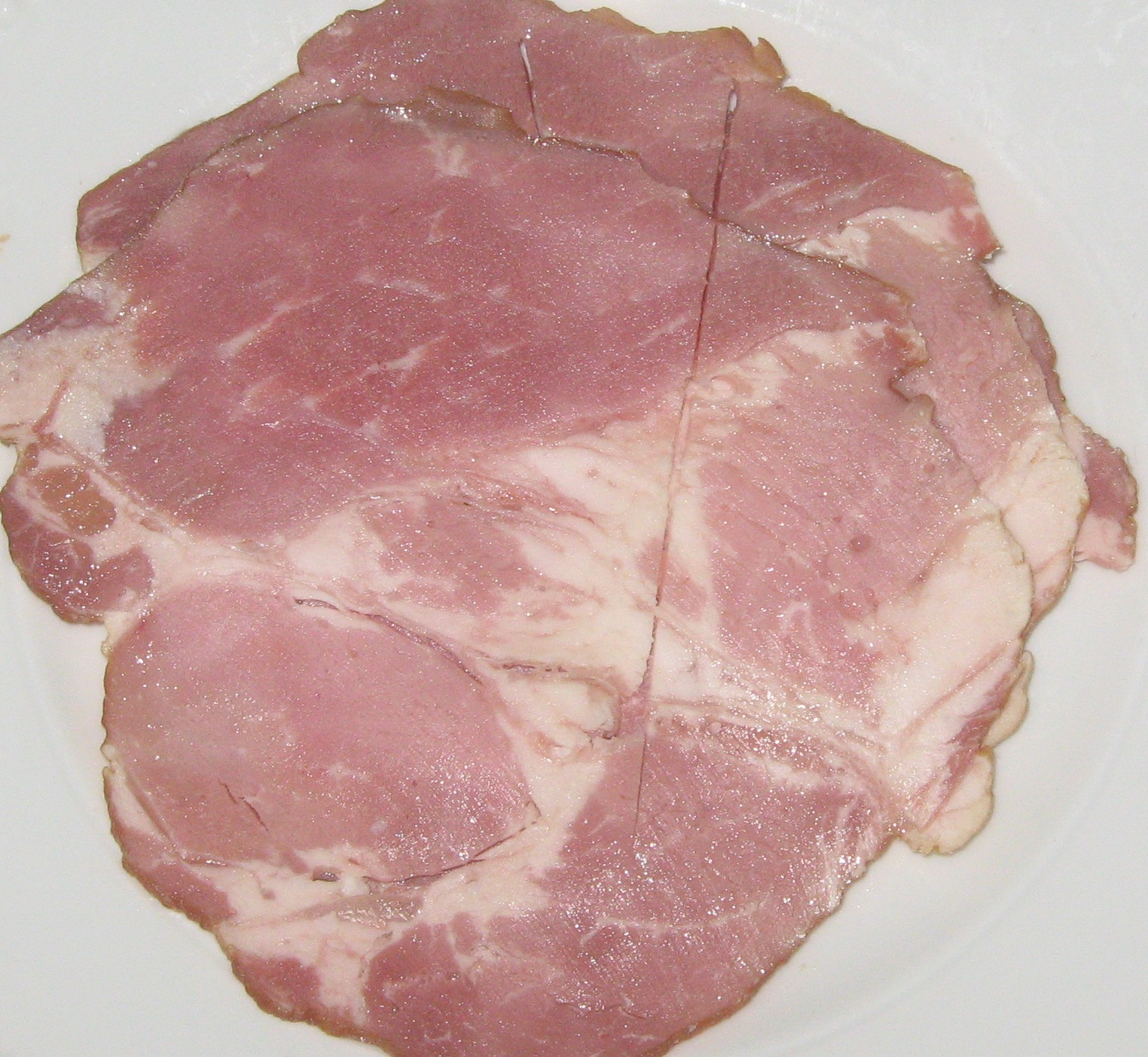
Baleron slice

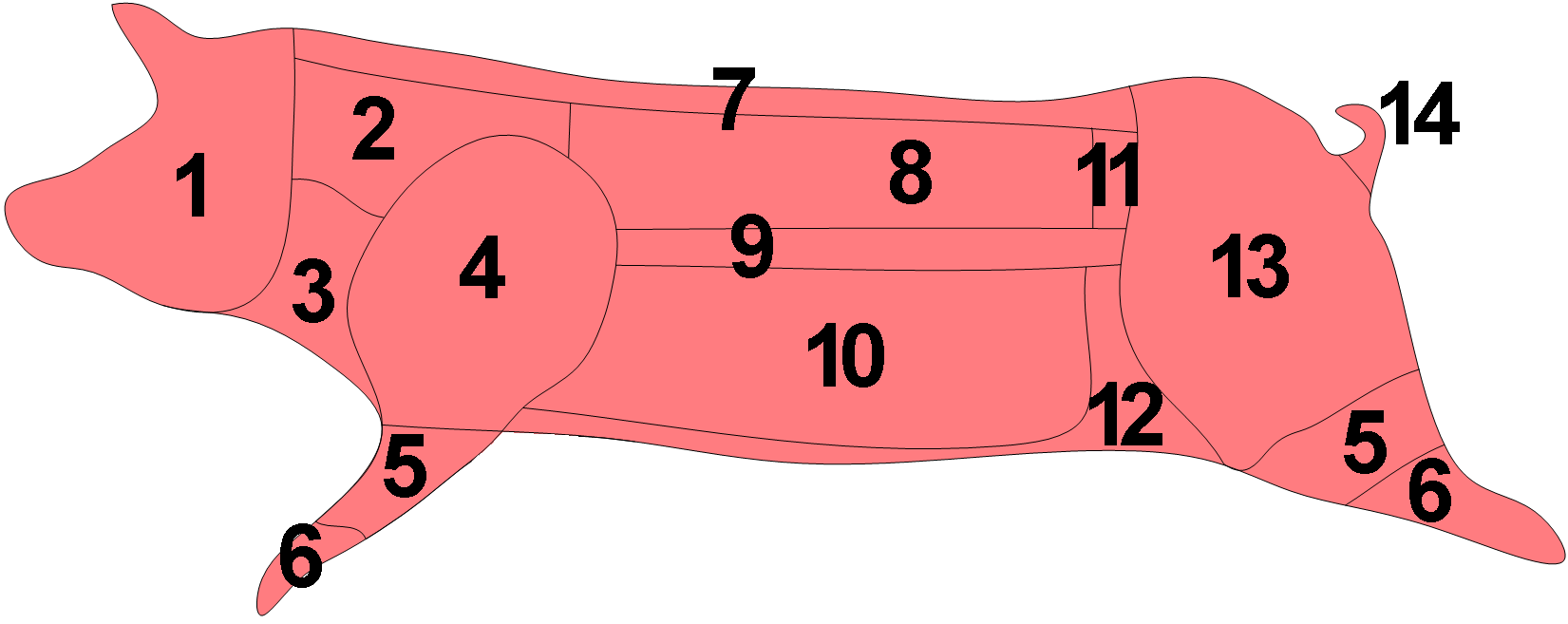
Polish cuts of pork. Pork neck is cut #2

British cuts of pork, for comparison

In Polish cuisine, baleron is a cold cut from cured and smoked boneless pork neck After ham, baleron is the second most valued cold cut in Poland.

== Preparation ==
The Encyclopedia of Meat Sciences summarizes its preparation as follows. It is dry-cured, then immersed in the brine for 8–10 days, then drained, stuffed in a casing, smoked in warm smoke, cooked, and cooled. The cross-section of the final product is marbled meat. Polish sources describe a more complicated process.

== Etymology ==
pronunciation

Older Polish dictionaries derived the word from the French word paleron for chuck steak. Newer dictionaries derive it from German Ballen-rolle.

== Registered products ==
Several balerons are registered as protected traditional food by the Ministry of Agriculture and Rural Development:

- 2008: Smoked baleron from Masurian butcher shops
- 2008: Baleron nadwieprzański (baleron from the Wieprz River area)
- 2014: Smoked baleron from Proszówki
- 2016: Smoked baleron from Wisznice
  Quote: "Meat from pork neck (after removing the bones), cured, placed in a bladder and smoked, brown in color with a shade of dark cherry, dark pink in cross-section, slightly juicy consistency, soft, salty taste. Smoked necessarily in a smokehouse fired with alder wood."
- 2019: Baleron from Płock

== See also ==
- Pork butt
- Kassler
- List of smoked foods
