= Kassler =

German pork dish

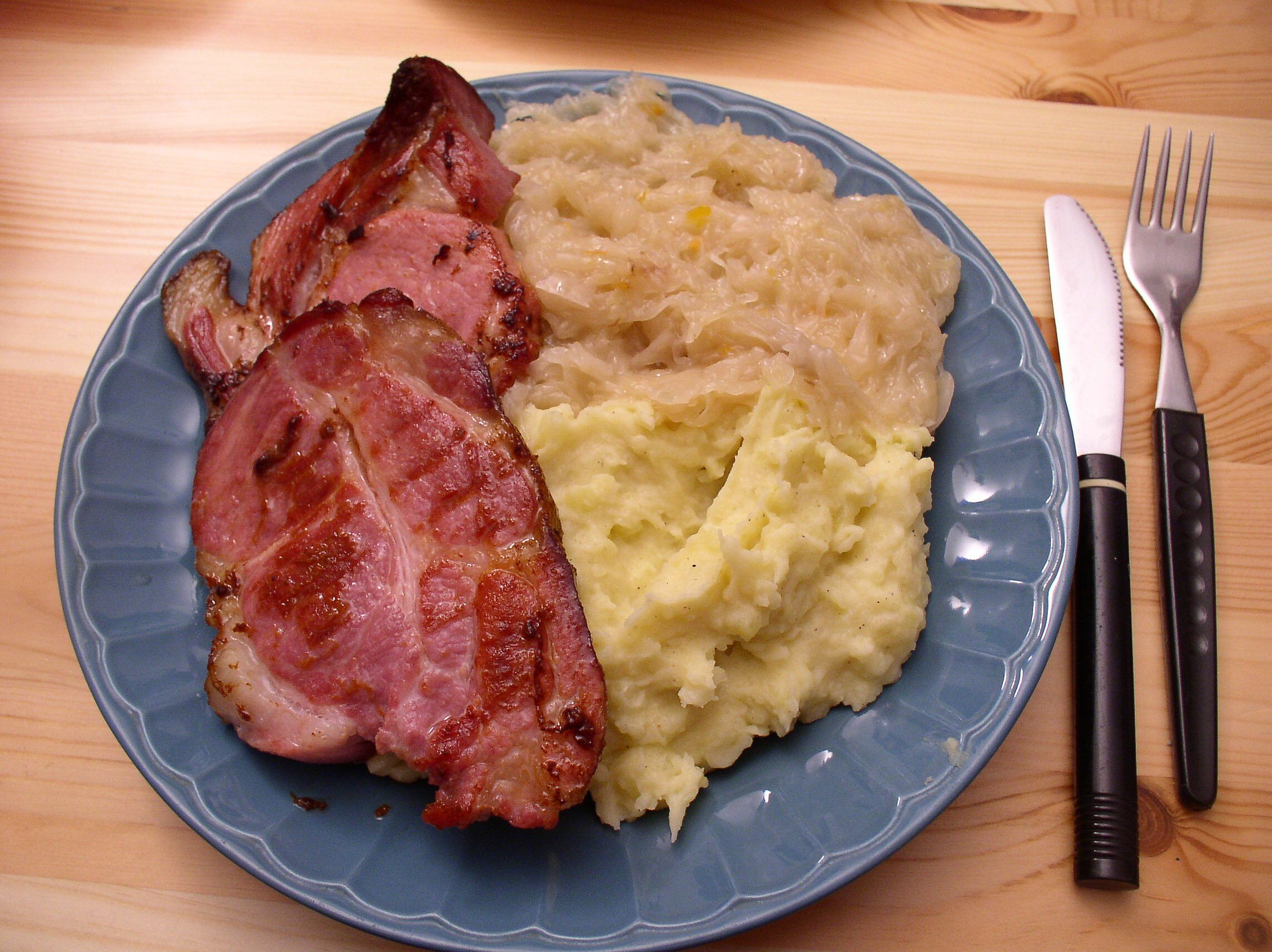
Kassler served with sauerkraut and mashed potatoes.

Kassler (German: [ˈkaslɐ]) or Kasseler in German cuisine is a cured and slightly smoked cut of pork similar to gammon. It can be either hot or cold smoked. Pork necks and loins are the most often used cuts although ribs, shoulders and bellies can also be used. It is often served either with sauerkraut and mashed potatoes or with kale and roasted potatoes.

In addition to pork, chicken prepared 'Kasseler' style is available at some butchers.

== History ==
It is unclear where the name comes from. It is often said that the name derived from a Berlin-based butcher called Cassel who prepared the cut in the late 19th century. However, records of the town's inhabitants show that in the 19th century no butcher named Cassel or Kassel was living in Berlin. Likewise, it is not possible to prove that Kasseler comes from the German town Kassel.

== In Other Cultures ==
In Sweden, kassler usually consists of hot smoked pork loin that is eaten as is or slightly fried.

In Finland, pork neck of any type is known as kassler.

In The Netherlands, a cold, thinly sliced version to be used in sandwiches is widely available under the name "casselerrib" as a variety on ham.

A similar dish, hamburgerryg, is eaten in Denmark. In this variation the meat is boiled. It is often served with a glaze of honey and mustard. In Norway, hamburgerrygg is smoked, while the unsmoked variant is called benfri svinekam. In Iceland, hamborgarhryggur is a traditional Christmas dinner.

Also a similar dish, baleron, is eaten in Poland.

== See also ==
- List of smoked foods
