= Crozets de Savoie =

Small flat square-shaped pasta

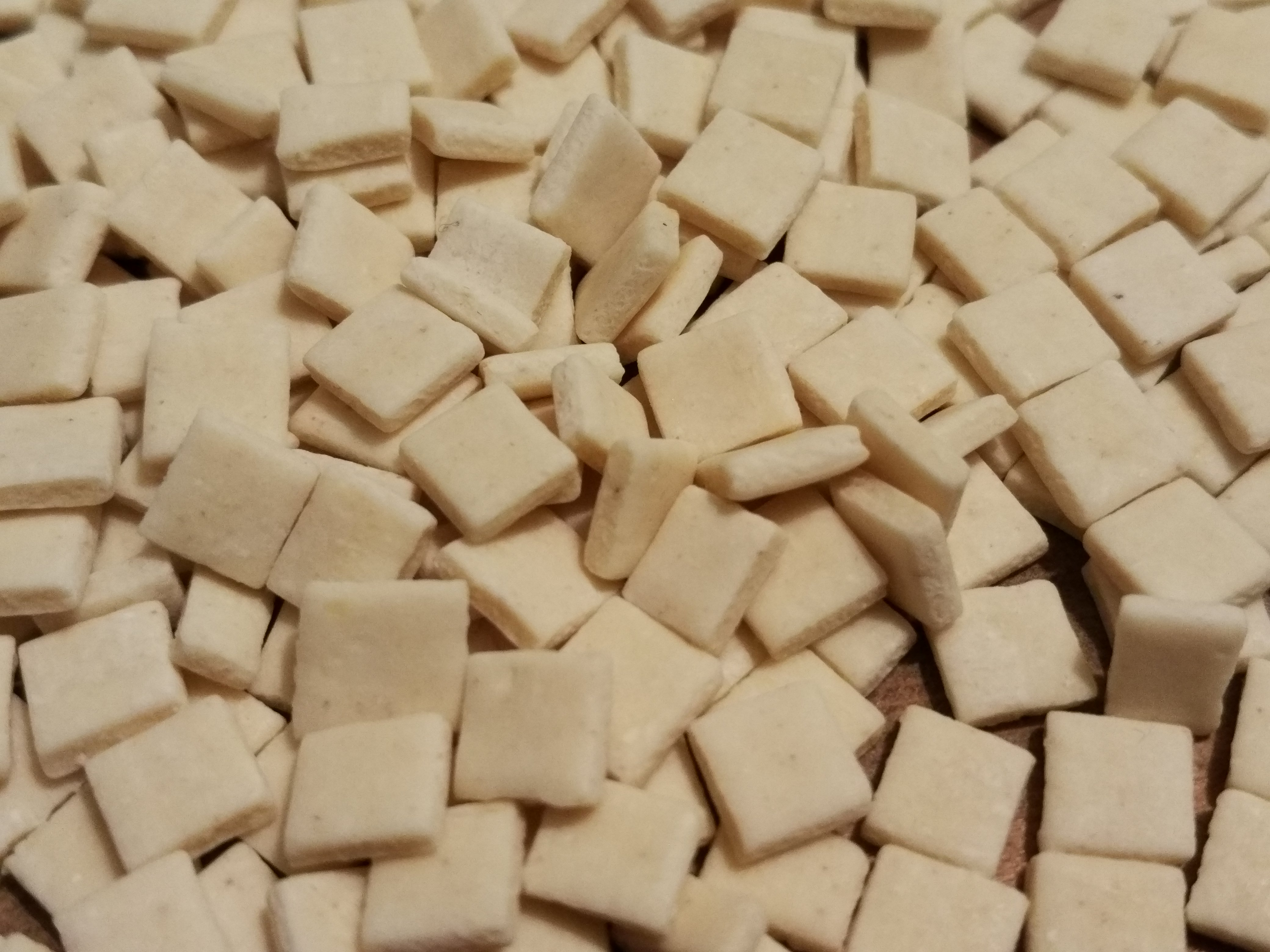
- Alternative names: Crozets savoyards
- Type: Pasta
- Place of origin: France
- Region or state: Savoie
- Main ingredients: Buckwheat or wheat

Crozets de Savoie are small, square-shaped, flat pasta originally made in the Savoie region in southeast France. Crozets were made traditionally at home by housewives using buckwheat or wheat, or sometimes both. This pasta is used mainly to prepare two regional dishes, the croziflette (a variant of tartiflette) and crozets with diots (traditional Savoyard sausage).

== History ==
The name crozet comes from the Arpitian word croé, which means 'little'.

== See also ==
- Hilopites
- Lazanki
- List of buckwheat dishes
- List of pasta
- List of pasta dishes

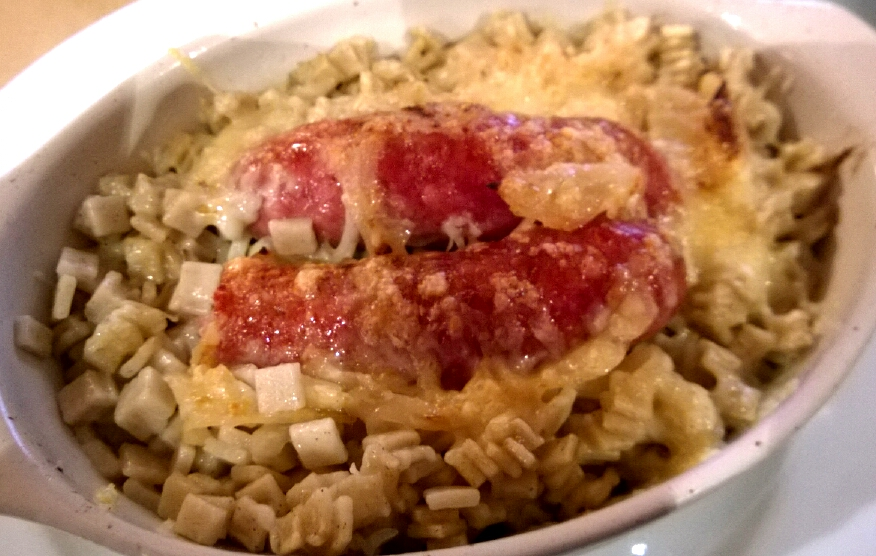
Diots aux crozets
