= Oriental melon =

Melon cultivar

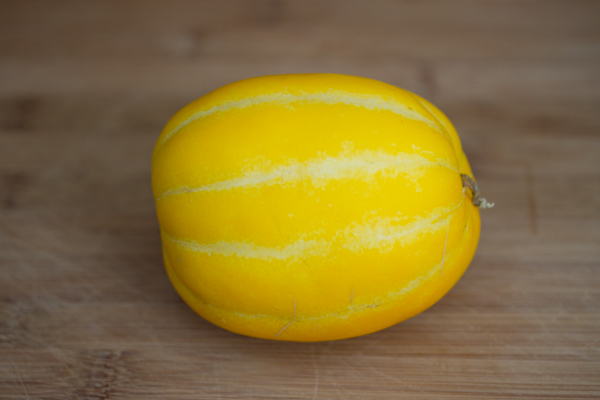
- Species: Cucumis melo
- Cultivar group: Makuwa

The oriental melon (Cucumis melo Makuwa Group) is a group of Cucumis melo cultivars that are produced in East Asia. Phylogenetic studies tracing the genetic lineage of the plant suggest that it may have originated in eastern India, having then spread to China over the Silk Road, from which it was introduced to Korea and Japan. Its flavour has been described as a cross between a honeydew melon and a cucumber. It is noticeably less sweet than Western varieties of melon, and consists of about 90% water. The fruits are commonly eaten fresh; with its thin rind and small seeds, the melon can be eaten whole.

== Background ==
Regional names

Chinese name
- Chinese: 香瓜
- Literal meaning: fragrant melon
- Hanyu Pinyin: xiāng guā

Korean name
- Hangul: 참외
- Revised Romanization: chamoe
- McCune–Reischauer: ch'amoe

Japanese name
- Kanji: 真桑瓜
- Hiragana: まくわうり
- Romanization: makuwa uri

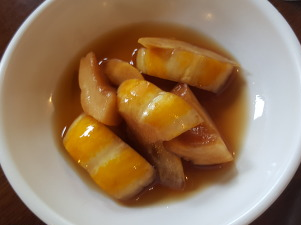
chamoe-jangajji (참외장아찌): chamoe pickled with spices

In China, Oriental melon is locally called xiāng guā (香瓜, "fragrant melon"). It was called tián guā (甜瓜, "sweet melon"), gān guā (甘瓜, "sweet melon") or guǒ guā (果瓜, "fruit melon") in ancient times. However, the latter two names are seldom in use now, and tián guā (甜瓜) has become the name of the species Cucumis melo, thereby also referring to other types of melon such as cantaloupe and honeydew.

The Korean name chamoe (참외 [tɕʰɐmø]) is a composite of words: cham meaning "true" or "real" and oe meaning "cucumber (melon)". It is thought that the oriental melon was introduced to Korea through China during the Three Kingdoms period. The fruit has long enjoyed popularity in Korea, where it is considered the representative fruit of summer. Oriental melons are sometimes made into a side dish, called chamoe-jangajji, whereby they are pickled with spices. In 2017, 41,943 hectares (103,640 acres) of land was used for their cultivation, yielding about 166,281 tonnes (183,293 short tons) of melons. Seongju County in North Gyeongsang Province, South Korea is famous as the centre of oriental melon cultivation in Korea, with farms in the area comprising 70% of total production in the country.

In Japanese, they are called makuwa uri (真桑瓜 [ma.kɯ̟.wa ɯ̟ɾi]). Oriental melon seeds have been found in Jōmon period archaeological sites, attesting to the long history of cultivation in Japan. The name makuwa uri is said to derive from the village of Makuwa, in the ancient province of Mino (now part of Motosu, Gifu), which became known for its high-quality Oriental melons in the 2nd century AD. They were once widely eaten in Japan, having been so common that the general word uri (瓜), meaning gourd or melon, came to refer specifically to the Oriental melon. Starting in 1925, when the first western melon cultivars were introduced, the Oriental melon began to fall out of favour among wealthy consumers, and by the late 20th century came to be thought of as a peasant food. It is commonly used as an offering during the Bon Festival, with the period around the festival considered to be the best time to harvest them (shun, 旬). Unripe melons are often made into various kinds of tsukemono (pickles).

The plant was first classified as "Cucumis melo L. var. makuwa" in 1928 by Japanese botanist Tomitaro Makino. However, it is now usually treated as a cultivar group, Cucumis melo Makuwa Group. Makino's proposed name remains recognised as a synonym.

== Ecology and botany ==
The oriental melon is a cool sub-temperate crop, growing best with day temperatures between 24 and 28 °C (75 and 82 °F) and night temperatures between 16 and 24 °C (61 and 75 °F). It requires good sunlight and rich, well-drained, friable, and moisture-retaining soil. It is drought tolerant, but requires sufficient water for optimal growth.

The plant, a cucurbit, is an annual herbaceous plant that branches and trails. The stem is angular and hirsute (hairy) and 7 millimetres (1/5 in) in diameter. The leaves are reniform (kidney-shaped) with 5-7 lobes. It is andromonoecious (both bisexual and male flowers on same plant) with yellow flowers.

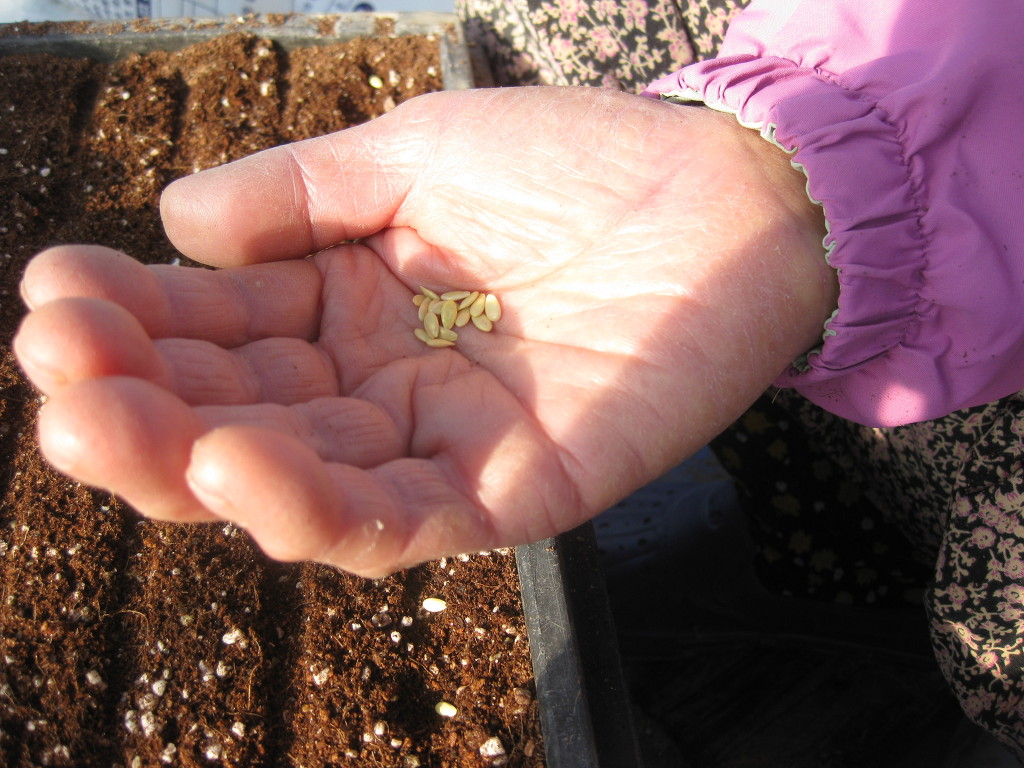
Seeds

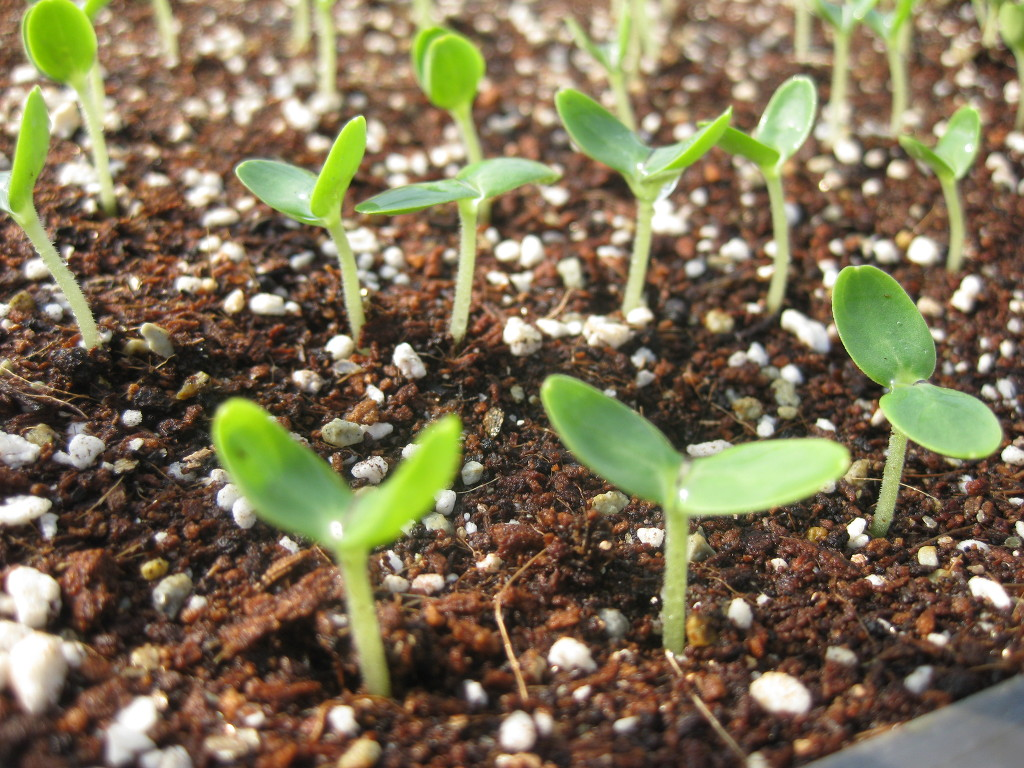
Seedlings (6 days)

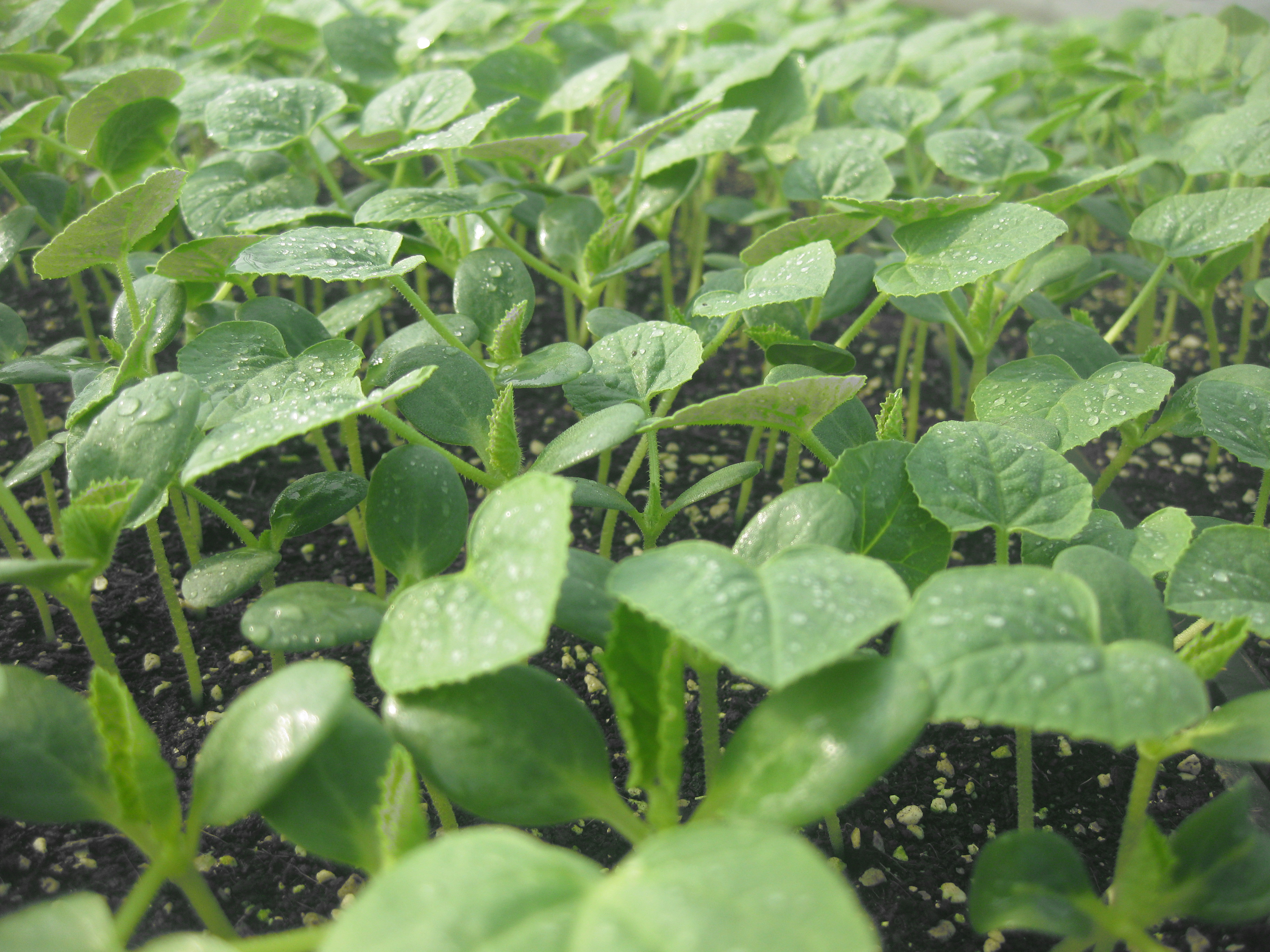
Young plants (12 days)

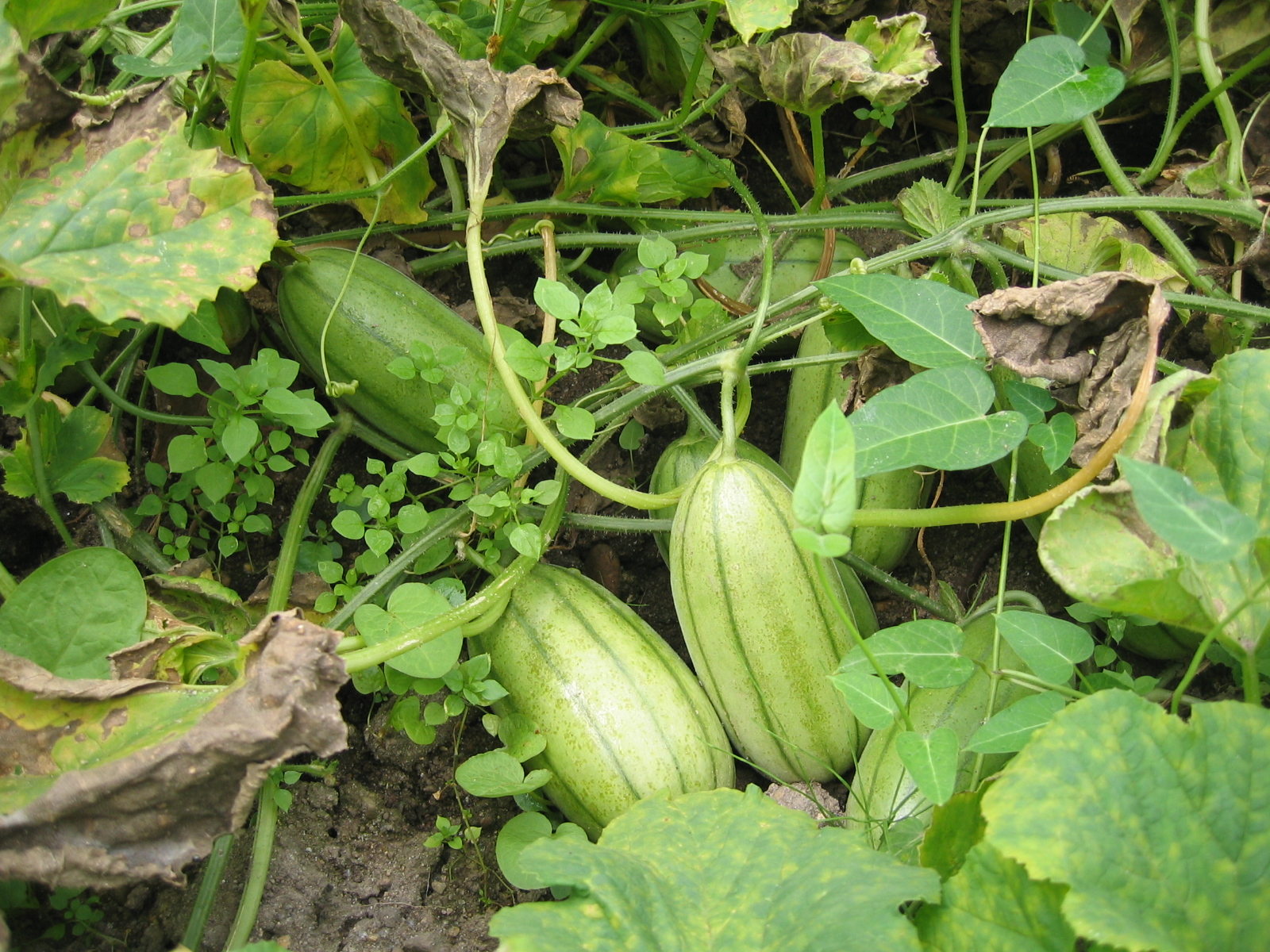
Unripe melons

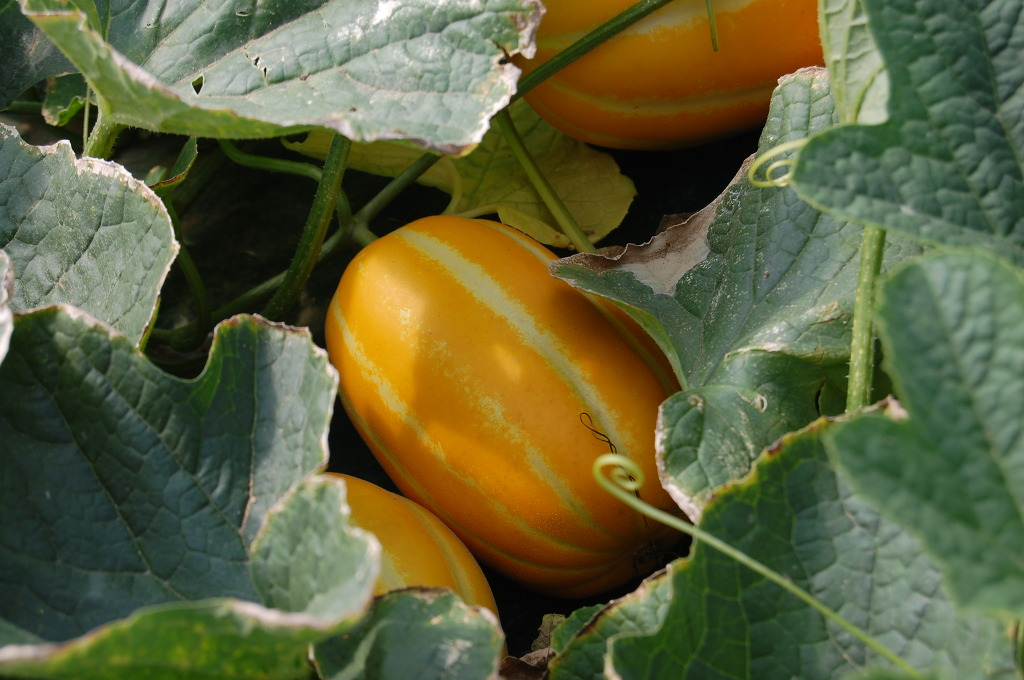
Ripe melons

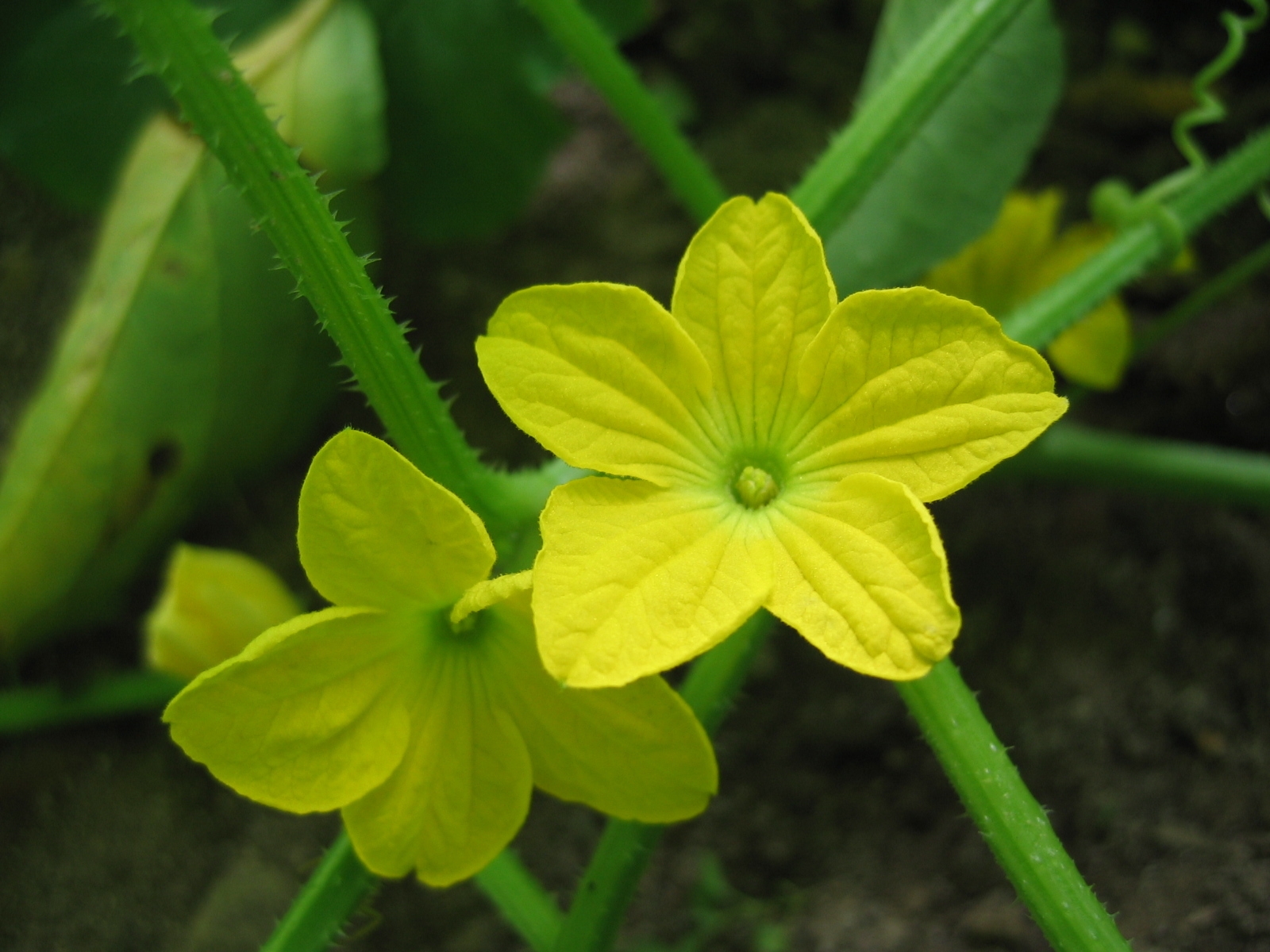
Flowers

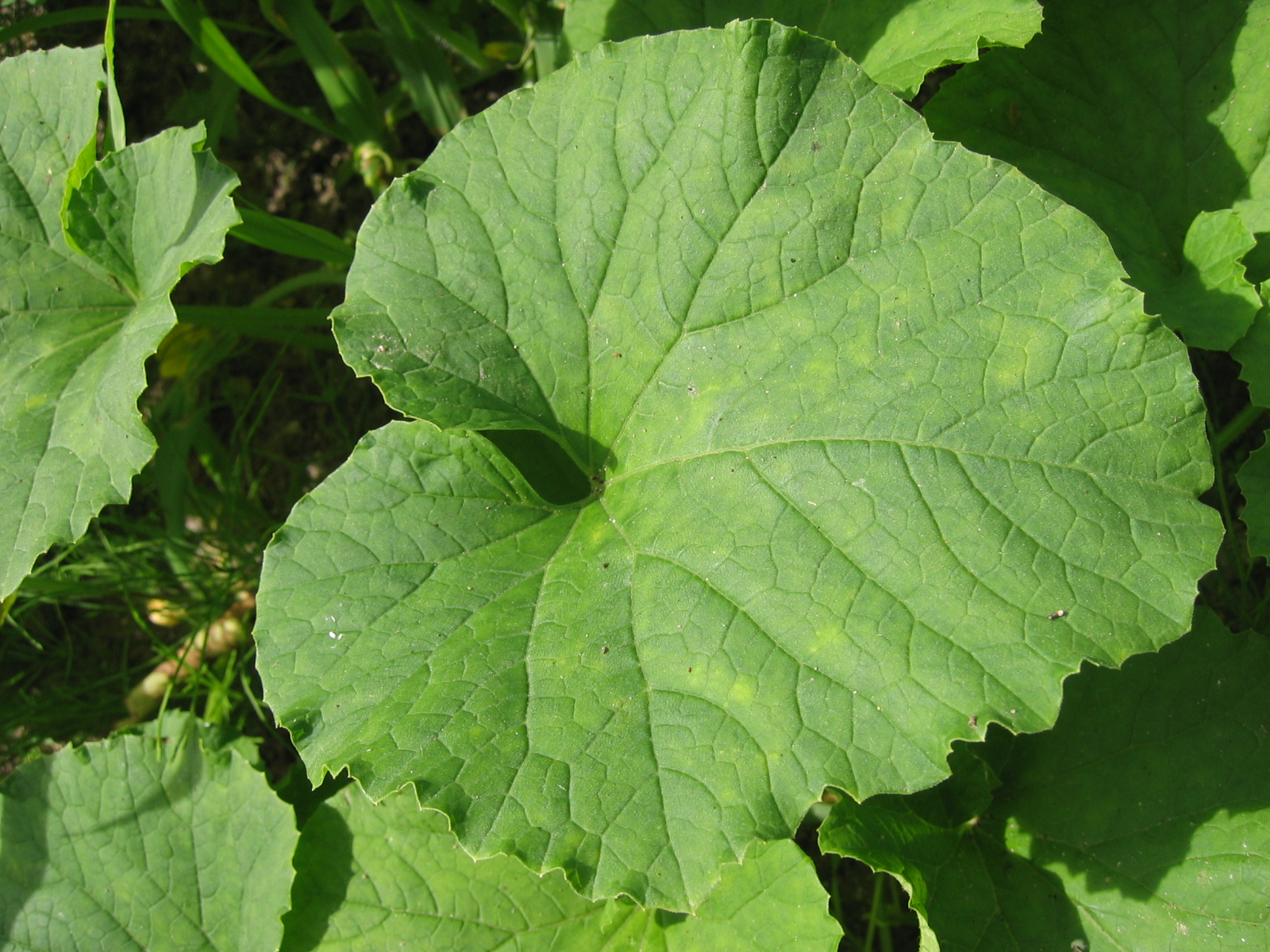
Leaves

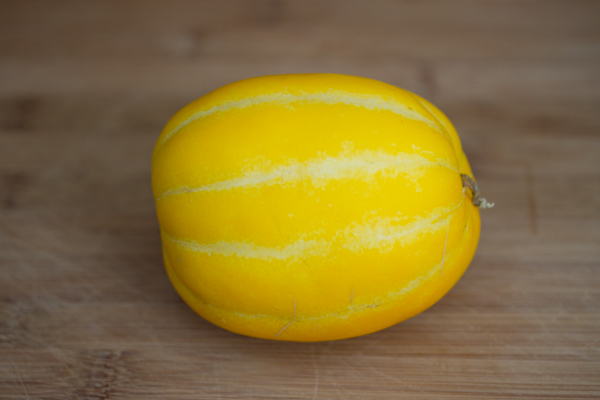
Fruit

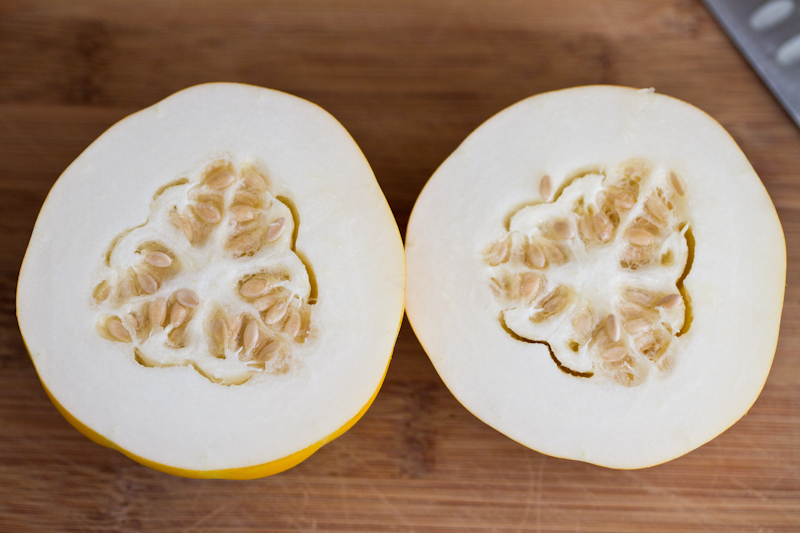
Transverse Section

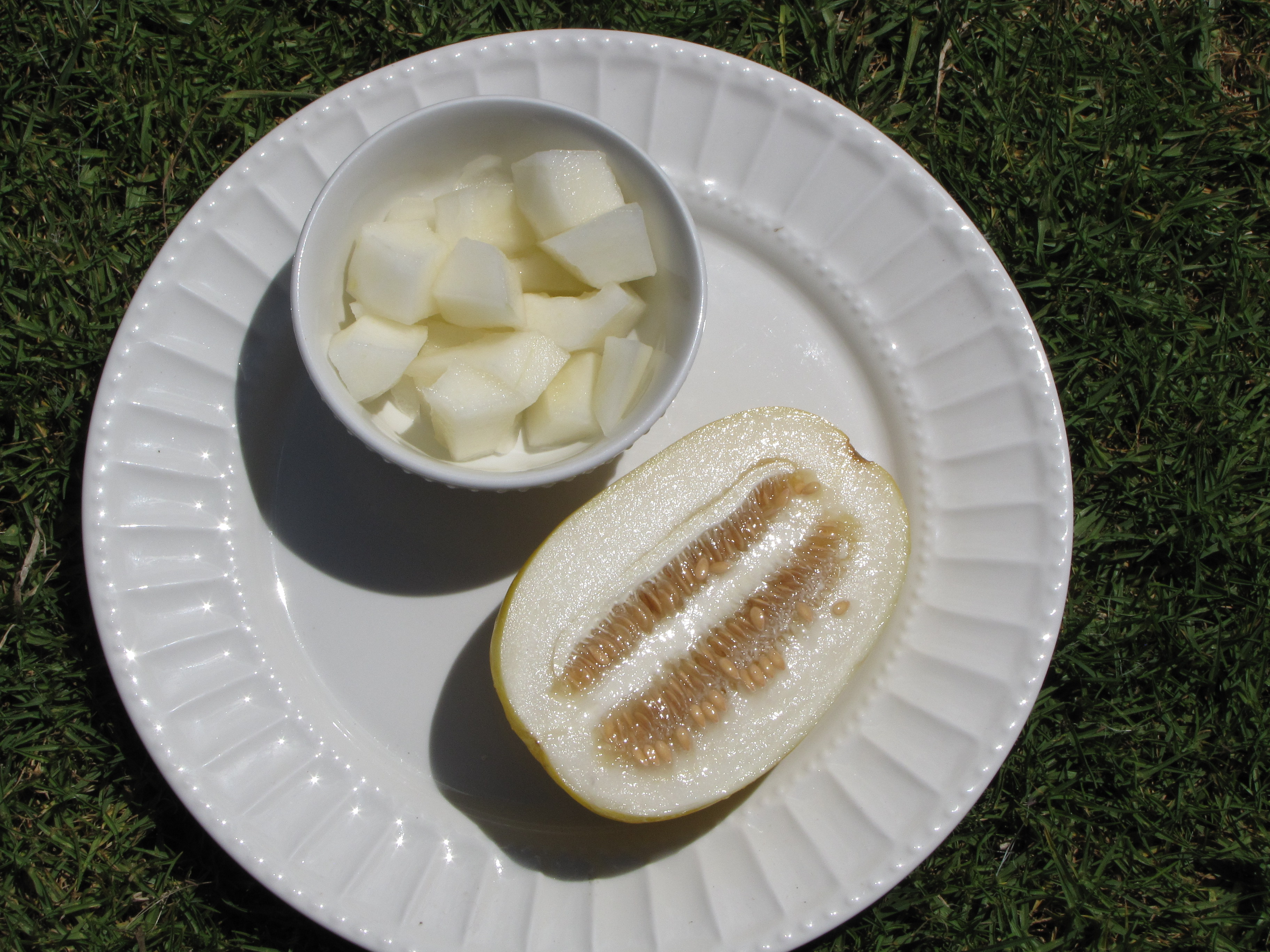
Longitudinal Section

== Varieties ==
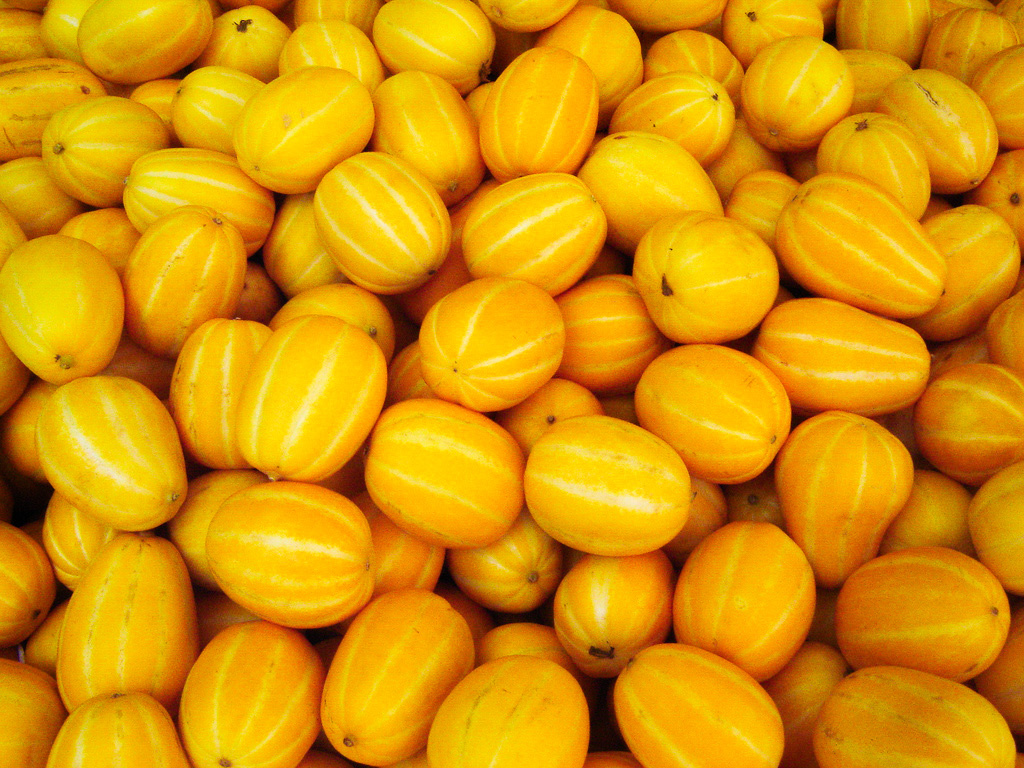
Geumssaragi-chamoe

There are many varieties of oriental melon.

The most well-known variety is called ginsen makuwa (銀泉まくわ) in Japanese and euncheon-chamoe (은천참외) in Korean. Euncheon is the Korean reading of the Chinese characters used in the Japanese name. This type of melon was developed in Toyama, Japan, where it is now recognised as a "traditional vegetable". It was introduced into Korea in 1957, rapidly became the dominant commercial variety there, and its descendants remain so today. Varieties developed from the euncheon include: sin-euncheon ('new euncheon'), developed in the 1970s, and geumssaragi-euncheon (금싸라기은천, 'gold dust euncheon'), developed in 1984, which is now dominant. It is yellow in colour, typically about 6 inches (15 cm) long, and weighs about 1 pound (450 g). It is smooth and oblong, with white stripes that run the length of the fruit. It has white flesh that is juicy and sweet, and is filled with small white seeds.

Other cultivars are coloured green and ivory, and vary from spherical to oblong in shape.

There are two major landraces of chamoe in Korea: sunghwan-chamoe (성환참외), also known as gaeguri-chamoe (개구리참외, 'frog chamoe'), and Gotgam-chamoe (곶감참외). The sunghwan-chamoe is sometimes classified under another cultivar group, Cucumis melo Chinensis Group. The gotgam-chamoe is particularly unique, having the aroma of a dried persimmon (called gotgam in Korean), from which it takes its name. These two landraces contain more nutrients and have greater disease resistance than other varieties.

A variety called the Golden Makuwa (黄金まくわ) is recognised by the government of Nara Prefecture as a "Yamato vegetable" (大和野菜), a distinction indicating its importance in that region's agricultural and culinary tradition. It has golden skin, white flesh, and usually weighs about 300 grams (11 oz). In 1955, Golden Makuwa comprised 85.6% of all melons (western and oriental) sold at the Osaka Central Wholesale Market.

Another variety, the New Melon (ニューメロン), is spherical, has a greenish-yellow skin, green flesh, and usually weighs about 300–400 grams (11–14 oz). In 1962, the Sakata Seed Company crossbred this with the Charentais melon, a type of European cantaloupe, to produce the Prince Melon (プリンスメロン), which quickly became the dominant commercial melon variety in Japan. Prince melons weigh between 500 and 600 grams (18 and 21 oz), have a greyish-white skin, and orange flesh. The development of sweeter and easier to produce varieties of hybrid melon, most notably the Prince, led to a rapid decline in cultivation of oriental melons in Japan.

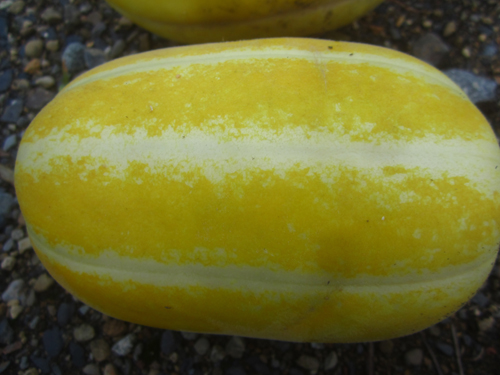
Ginsen–makuwa from Japan

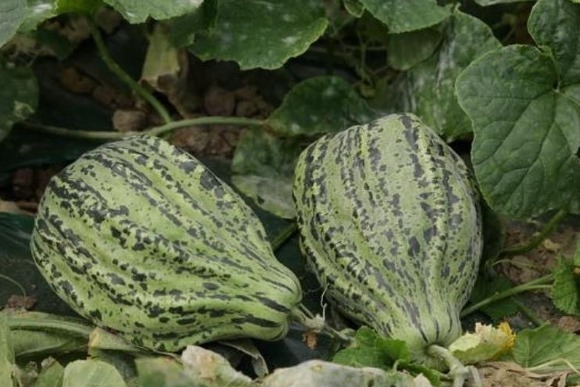
Gaeguri-chamoe (frog chamoe) from Korea

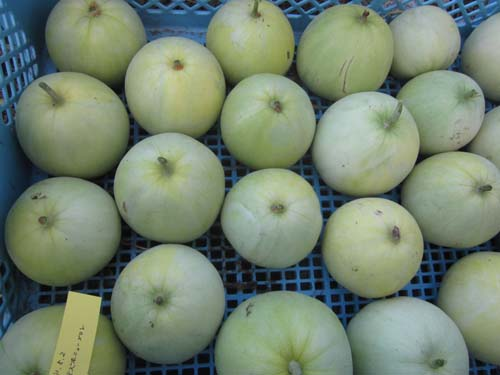
New Melon from Japan

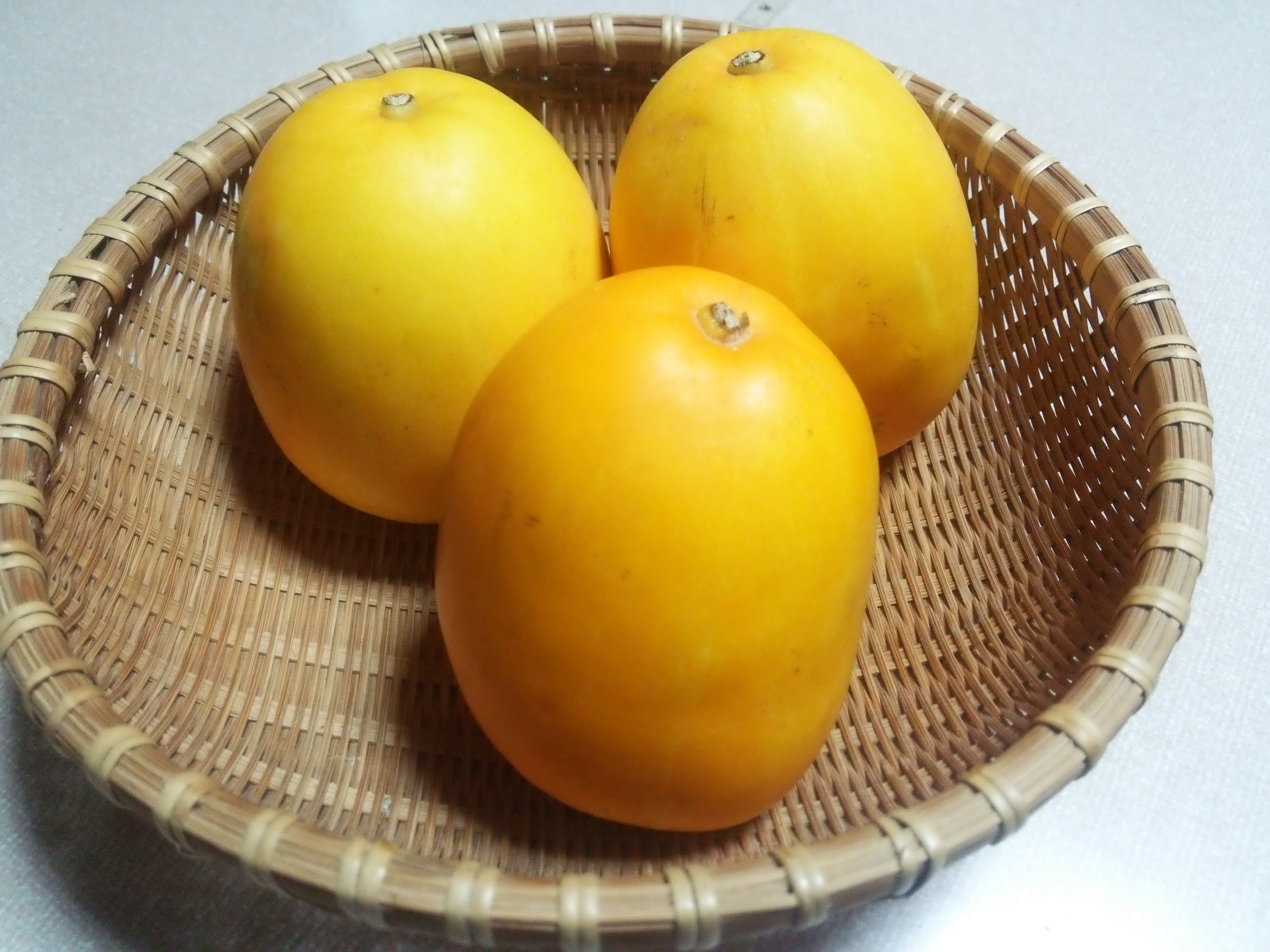
Ōgon-makuwa (golden makuwa) from Japan

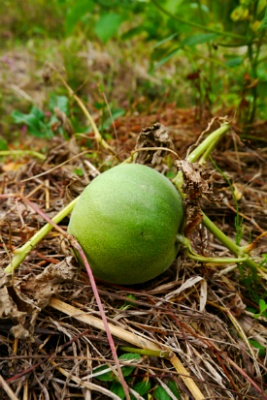
Sagwa-chamoe (apple chamoe) from Korea

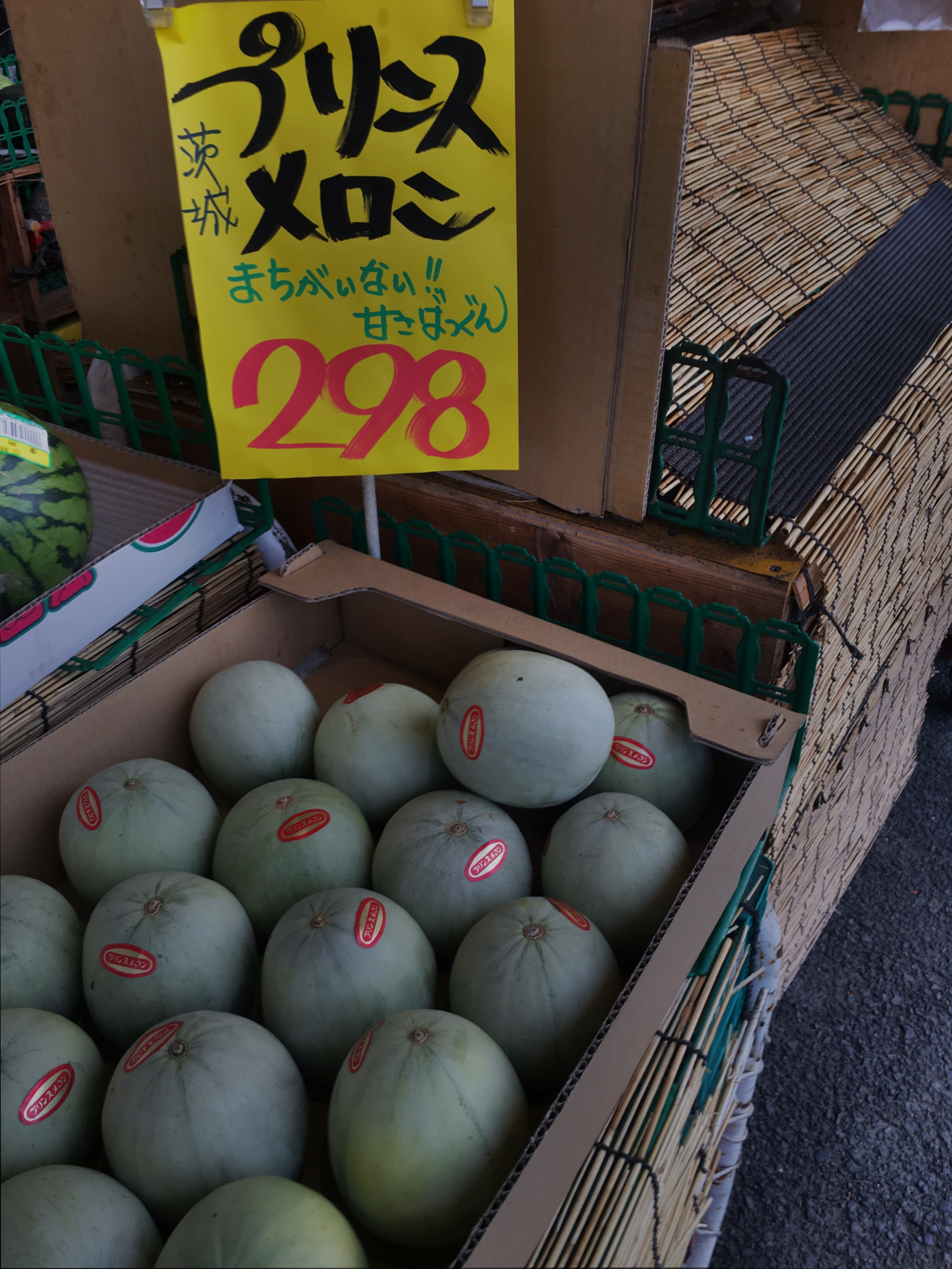
Prince melons being sold in Japan

== Cultural significance ==
South Korea National Treasure numbers 94 and 114 are both formed in the shape of an oriental melon.

The annual Yeoju Geumsa Oriental Melon Festival (Korean: 여주 금사참외축제) is held once a year, and visitors can sample the melons there.

There is an Oriental Melon Ecology Centre in Seongju County, designed to educate the public regarding the cultivation and other aspects of the fruit.

Included in a collection of drawings of Japanese yōkai by 17th century artist Yosa Buson is a depiction of an "oriental melon monster" (真桑瓜のばけもの, makuwauri no bakemono).

A sign that promotes 'the birthplace of the oriental melon' was erected at Kitagata-Makuwa Station in the city of Motosu, Japan, the site of the former village of Makuwa.

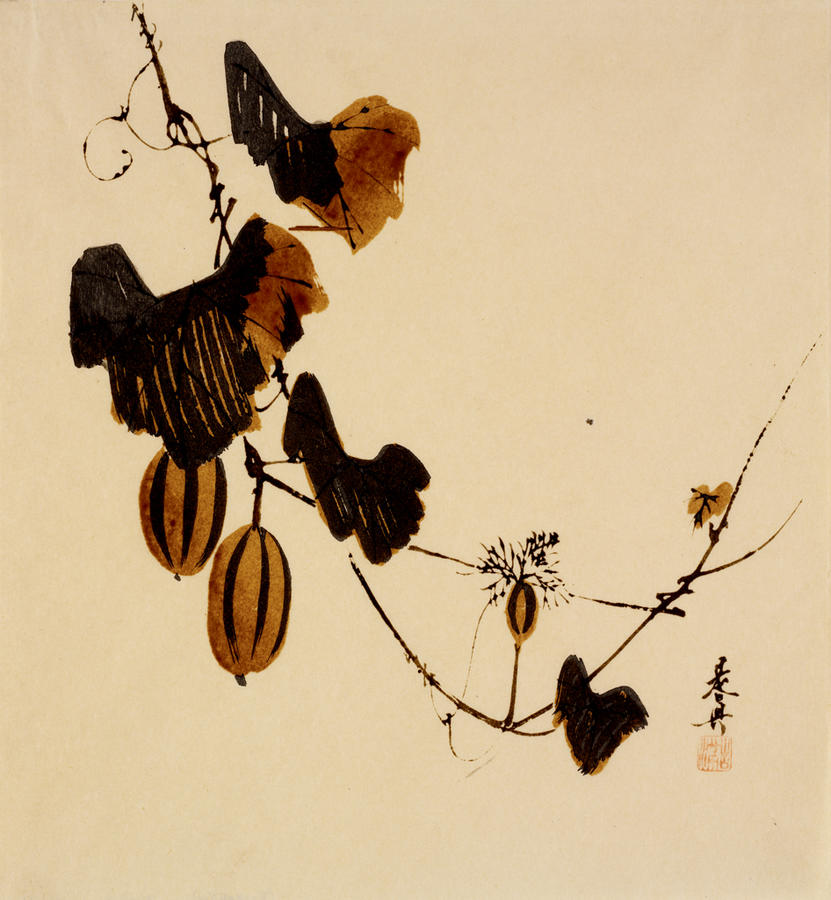
Print of oriental melons on the vine by Shibata Zeshin

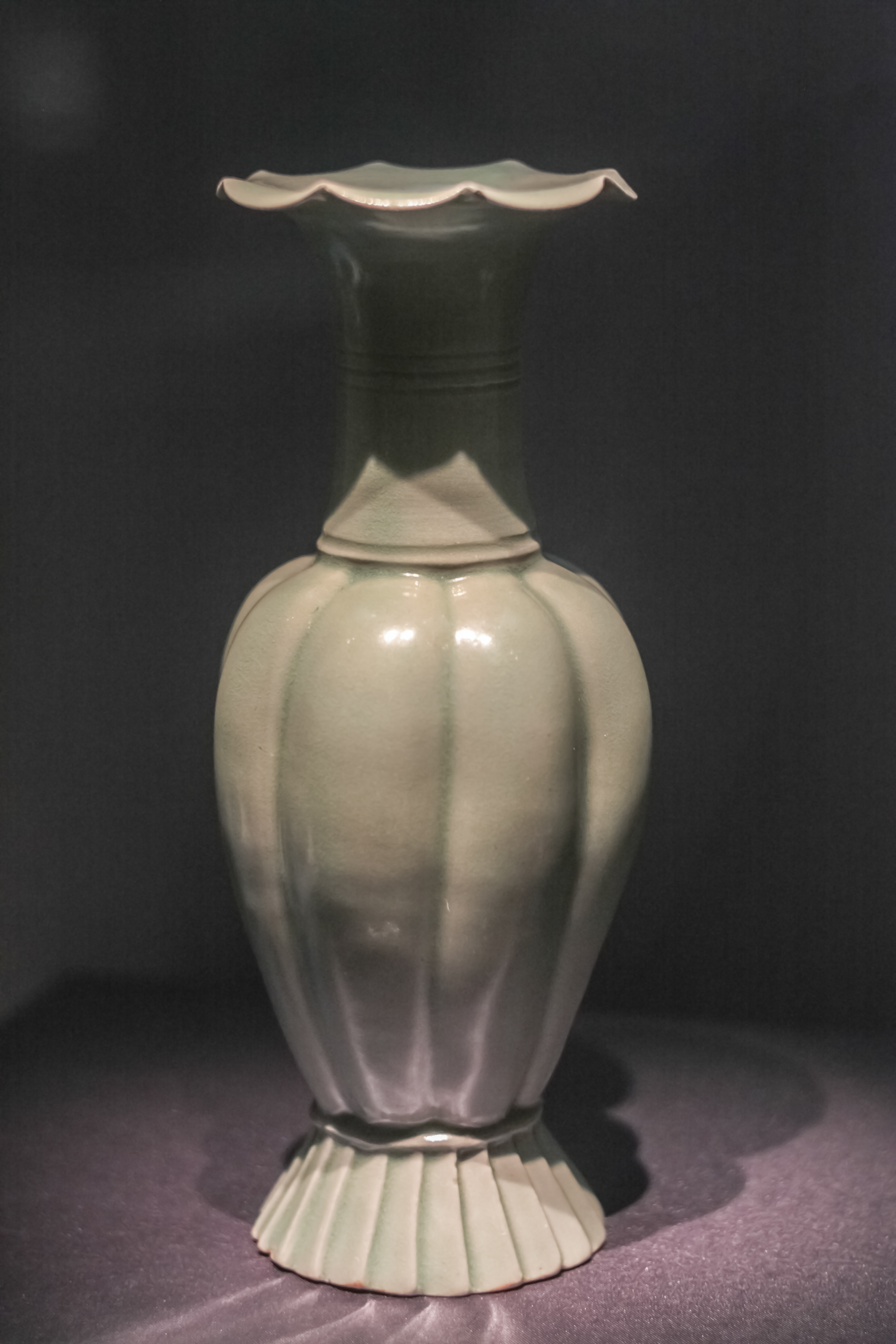
Melon-shaped Celadon Bottle from Goryeo (918–1392), at the National Museum of Korea

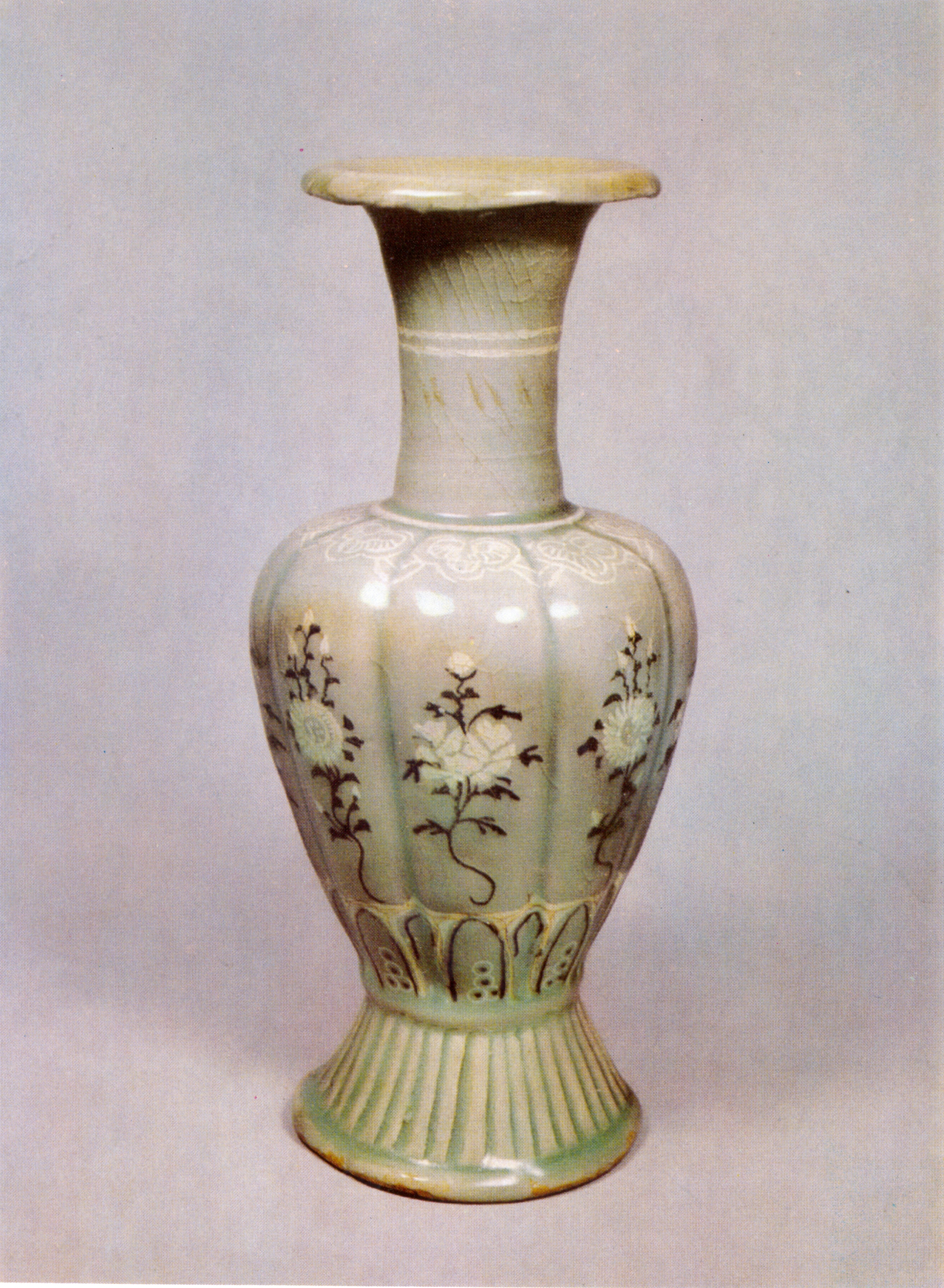
Melon-shaped Celadon Bottle with Inlaid Peony and Chrysanthemum Design from Goryeo, at the National Museum of Korea

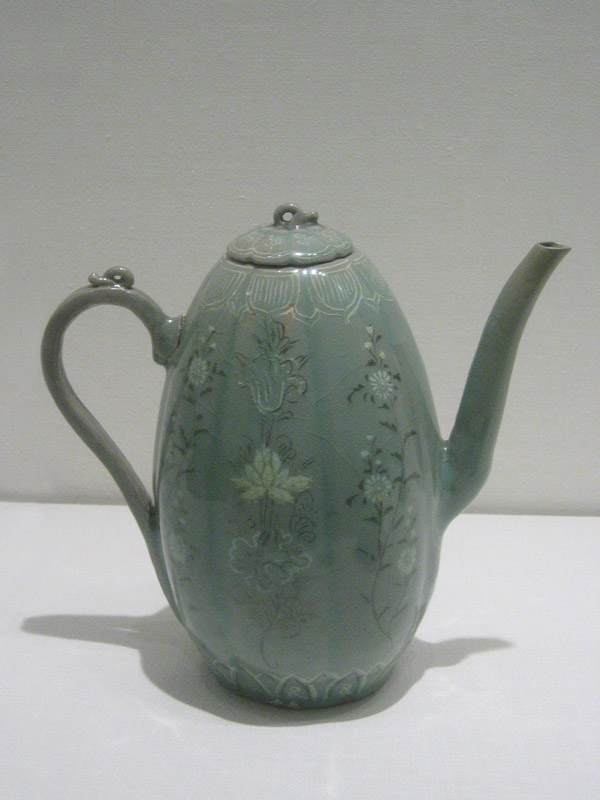
Melon-shaped Celadon Kettle from Goryeo, at the Metropolitan Museum of Art

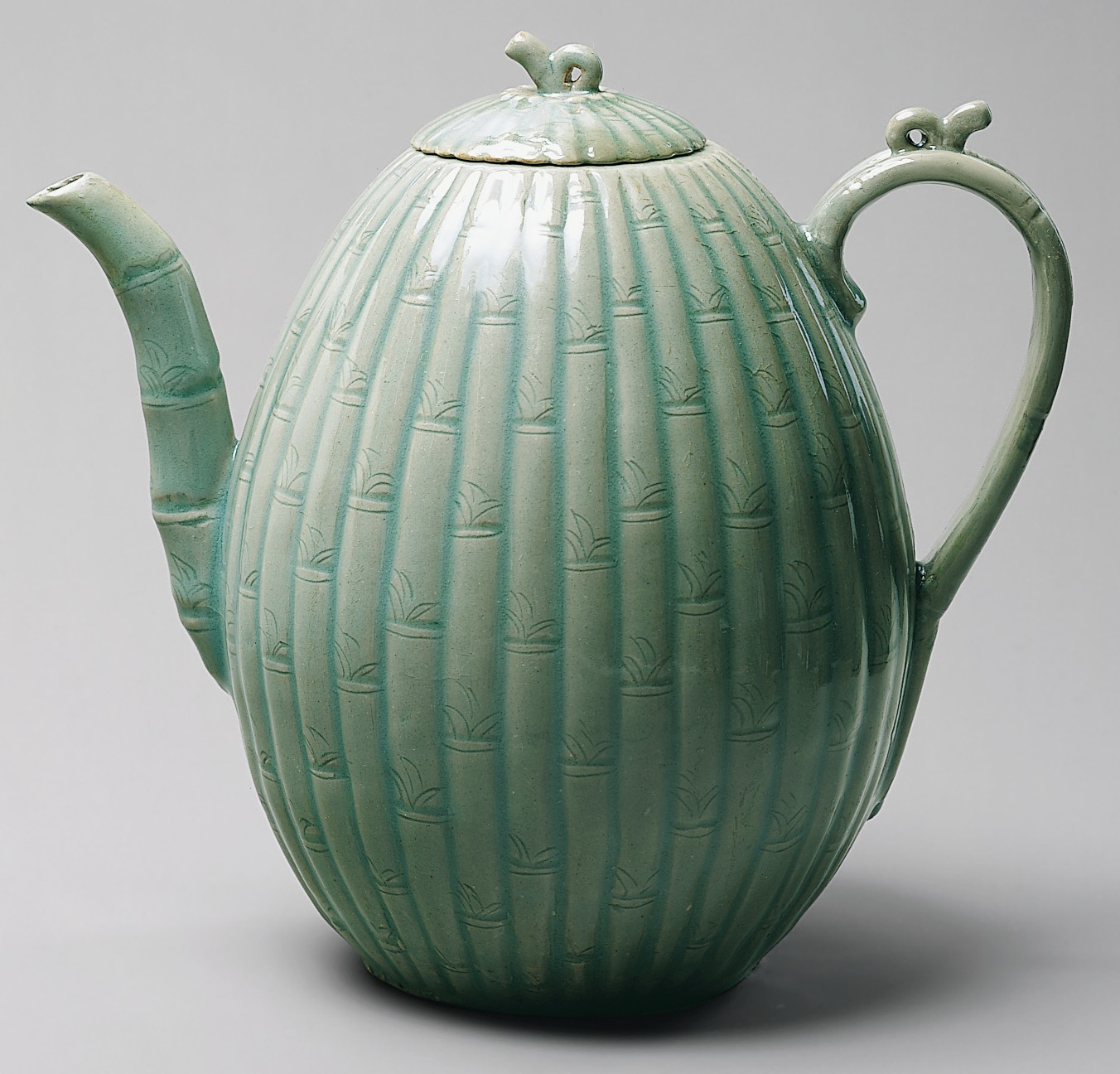
Melon-shaped Celadon Kettle from Goryeo, at the Metropolitan Museum of Art

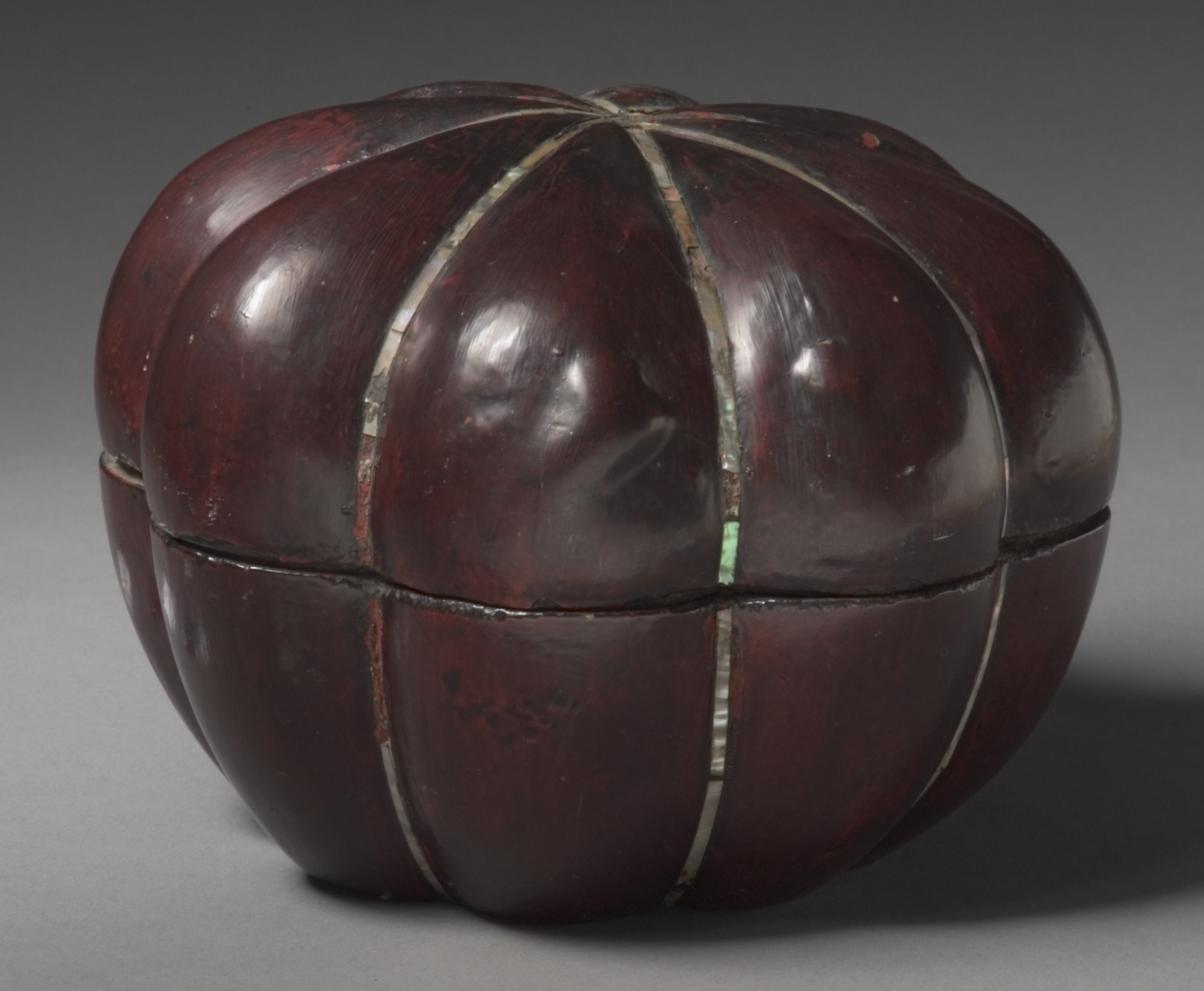
Melon-shaped lacquerware from Joseon, at the Los Angeles County Museum of Art

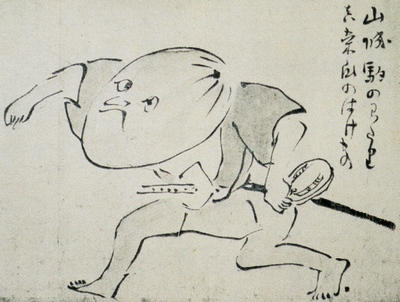
18th century drawing by Yosa Buson of an "oriental melon monster".

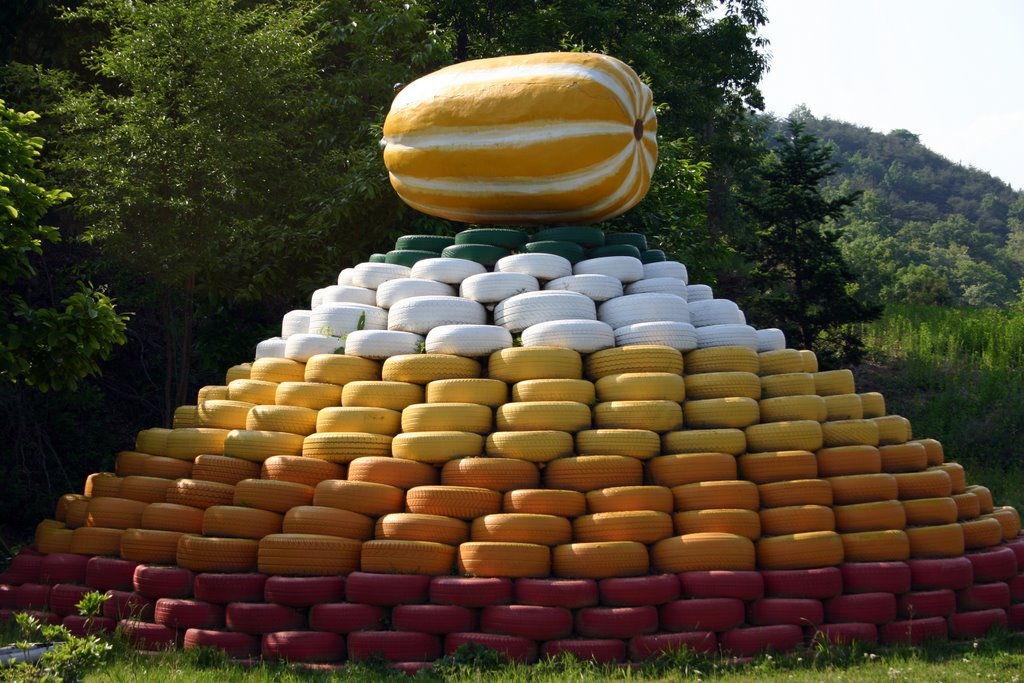
Oriental melon Tower in Yecheon, Korea

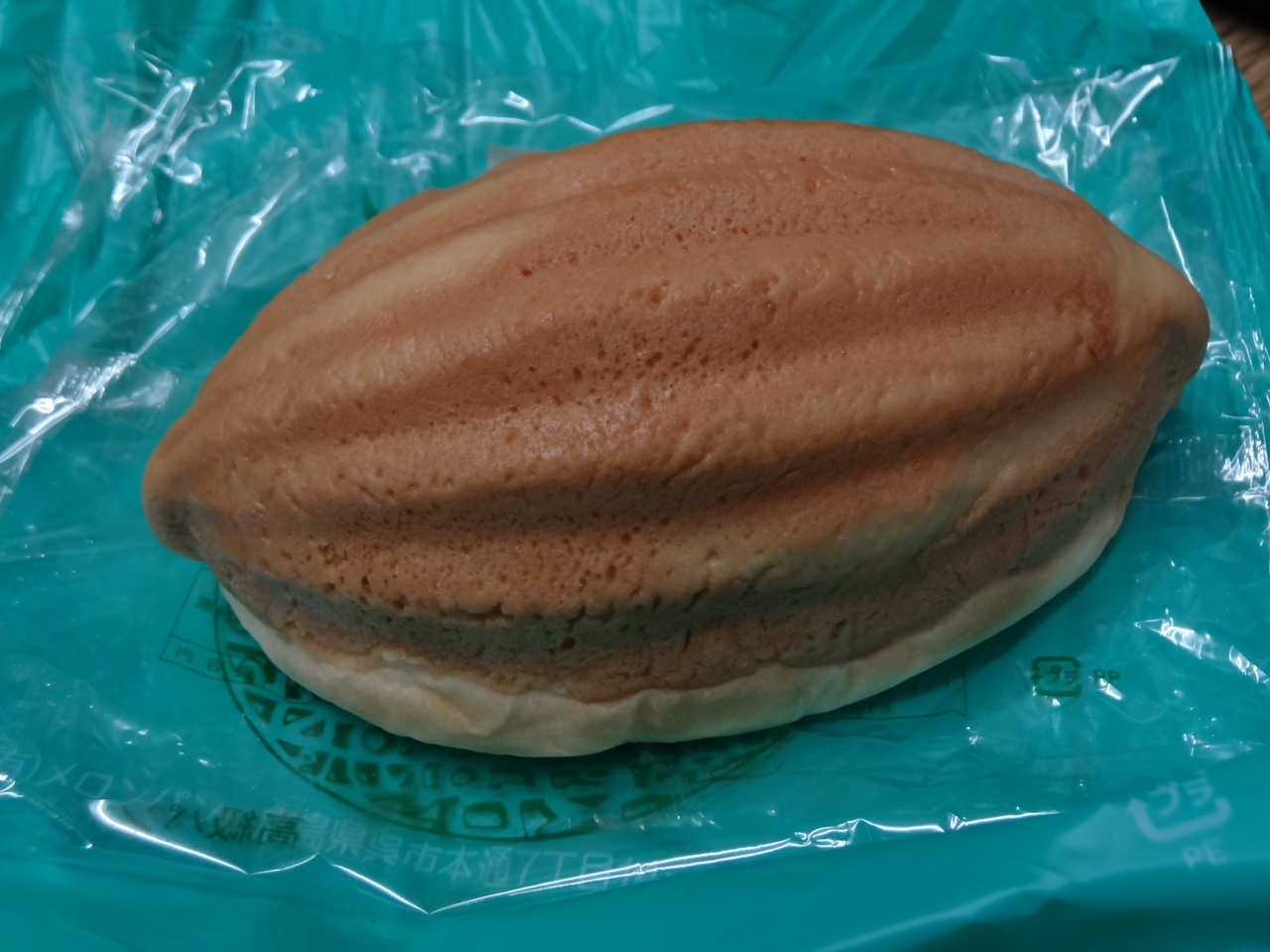
The original Japanese melonpan was produced in the shape of an oriental melon.

== Gallery ==
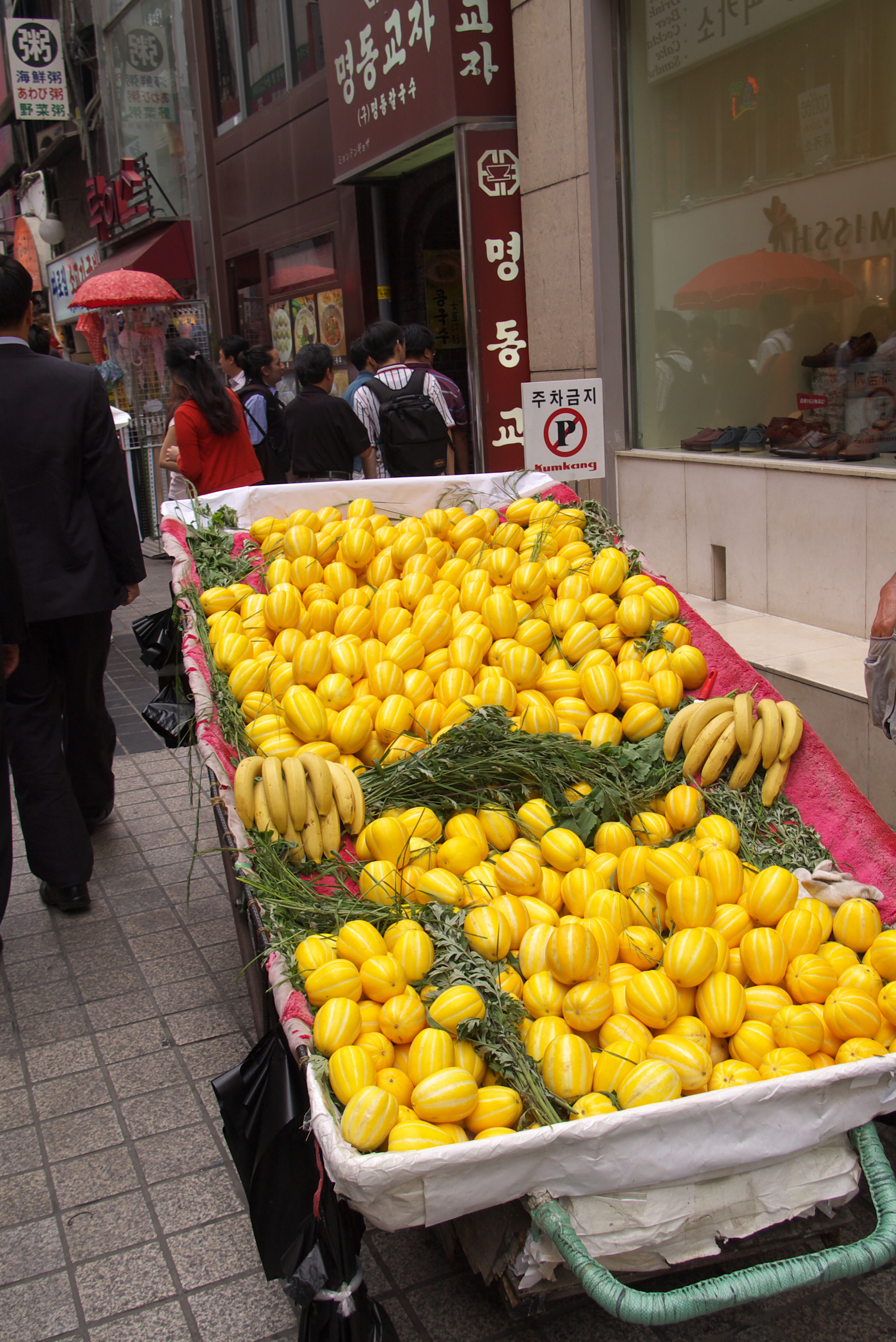
Oriental melon stall in Seoul, South Korea

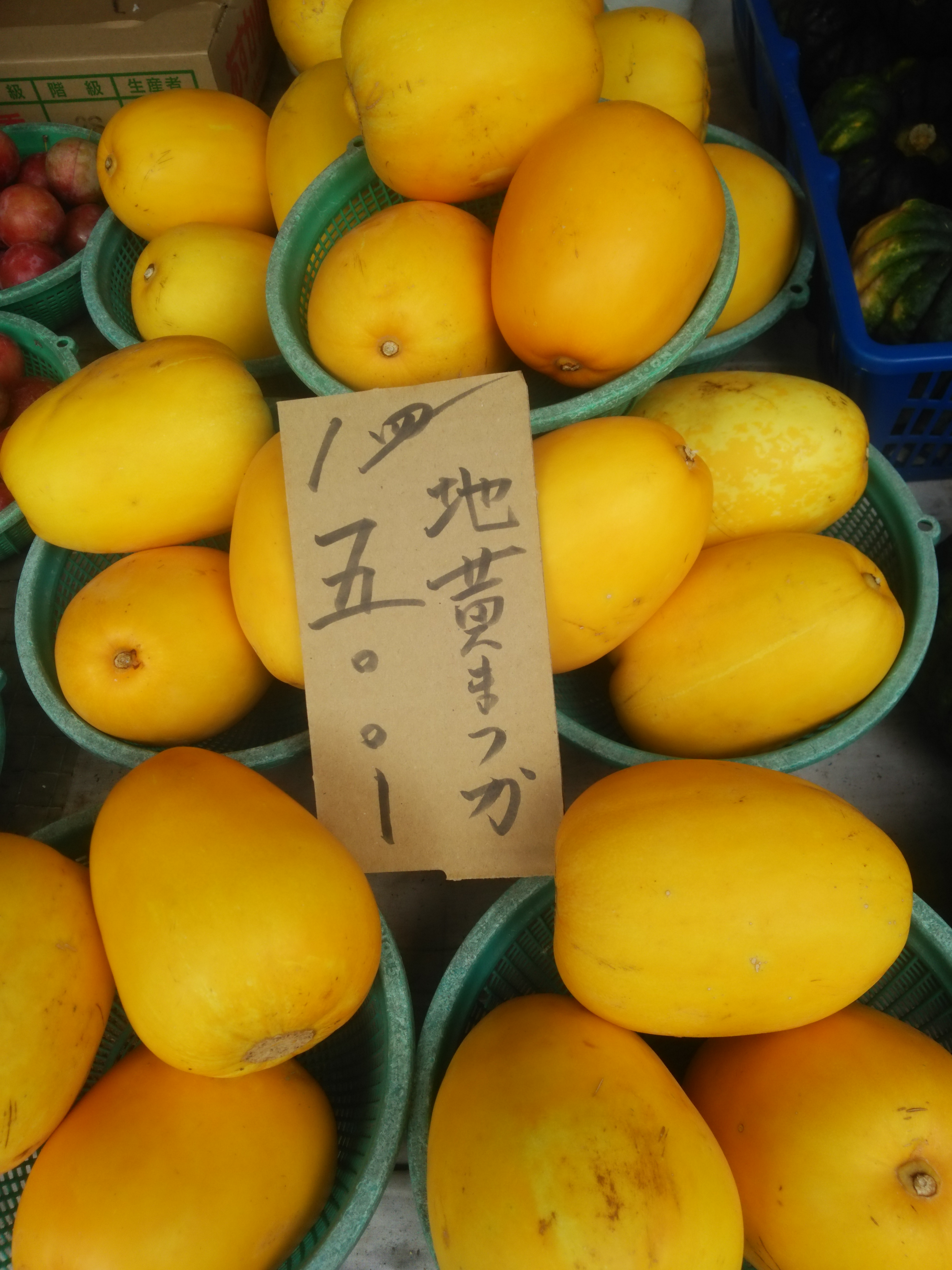
Golden Makuwa melons on sale in Japan

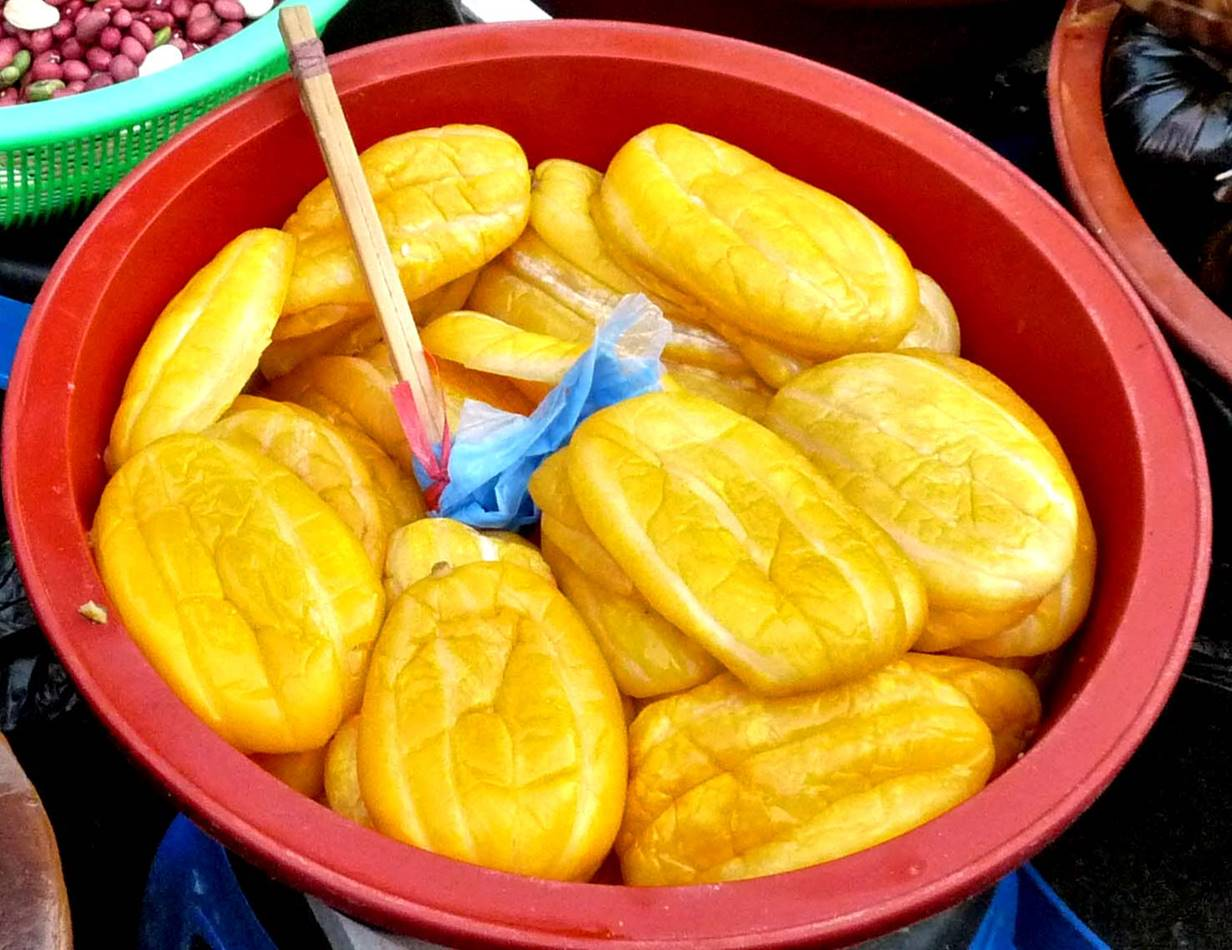
Chamoe-jangajji sold at Namdaemun Market in Seoul

== See also ==
- List of culinary fruits
