= Kim Jong-chang =

- 김종창

7th Governor of the Financial Supervisory Service
- In office March 2008 – March 2011
- Preceded by: Kim Yong-duk
- Succeeded by: Kwon Hyouk-Se

Personal details
- Born: 13 October 1948 (age 77) Yecheon, South Korea

- Kim Jong-chang
- Hangul: 김종창
- Hanja: 金鍾昶
- RR: Gim Jongchang
- MR: Kim Chongch'ang

Kim Jong-chang (born 13 October 1948) was the seventh governor of South Korea's Financial Supervisory Service, from March 2008 to March 2011. He was named to his position on 27 March 2008, after nearly three decades in finance-related government positions and the government-owned Industrial Bank of Korea. He retired on 25 March 2011.

== Personal life ==
Kim was born on 13 October 1948 in Yecheon, North Gyeongsang Province, South Korea, near the Sobaek Mountains. He was raised by his mother and paternal grandfather after losing his father to the Korean War at the age of two. He attended primary, middle, and high school in his hometown, and said that his home room teacher at Daechang High School was a major influence during his formative years. He matriculated at Seoul National University as an undergraduate in 1967, graduating in 1971 with a degree in commerce. He passed the State Administration Examination for Civil Servants in 1970 in his senior year.

When his daughters married in 2008 and 2009, he publicly broke with Korean wedding tradition by refusing gifts of cash, out of concern for the propriety of someone in his position accepting such gifts from people in the sector he was supposed to regulate, and held comparatively simple weddings.

== Early career ==
Kim's first official assignment as a civil servant was in the Economic-Science Council, a presidential advisory body. He joined the Ministry of Finance in 1976. He received a master's degree in economics from the University of Washington in 1985. In 1992, he went to the United Kingdom to begin his service as financial and economic counselor in the South Korean embassy there. He returned to South Korea in 1996 in the Ministry of Finance.

After serving as the FSS' vice-governor from 2000 to 2001, Kim took up the position of chairman and CEO of the government-owned Industrial Bank of Korea, which he held until 2004. He redirected the bank towards an emphasis on consumers and service, and was awarded the Dasan Financial Prize in January 2003 and the Korea Customer Satisfaction CEO award in November the same year. Under his leadership, the state bank's profitability peaked and its stock price jumped to reflect the changes that were made during his helm to turn IBK into "a state bank that makes money". During his tenure at IBK, he also wrote a 240-page not-for-sale promotional book entitled Humorous Bundle (유머보따리), which was distributed in an effort to bring about a spirited corporate culture by changing the stiff image of bankers and create a livelier place of work.

Kim then joined the monetary policy committee of the Bank of Korea.

== As governor of the Financial Supervisory Service ==
As one of his first acts upon taking office, Kim set up the Change Management Task Force and charged it with eliminating the deep-seated practices and embedded culture of heavy-handedness for which the financial supervisory authority was criticized. He also ordered a probe into how the organization was perceived at large in order to identify areas that the market viewed as heavy-handed of the financial regulator, and to clearly set down the accountability and performance of senior officials, a structure of divisions was adopted to complement the oversight of the respective areas of financial services.

In November 2008, Kim had the Corporate Credit Task Force set up within the FSS in a joint FSS-FSC step to back a corporate restructuring drive, to be led by creditor financial institutions. Unlike the aftermath of the 1997 Asian financial crisis, when the restructuring of insolvent corporate debtors had taken place in an atmosphere of panic, Kim championed a preventive restructuring drive based on corporate debtors and industrial sectors that were likely to face difficulties in meeting their obligations. Corporate restructuring moved forward in those industries particularly susceptible to global economic cycles, such as shipbuilding, shipping, and construction industries. The media credited Kim for having quelled some of the looming uncertainties that unnerved financial markets.

In an effort to raise the level of financial support to low-income earners, Kim also encouraged the country's banks to lend to those who were affected most by the 2008 financial crisis. He dispatched bank examiners to banks to ensure that industry malpractices such as compensating deposits and balances were restrained. He also launched a series of programs within the FSS to redress financial negligence and malpractices and to respond to consumer reports of financial malpractice, such as commissions for intermediation. He also pointed out the need to lower the financial costs of those in the lower income brackets by doing away with the banking practice of requiring cosignatories for loans.

== Publications ==
- 김종창 [Kim Jong-chang] (2002), 거창한 외부 변화는 진정한 변화가 아니다 [Grandiose outward change is not true change], in 유승용 [Yu Seung-yong] (ed.), CEO Talk: 인생의 지혜 성공의 비결 [CEO Talk: Secrets for a Successful Life] (in Korean), 무한 [Muhan], pp. 32–37, ISBN 978-89-5601-015-1
- 김종창 [Kim Jong-chang] (2006), Great Bank, 매일경제신문사 [Maeil Gyeongje Sinmunsa], ISBN 978-89-7442-422-0
