= Financial Hub Center =

South Korean government service

Financial Hub Center (Fn Hub Korea) is the center of the Financial Supervisory Service responsible for assisting the launch and expansion of financial companies' business in South Korea. It was founded in September 2008 under the Act on the Creation and Development of Financial Hubs and has the purpose of promoting Seoul and Busan as major international financial centers in Northeast Asia. The center provides free advice and one-stop services to help financial companies operate successfully in South Korea's vibrant financial market. It also helps South Korean financial companies expand into international markets for global business opportunities.

Fn Hub Korea is organized into four specialized teams, each responsible for supporting the development of clients' business in Korea, working to create international financial centers in Seoul and Busan, helping domestic firms' global expansion, and improving the business and living environments in South Korea.

== Services ==
Working in close partnership with financial businesses, Fn Hub Korea offers the following one-stop services to facilitate financial businesses' initiatives in South Korea.

- Updates on South Korea's financial business environment
- Information on business incorporation and regulations
- Assistance with licensing procedures
- Investor relations events to attract foreign financial businesses to South Korea
- Liaison with government departments to help resolve business grievances
- Assistance with recruitment of talented finance specialists
- Advice on a metropolitan government's incentives and grants
- Living assistance for relocating to South Korea (visa and immigration, international schools, health care, and financial transactions)
- Assistance with offshore business expansion (seminar on licensing procedures in China and Vietnam, case studies)

== See also ==
- Fn Hub Korea
- Financial Services Commission
- Financial Supervisory Service
