= Yonggung Gok clan =

Korean clan from North Gyeongsang Province

- Country: Korea
- Current region: Yecheon County
- Founder: Gok Geung hoe

Yonggung Gok clan (Korean: 용궁 곡씨; Hanja: 龍宮 曲氏) was one of the Korean clans. Their Bon-gwan was in Yecheon County, North Gyeongsang Province. According to the research in 2000, the number of Yonggung Gok clan was 148. Their founder was Gok Geung hoe who was naturalized from Tang dynasty. Gok Geung hoe served as the government post named pyeongchal (Hanja: 評察) in Goryeo during Taejo of Goryeo’s reign.

== See also ==
- Korean clan names of foreign origin
