= Financial Services Commission (South Korea) =

South Korean executive ministry for financial regulation

- 금융위원회

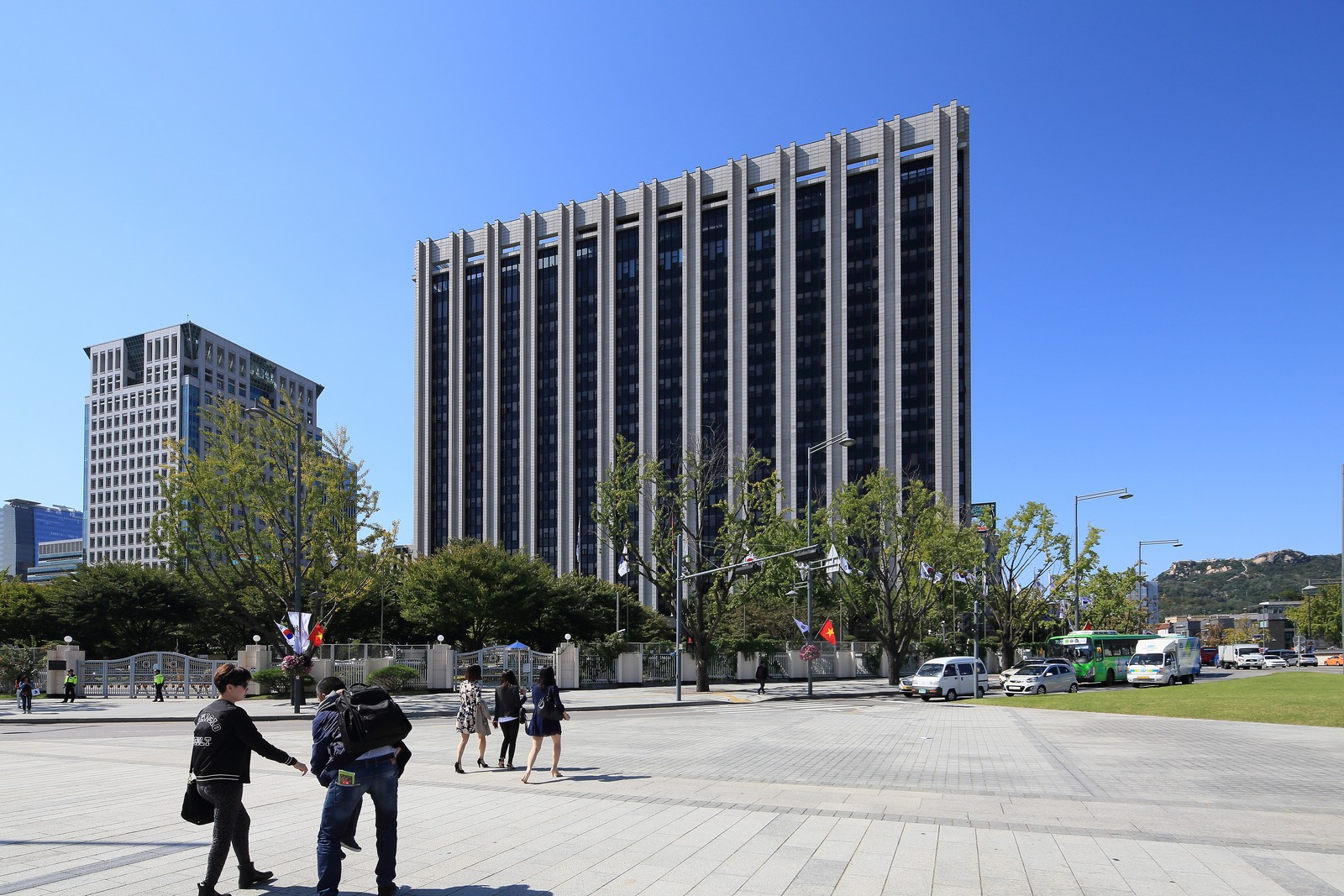
- FSC headquarters in Government Complex Seoul of Jongno District

Agency overview
- Formed: April 1998; 28 years ago (as Financial Supervisory Commission); 3 March 2008; 18 years ago (as Financial Services Commission)
- Preceding agency: Financial Supervisory Commission
- Jurisdiction: Government of South Korea
- Headquarters: Seoul, South Korea
- Agency executives: Lee Eog-weon, Chairman; Kim So-young, Vice Chairman
- Parent agency: Office of Prime Minister of South Korea
- Child agency: Financial Supervisory Service
- Website: fsc.go.kr/eng

Korean name
- Hangul: 금융위원회
- Hanja: 金融委員會
- RR: Geumyung wiwonhoe
- MR: Kŭmyung wiwŏnhoe

The Financial Services Commission (FSC), formerly Financial Supervisory Commission, is South Korean government's top financial regulator. It makes financial policies, and directs the Financial Supervisory Service.

The Financial Supervisory Commission was established in 1998. With the start of Lee Myung-bak administration, the Commission was rearranged into the Financial Services Commission; the new one took over the policy-making authority from the Finance Ministry.

As part of social responsibility, in 2014 the FSC Chairman Shin Je-yoo made plans to regulate the degree of innovativeness of banks, requiring them to make public the wages of employees and executives in comparison to overall profit.

This part of measured to encourage financial banks to create more value and jobs with an innovative management. It will see whether the banks are financing enough promising tech firms for going conservative practices and filling their social responsibility.

== Logo ==
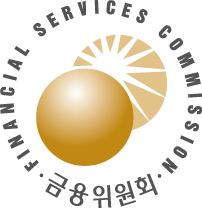
2008~2016

2016~present

== See also ==
- Korea Financial Investment Association
- Financial Supervisory Service
- Bank of Korea
- List of financial supervisory authorities by country
