= Kwon Hyouk-se =

- Hangul: 권혁세
- Hanja: 權赫世
- RR: Gwon Hyeokse
- MR: Kwŏn Hyŏkse

Kwon Hyouk-se (Korean: 권혁세; born 12 November 1956) is the eighth governor of South Korea's Financial Supervisory Service. He took office in March 2011 after about 30 years of experience in government service. He was previously the vice chairman of Financial Services Commission (FSC).

== Education ==
Kwon was born in Daegu, North Gyeongsang Province, on 12 November 1956. He graduated from Gyeongbuk High School in February 1975 and received a B.A. in Business Administration at Seoul National University in February 1980. While in his senior year, he passed the State Administration Examination for Civil Servants in 1979. Then he studied Public Administration at Seoul National University and went on to Vanderbilt University, U.S., where he received an M.A. in Economics in February 1998.

== Career ==
Starting his career in the civil service as a Ministry of the Government Administration deputy director in 1980, Kwon served as Economic Advisor Council to the President, Director General at Financial Policy Bureau, Ministry of Finance and Economy (MoFE, predecessor to the Ministry of Strategy and Finance), Industrial Counselor at Prime Minister's Office and Director General at Tax Office, MoFE.

Since 2007, he has taken up financial policy-related positions, including Director General of Supervisory Policy Bureau at Financial Supervisory Commission in 2007, Standing Commissioner of Securities and Futures Commission in 2008 and FSC Secretary General and Vice-Chairman in 2009.

As Director General of Supervisory Policy Bureau at Financial Supervisory Commission, he contributed to reducing excessive competition widespread in the banking and credit card industries and developed measures to stabilize real estate markets including the regulation of Loan to Value (LTV). During his tenure as a Standing Commissioner of Securities and Futures Commission, he led capital market reforms, laying the foundation for the enactment of Financial Investment Services and Capital Market Act. He has extensive expertise and experience in tax policy and macro-economic policy, as well as financial policy and supervision.

Learning from the 2008 financial crisis that financial firms were prospering at the expense of consumers and the whole financial system, the FSS governor put the top priority on consumer protection and called for local banks to pay more attention to their corporate social responsibility (CSR).
