= Charentais melon =

Hybrid melon

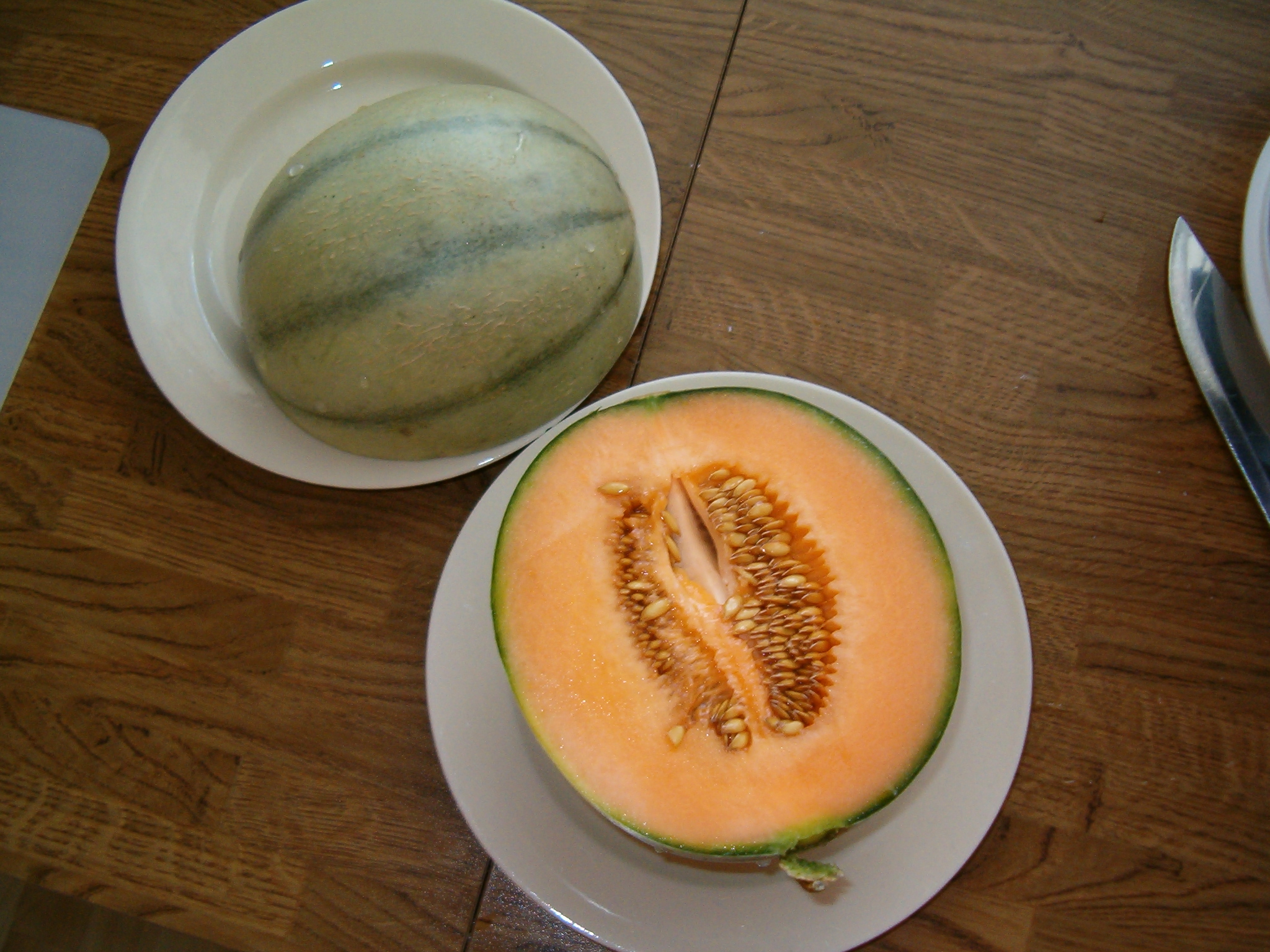
A Charentais melon hybrid with somewhat netted skin, split in half

A Charentais melon or French melon is a type of French cantaloupe, Cucumis melo var. cantalupensis.

It is a small variety of melon, around the size of a softball. It has flesh similar to most cantaloupes, but with a distinct and more intense aroma, and a more orangey hue. It originated in the Charentes region of France, and is most associated with the Provençal area around the town of Cavaillon. Most true Charentais melons are grown in and around this region, and are almost exclusively available in France, as their thin skin and soft flesh does not do well in shipping. Hybrids of this variety are widely grown and are generally crossed with North American cantaloupes for better shipping characteristics and larger size.

The Charentais melon is the most cultivated melon type in France. The shelf life of the Charentais melon is about four days.
