= Cantaloupe =

Variety of melon

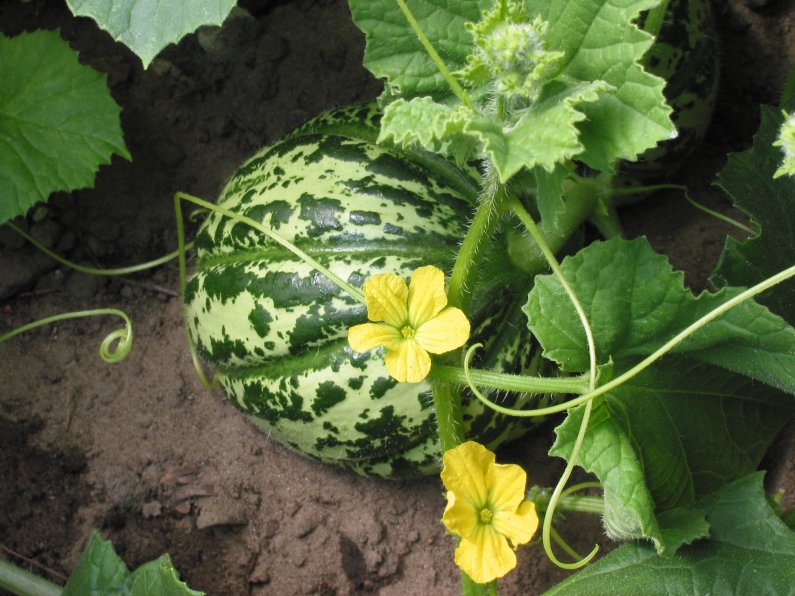
- European cantaloupe (true cantaloupe)
- Genus: Cucumis
- Species: C. melo
- Subspecies: C. melo subsp. melo
- Cultivar group: Cantalupensis Group (incorporating Reticulatus Group)

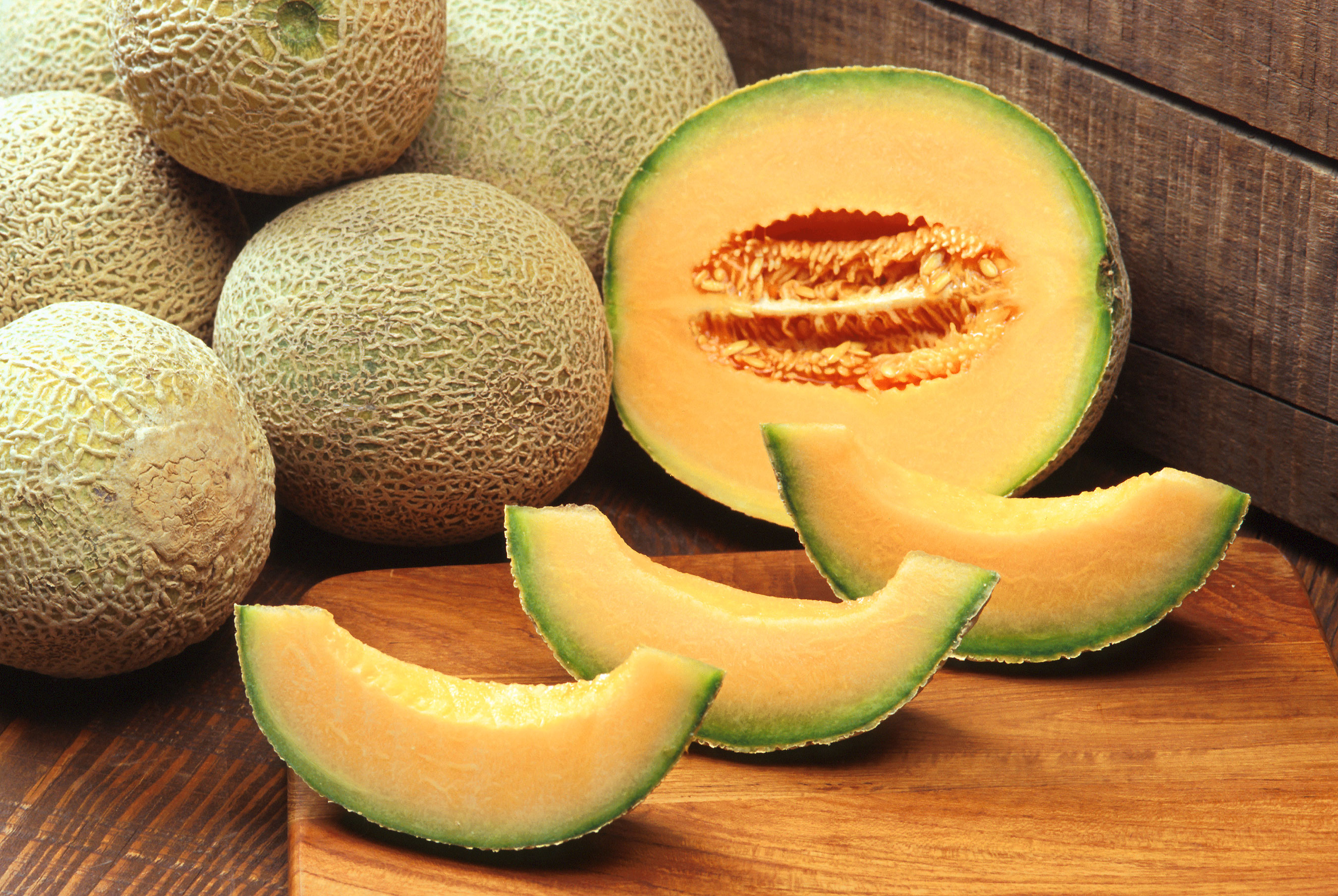
American Western cantaloupe (muskmelon)

The cantaloupe (also spelled cantaloup and cantelope; /ˈkæn.tə.loʊp/, KAN-tə-lohp or /ˈkæn.tə.luːp/, KAN-tə-loop) is a type of true melon (Cucumis melo) with sweet, aromatic, and usually orange flesh. Originally, cantaloup referred to the true cantaloupe or European cantaloupe with non- to slightly netted and often ribbed rind. Today, it also refers to the muskmelon with strongly netted rind, which is called cantaloupe in North America (hence the name American cantaloupe), rockmelon in Australia and New Zealand, and spanspek in Southern Africa. Cantaloupes range in mass from 0.5 to 5 kilograms (1 to 11 lb).

== Etymology ==
The name cantaloupe derived from the French and Italian languages in relation to Cantalupo, the name of a summer estate of the Vatican City, where these melons were first grown in the 18th century. The name was first used in English in 1739.

== History ==
The cantaloupe may have originated in a region from South Asia to Africa, although its exact origin is unknown. According to one source, "cantaloupes were cultivated in Egypt and migrated across to Iran and Northwest India dating as far back to Biblical times, about 2400 BC."

== Types ==
The true or European cantaloupe (Cantalupensis group), which has non- to slightly netted rind and orange flesh, includes the following types:

- Subgroup Prescott with deeply ribbed rind, such as 'Prescott Fond Blanc'.
- Subgroup Saccharinu with speckled and slightly ribbed rind, such as 'Sucrin de Honfleur'
- Subgroup Charentais with non-speckled, slightly ribbed and green-sutured rind.

The Israeli cantaloupe (subgroup Ha'Ogen) is similar to the European one, but it has green flesh.

The muskmelon or American cantaloupe (Cantalupensis group), which has strongly netted rind and orange flesh, includes the following types:

Cantaloupe production 2024, millions of tonnes
China	13.2
Kazakhstan	1.5
Turkey	1.5
Guatemala	0.8
Afghanistan	0.7
Iran	0.6
United States	0.6
World	28.2
Source: FAOSTAT of the United Nations

- Subgroup American Western with non- to slightly ribbed and wholly netted rind.
- Subgroup American Eastern with more or less ribbed rind of which the sutures are not or less netted.

Some sources also include Tuscan melons among American cantaloupes. These Tuscan-type melons have smaller seed cavities like American western varieties but also have ribs like American eastern varieties. Tuscan melons have noticeably different flavor, potentially due to higher production of ester compounds in these varieties.

=== Similar types ===
A melon with netted rind is not necessarily a cantaloupe. Many varieties of Chandalak group and Ameri group also have netted rind.

The Japanese muskmelon (subgroup Earl's) resembles the American cantaloupe in netted rind, but differs in green flesh and non-dehiscent peduncles. Therefore, some horticulturists classify the Japanese muskmelon under Inodorus group instead of Cantalupensis or Reticulatus group.

== Production ==
In 2024, world production of cantaloupes (and other melons) was 28 million tonnes, led by China with 47% of the total (table).

Cantaloupe, raw
Nutritional value per 100 g (3.5 oz)
- Energy: 141 kJ (34 kcal)
- Carbohydrates: 8.16 g
- Sugars: 7.86 g
- Dietary fiber: 0.9 g
- Fat: 0.18 g
- Protein: 0.82 g
Vitamins and minerals
Vitamins	Quantity %DV^{†}
Vitamin A equiv. beta-Carotene	26% 232 μg 26% 2780 μg
Thiamine (B1)	4% 0.049 mg
Riboflavin (B2)	2% 0.027 mg
Niacin (B3)	4% 0.694 mg
Pantothenic acid (B5)	2% 0.085 mg
Vitamin B6	2% 0.04 mg
Folate (B9)	4% 14 μg
Vitamin C	12% 10.9 mg
Vitamin K	2% 2.7 μg
Minerals	Quantity %DV^{†}
Calcium	1% 9 mg
Iron	2% 0.38 mg
Magnesium	3% 13 mg
Manganese	2% 0.046 mg
Phosphorus	1% 17 mg
Potassium	5% 157 mg
Sodium	1% 30 mg
Zinc	4% 0.44 mg
- Other constituents: Quantity
- Water: 90 g
- Full Link to USDA Database entry
- ^{†}Percentages estimated using US recommendations for adults, except for potassium, which is estimated based on expert recommendation from the National Academies.

== Uses ==
=== Culinary ===
Cantaloupe is normally eaten as a fresh fruit, as a salad, or as a dessert with ice cream or custard. Melon pieces wrapped in prosciutto are a familiar antipasto. The seeds are edible and may be dried for use as a snack.

Because the surface of a cantaloupe can contain harmful bacteria—in particular, Salmonella, also Listeria— it is recommended that a melon be washed and scrubbed thoroughly before cutting and consumption to prevent risk of Salmonella or other bacterial pathogens.

A moldy cantaloupe in a Peoria, Illinois, market in 1943 was found to contain the highest yielding strain of mold for penicillin production, after a worldwide search.

=== Nutrition ===
Raw cantaloupe is 90% water, 8% carbohydrates, 1% protein and contains negligible fat (table). In a reference amount of 100 grams (3.5 oz), raw cantaloupe supplies 34 calories of food energy, and is a rich source (20% or more of the Daily Value, DV) of vitamin A (26% DV) and a moderate source of vitamin C (12% DV) (table), with no other micronutrients in significant amounts (less than 10% DV).

== See also ==
- Melon
- Watermelon
- Honeydew
