= Corporate workout =

Corporate workout refers to financial rescue of a firm that is outside formal bankruptcy and insolvency law. Also known as out-of-court debt restructuring, corporate workout practices aim to remedy or avoid foreclosure and bankruptcy. The debtors, creditors as well as the main shareholder and bondholders voluntarily participate in the workouts in order to make rearrangements concerning financial investments and rescheduling and restructuring debt. As a way of response to corporate crisis, corporate workout arrangements were widely seen in the aftermath of the Asian financial crisis in 1997.

== See also ==
- Restructuring
- Debt restructuring
- Compromise agreement
- Creditor
- Debt
- Insolvency
- Voluntary redundancy
