= Financial Supervisory Service =

South Korean supervisory agency on financial regulation

- 금융감독원
- Logo of the Financial Supervisory Service

- FSS headquarters building in Yeouido, Seoul

Agency overview
- Formed: January 2, 1999; 27 years ago
- Headquarters: Seoul, South Korea
- Agency executive: Lee Bokhyun, Governor (Since 2022)
- Parent agency: Financial Services Commission
- Website: www.fss.or.kr/eng/main/main.do

Korean name
- Hangul: 금융감독원
- Hanja: 金融監督院
- RR: Geumyung gamdogwon
- MR: Kŭmyung kamdogwŏn

The Financial Supervisory Service (FSS) is South Korea's integrated financial regulator that examines and supervises financial institutions under the broad oversight of the Financial Services Commission (FSC), the government regulatory authority staffed by civil servants.

== History ==
=== Financial Supervisory system in S. Korea prior to FSS ===
Before the Financial Supervisory Service (FSS) was established, Korea's financial supervisory system was largely fragmented, with the banking, securities, insurance, and non-bank sectors individually managed and regulated by a separate agency. Furthermore, the authority of supervision was split between two governing entities, i.e. the supervisory agencies and the Ministry of Finance and Economy (formerly known as the Ministry of Finance; currently the Ministry of Strategy and Finance). Under this segregated supervisory system, the banking sector was overseen by the Bank of Korea and the ministry, the securities sector by the Securities Supervisory Board and the ministry, and the insurance sector by the Insurance Supervisory Board and the ministry. As to non-bank financial institutions established after the 1970s, the overall authority lay with the ministry while functions of examination were delegated to the Banking Supervisory Authority within the Bank of Korea and the Korea Non-Bank Deposit Insurance Corporation.

=== Establishment of Financial Supervisory Service (FSS) ===
The end of the 1980s marked a time of diversification in the financial industry and businesses' crossover into other financial sectors. Meanwhile, the financial environment changed considerably with the opening of markets to foreign investments and the ongoing march of globalization. This led to an increasing number of complex financial transactions – such as derivatives – that blurred the boundaries of banking, securities, and insurance. The multifarious financial supervisory system of the past, in which the banking, securities, and insurance sectors were each regulated by their respective supervisory agencies, was no longer fit to address the innovations in the financial environment. As a result, the government established the Presidential Committee on Financial Reform in 1997, which announced a final report detailing the following recommendations for reform of the financial supervisory system:

- Consolidation of the existing supervisory agencies into one organization to better deal with market liberalization, business expansion into other financial sectors, and the rising uncertainty in the market;
- Establishment of an autonomous financial supervisory authority independent from macroeconomic, monetary and credit policies;
- Proper distribution of responsibilities and strengthened cooperation among related agencies

Following the guidelines set forth by the committee's report, the government drafted financial reform bills in August 1997. Based on a recommendation by the International Monetary Fund to establish an integrated financial supervisory body, the National Assembly passed the bill on December 29, 1997. On April 1, 1998, the Financial Supervisory Commission (the predecessor to the Financial Services Commission) was launched as the FSS's supreme decision-making body, laying the groundwork for the consolidation of the four supervisory bodies (the Banking Supervisory Authority, Securities Supervisory Board, Insurance Supervisory Board, and the Non-bank Deposit Insurance Corporation. To preserve sectoral characteristics while flexibly addressing businesses' branching into other sectors, a committee of executives and staff from the four supervisory bodies was put together to work out a plan for the consolidated agency. On January 2, 1999, the Financial Supervisory Service (FSS) was finally established.

=== Major progress ===
The consolidation of the financial supervisory system helped Korea to quickly and efficiently recover from the 1997 Asian financial crisis. The FSS led an intensive restructuring of the financial industry, eliminating insolvent financial companies and putting the financial system back on track. Over a six-year period extending from 1998 to 2003, 840 financial companies – including 14 banks – were removed from the market through M&As, P&As, or liquidation. To combat increased corporate insolvency resulting from the 1997 Asian financial crisis, the FSS successfully headed a corporate restructuring drive that implemented a series of measures like the improvement of conglomerates' financial structure, liquidation of failing companies, and workout program. The FSS also reacted expeditiously to the credit card crunch and market distress of 2003 – caused by excessive credit card business expansion – by strengthening prudent supervision of credit card companies and encouraging the development of M&As in order to prevent uncertainty from spreading throughout the financial market. The integrated supervisory agency also facilitated a systematic application and supervision of programs introduced in the aftermath of the crisis, such as forward-looking criteria (FLC), a system of financial holding companies, and the retirement pension plan. In enforcing prudent regulations such as prompt corrective action, business management evaluation, and capital adequacy ratio, it was also able to coordinate and maintain equity across financial sectors.

== Purpose ==
=== Purpose ===
The purpose of the Financial Supervisory Service is to contribute to the growth of the national economy by 1) promoting the advancement of the financial industry and the stability of financial markets; 2) establishing sound credit order and fair financial transaction practices; and 3) protecting financial consumers, such as depositors. (Article 1, Act on the Establishment, etc. of Financial Services Commission)

=== Legal status ===
The FSS was established for a special purpose and is legally based on the Act on the Establishment, etc. of Financial Services Commission. It administers public affairs independent from the central and regional governments of Korea. The intended effect of its legal status as an independent public entity rather than a governmental operation is twofold: 1) to minimize government interference of the FSS's supervision of financial institutions; and 2) to ensure a fair and independent execution of its supervisory services.

== Management and structure ==
=== Executives (as of May 14, 2012) ===
Its current governor Kwon Hyouk-Se was named to his position in March 2011 after a career of nearly three decades in finance-related positions in the government, including with the Ministry of Finance and Economy (Mofe), predecessor to the Ministry of Strategy and Finance, and the Financial Services Commission.

Kwon Hyouk-Se, Governor
Park Soo Won, Chief Executive Auditor
Choi Soo Hyun, First Senior Deputy Governor
Ho Joong Kim, Chief Accountant

=== Organizational structure (as of June 13, 2012) ===
The FSS headquarters in Seoul has 38 departments, and 13 offices. Regional offices are in operation in Busan, Daegu, Gwangju, and Daejeon, and representative offices in Jeonju, Chuncheon, Chungju, and Jeju. The FSS is also present in New York, London, Tokyo, and Beijing, and has residing staff in Washington D.C., Frankfurt and Hong Kong. The FSS established Financial Consumer Protection Agency directly reporting to and under the supervision of the Governor on May 15, 2012, independent of supervision and examination divisions.

=== Deliberation and advisory committees ===
==== Financial Disputes Settlement Committee ====
Pursuant to Article 51 of the Act on the Establishment, etc. of Financial Services Commission, the Financial Disputes Settlement Committee is a quasi-judicial body established within the FSS to promptly and fairly resolve financial disputes among users of financial institutions. When a user of or a party concerned with a financial institution applies for a settlement of a dispute, the committee will, depending on the nature of dispute, either recommend the parties involved to reach an agreement or deliberate to resolve the dispute upon verification of facts. The committee is composed of up to 30 members, including an FSS deputy governor who serves as the committee chairman. Other members of the committee include assistant deputy governors of the FSS and specialists representing the legal profession, customer groups, financial sectors, academia, and other relevant sectors. As an out-of-court dispute resolution body, the Financial Disputes Settlement Committee assumes a voluntary role in dispute mediation. However, when both parties to a dispute accept a mediator's proposal, the proposal carries the same effect as an in-court settlement. In this sense, the functions performed by the committee can be said to be quasi-judicial. (Section 5 "Mediation of Financial Disputes," Act on the Establishment, etc. Of Financial Services Commission).

==== Sanctions Review Committee ====
The Sanctions Review Committee advises the Governor of the FSS regarding deliberation of sanctions pursuant to the Regulations on Examination and Sanctions of Financial Institutions. Charged with deliberating a variety of possible sanctions instituted by the Financial Services Commission and/or the Governor of the Financial Supervisory Service, whether against a business' operations or employees, or financial sanctions, the committee is operated to ensure the fairness and equity of sanction measures. The committee is composed of nine members: head and deputy head of sanctions deliberation, head of case presentation, FSS legal advisor (these four members are internal members), FSC representative in charge of case presentation, and four external members chosen from among lawyers, professors, and/or financial experts with professional knowledge of finance-related statutes or scholarship and experience in finance. The three external members are appointed by the Governor of the FSS. Meetings of the committee shall be convened whenever a majority of its members deems it necessary, and resolutions are passed by majority consent of all attending members.

== Major functions ==
FSS acts as the executive supervisor for the FSC and principally carries out examination of financial institutions along with enforcement and other oversight activities as directed or charged by the FSC.

- Supervision of financial institutions: (Preliminary) review of license applications (for bank, non-bank, financial investment company, insurance company, credit card company, financial holding company, or any other kind of financial institution), review of the terms and conditions of financial institutions; supervision of the soundness of business management and business activities
- Examination of financial institutions: Analysis and evaluation of financial companies' business activities, financial position, and risk management capacity; verification of companies' compliance with relevant statutes
- Supervision of the capital market: Operation of disclosure system to maintain the sound operation of primary and secondary markets for marketable securities; capital market investigation to prevent unfair trade practices
- Supervision of accounting: Alignment of accounting standards to international accounting standards to achieve enhanced transparency; supervision of accounting to ensure a fair operation of the external audit system
- Protection of customers of financial services: Consultation and handling of customer complaints regarding financial services; protection of customer rights through dispute mediation; financial education of consumers

== External relations ==
=== Financial Services Commission ===
The Financial Services Commission (FSC) is a central public administration agency falling under the jurisdiction of the Office of the Prime Minister, and is charged with the deliberation and determination of financial policies and other important matters of financial supervision – such as the supervision, examination, and sanctioning of financial institutions, and authorization and licensing of financial institutions. Pursuant to the relevant legal provisions, the FSC may direct and supervise the operations of the FSS. In addition to its inherent responsibilities of supervising and sanctioning financial institutions, the FSS supports the operations of the FSC and its adjoined Securities & Futures Commission, and executes those FSC duties which are entrusted by the FSC to the FSS. (Article 37, Act on the Establishment, etc. of Financial Services Commission)
Prior to February 2008, the law provided that the Chairman of the Financial Supervisory Commission (the predecessor to the Financial Services Commission) be concurrently appointed as the Governor of the FSS, with the FSS directly assisting the operations of the commission. The revision of the Act in February 2008 clearly distinguishes the policy-making function of the FSC and the supervisory enforcement function of FSS, and provides that different persons be assigned to head each organization to ensure more effective checks and balances (Article 29 (2) of the Act). The revision also provides that the Governor of FSS may, as an ex-officio member of the FSC, request to the FSC chairman that matters necessary within the scope of FSS operation be included in the commission's agenda.

=== Bank of Korea ===
The Bank of Korea may, when the Monetary Policy Committee deems it necessary for the implementation of monetary and credit policies, request the FSS to perform an examination of a bank and/or other financial institutions, or ask that its staff jointly participate in an FSS-led examination. The Bank of Korea may also request the FSS to send the result of examination and ask for certain necessary corrective measures based on the results. When the FSC takes measures that are directly related to monetary and/or credit policies, the Bank of Korea may ask for reconsideration of the measures if it has any objections.
Following the September 2009 signing of the memorandum of understanding (MOU) on information sharing and joint examination among the FSS, the Bank of Korea, the Ministry of Strategy and Finance, the FSC, and the Korea Deposit Insurance Corporation, the FSS and the Bank of Korea agreed to widen the range of information shared between the entities and increase cooperation to promptly execute joint examinations for emergency cases.

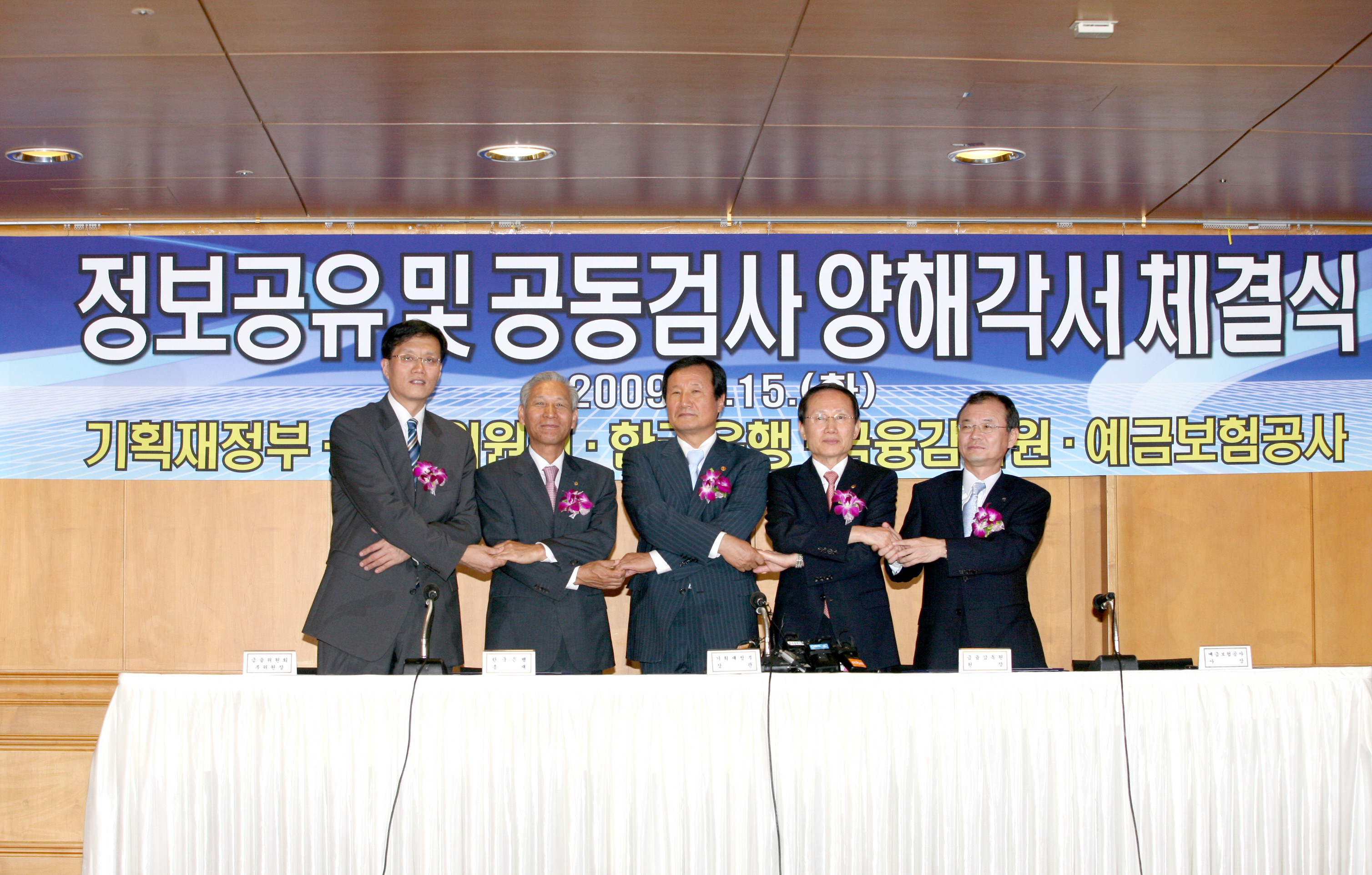
FSS signs a memorandum of understanding on information sharing and joint examination with FSC, BOK, and KDIC.

=== Korea Deposit Insurance Corporation ===
The Korea Deposit Insurance Corporation may, when deemed necessary for its operation, request the FSS to perform an examination of insured financial companies or ask that its staff jointly participate in an FSS-led examination. Based on the aforementioned MOU, the Korea Deposit Insurance Corporation and FSS share the financial information of financial companies with each other.

=== Korea Asset Management Corporation ===
The FSC supervises the Korea Asset Management Corporation (KAMCO), gives directives in relation to its supervision, and receives reports from the corporation on its operations, accounting, and assets. Under instruction of the FSC, the Governor of the FSS may examine the operations, accounting, and assets of KAMCO.

== Current issues ==
=== Early recovery from the crisis ===
Even before the 2008 financial crisis, the key policy objective of the FSS was to stabilize the financial market and enhance the health and soundness of Korea's financial institutions. During the recent period of credit expansion, the FSS took a series of strengthened measures of prudency such as Loan-to-Value (LTV) and Debt-to-Income DTI regulations in March 2006 and the 30% rule restricting savings banks’ project finance (PF) loans in August 2006. From August 2007, when the sub-prime mortgage crisis emerged in the United States, the FSS established and operated a comprehensive monitoring system to track new market developments.

In September 2008, due to the 2008 financial crisis, the FSS committed itself to market stabilization to ensure an early recovery. It operated a round-the-clock monitoring system that was linked with its offices overseas, government agencies, and financial institutions, while closely coordinating policies with the relevant organizations to promptly deal with potential instability factors. The FSS also established a contingency examination system that required its examination competence to focus on preventing systemic risks; its on-site general examination functions were deferred to accommodate the screening of potential risks.

In October 2008, the FSS set up the Foreign Debt Service Guarantee Task Force, thereby working to quickly recover the finance sector's intermediary role by improving banks' liquidity ratio and helping to ease the domestic and foreign liquidity crunch faced by local companies. To prevent bad loans from accumulating, the FSS urged banks to maintain a Bank for International Settlements (BIS) ratio of 12% or higher and a Tier 1 capital ratio of 9% or higher as of end of 2008.

The 2008 financial crisis was also an opportunity to crack down on unsound business practices that contributed to increased volatility in the foreign currency and stock markets. To ward off unwarranted concerns that served to undermine market confidence, the FSS regularly organized conference calls and issue briefings for domestic and international institutional investors and analysts, as well as briefings for the foreign press.

=== Corporate restructuring ===
The expiration of the old Corporate Restructuring Promotion Act at the end of 2005 highlighted the need to address the limitations of creditor banks' sole discretion over corporate restructuring. As a result, the new Corporate Restructuring Promotion Act was enacted in November 2007. After the fall of Lehman Brothers in September 2008 and the resulting shortage of liquidity and economic recession, industries particularly susceptible to global economic cycles – such as construction, shipbuilding, and shipping – were in dire need of restructuring. In November 2008, the FSS organized the Corporate Credit Task Force in a joint FSS-FSC undertaking to ease businesses' financial distress and improve their financial position. In December of the same year, the FSS announced directives and policies for major corporate restructuring. From January to April 2009, credit risk evaluations were conducted on construction companies, shipbuilders, and shipping companies faced with solvency risks. Based on the results of the evaluations, 46 companies were placed on a corporate workout procedure. By the end of September 2009, six of the companies had been normalized, 17 were still undergoing the workout, and 23 were in the process of court receivership. Subsequent to the industry-specific restructuring drive, the FSS also initiated a restructuring process for the corporate sector at large. Large individual companies with outstanding credit lines of 50 billion won or more were subjected to credit risk evaluations; of 433 companies, 33 were selected for restructuring. By the end of September 2009, three had completed the workout program, 13 were in the process of normalizing their operations through workout, and 17 were in the process of court receivership program. Given the large number of small and medium-sized enterprises (SMEs) and the limited availability of information on which to determine restructuring, SME credit risk evaluations were performed in different stages based on the size of credit loans. In July 2009, the first round of evaluations screened 861 companies that were subject to external audits and had in excess of 5 billion won in debt; of them, 113 were selected for restructuring. In the second round of evaluations that ended in September 2009, 1,461 companies subject to external audits and carrying 3 billion won or more in debts were screened, of which 174 were ordered to restructure. In the third round of evaluations that ended in December 2009, companies subject to external audits with debts of 1 billion won or more and those not subject to external audits but with debts of 3 billion won or more were screened; of the 1,842 companies screened, 225 were selected to undergo restructuring.

=== Microfinance and SME support ===
In an effort to assist with the financial needs of low-income groups severely hit by the 2008 financial crisis, the FSS launched the Microfinance 119 Service (s119.fss.or.kr) on its portal website in March 2009. The website was designed to offer microfinance information and other related services to low-income earners. The portal website offers eight services, including loan information, free credit checks, information on voice phishing fraud, checks on legally established financial institutions, financial knowledge, credit recovery programs, rehabilitation support programs, and reports of illegal financial practices.
To ensure that the services can be accessed from a wider range of channels – for the convenience of service users – the FSS linked its portal service to the websites of 370 financial institutions. The Microfinance 119 Service extended individually tailored loans to 33,000 customers, absorbing 14.2 billion won of illegal private loans into the established market in the process. The portal also contributed to promoting the Hope Loan program, offered in cooperation with financial institutions. From March 1, 2009, to December 4, 2009, 201,774 customers with low credit ratings or low income levels received a combined total of 1.18 trillion won in loans through the program. (FSS's Microfinance 119 Service website)

The FSS also took a series of measures to strengthen the lines of support to small- and medium-sized enterprises (SMEs) in times of liquidity shortage during the 2008 financial crisis. Working jointly with the Korea Federation of Banks and other organizations, the FSS introduced the SME Fast Track program in October 2008, injecting a combined liquidity of 2.82 trillion won to 1,672 SMEs by the end of 2008. By coordinating policies with the FSC and other relevant agencies, and enlisting the active cooperation of the financial sector, the FSS helped to increase the guarantee amount from guarantee institutions and to extend the maturity of SME loans. Thanks to the combination of SME support measures, SME loans increased by 52.4 trillion won in 2008 – despite the bleak economic circumstances of the 2008 financial crisis – which is comparable with the average increase of 56.7 trillion won in 2006 and 2007.

== Supervisory objectives ==
The FSS is geared to emphasize on-site supervision and examinations in its commitment to establishing itself as financial regulator that markets and consumers trust. The FSS will strengthen prudential supervision to prevent worsening economic and financial conditions from leading to financial distress in companies. The FSS will provide more financial support for low-income people and SMEs, particularly vulnerable to economic recession, and concentrate on strengthening consumer protection.
The FSS is hosting such regular events as Heart-to-Heart Talk and Campus Talk on Finance in its efforts to share thoughts and increase direct communication with financial consumers and markets.
The FSS has set up five objectives for this year's supervisory guidelines and they are as follows.
1.Stabilizing Financial System
In its efforts to better brace for worsening global and domestic conditions including euro-zone debt crisis, the FSS will strengthen foreign currency liquidity management and encourage financial companies to have more ability to absorb losses by setting aside more loan loss provisions.
2.Protecting Financial Consumers
The FSS will earthen unreasonable practices embedded across the financial sector to correct them, and conduct more mystery shopping for five financial instruments that frequently incur losses to consumers.
3.Protecting Low-income People and SMEs
The FSS will intensify crackdown on illegal financial acts against low-income people and help reduce financial difficulties of SMEs by creating a level playing field between large companies and SMEs.
4.Innovating Supervisory System
Financial companies will be encouraged to bring their corporate governance in line with global standards and place a high premium on corporate social responsibility. The FSS will help attract global financial companies to domestic market and give support to domestic companies making inroads into global markets.
5.Open-minded Communications with Market Players
The FSS will press ahead with a comprehensive overhaul of the supervisory framework and better communication with consumers to restore confidence.

== See also ==
- List of financial supervisory authorities by country
