= Yecheon County =

Coordinates: 36°39′20″N 128°27′25″E

Yecheon
- County
- Panoramic view of Yecheon-eup

- Flag Emblem of Yecheon

- Location in South Korea
- Country: South Korea
- Region: Yeongnam
- Administrative divisions: 1 eup, 11 myeon

Area
  - Total: 660.7 km^{2} (255.1 sq mi)

Population (September 2024)
  - Total: 54,873
  - Density: 87.9/km^{2} (228/sq mi)
  - Dialect: Gyeongsang

Korean name
- Hangul: 예천군
- Hanja: 醴泉郡
- RR: Yecheon-gun
- MR: Yech'ŏn-gun

Yecheon County (Korean: 예천군) is a county in the province of North Gyeongsang, South Korea. It is 661 km^{2} in area, and in 2004 had a population of 52,311. It has lost over two-third of its inhabitants since the mid-1960s. It consists of twelve administrative districts (11 myeon and one eup). The county borders Yeongju city to the northeast, Andong city to the east, Uiseong county to the southeast, Mungyeong city to the west, Sangju city to the southwest, and Danyang county of North Chungcheong province to the northwest.

== Administrative divisions ==
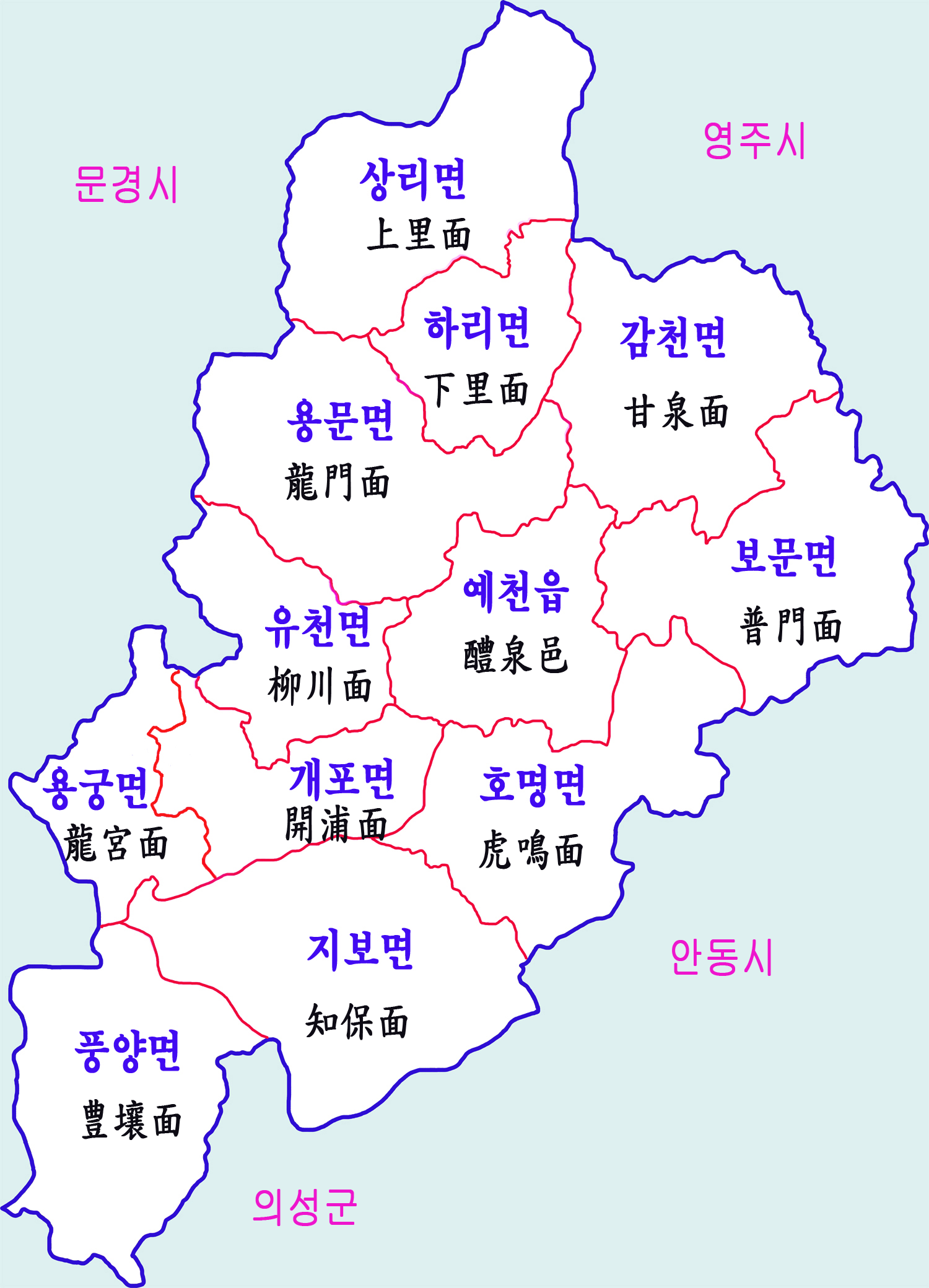

Yecheon is divided into twelve primary divisions: one eup (large village) and eleven rural districts (myeon).

Name	Hangeul	Hanguk
Yecheon-eup	예천읍	醴泉邑
Yongmun-myeon	용문면	龍門面
Hyoja-myeon	효자면	孝子面
Eunpung-myeon	은풍면	殷豊面
Gamcheon-myeon	감천면	甘泉面
Bomun-myeon	보문면	普門面
Homyeong-myeon	호명면	虎鳴面
Yucheon-myeon	유천면	柳川面
Yonggung-myeon	용궁면	龍宮面
Gaepo-myeon	개포면	開浦面
Jibo-myeon	지보면	知保面
Pungyang-myeon	풍양면	豊壤面

The eup and myeon are further divided into numerous small villages (ri).

- Yecheon-eup (예천읍) - Noha-ri (노하리), Nosang-ri (노상리), Baekjeon-ri (백전리), Dongbon-ri (동본리), Nambon-ri (남본리), Sabon-ri (서본리), Daeshim-ri (대심리), Seokjeong-ri (석정리), Jinae-ri (지내리), Sangdong-ri (상동리), Wangshin-ri (왕신리), Cheongbok-ri (청복리), Gopyeong-ri (고평리), Tongmyeong-ri (통명리), Ugye-ri (우계리), Galgu-ri (갈구리), Saengcheon-ri (생천리), Yongsan-ri (용산리)
- Yongmun-myeon (용문면) - Sanggeumgok-ri (상금곡리), Hageumgok-ri (하금곡리), Seonghyeon-ri (성현리), Deoksin-ri (덕신리), Bangsong-ri (방송리), Nosa-ri (노사리), Gugye-ri (구계리), Jukrim-ri (죽림리), Jik-ri (직리), Ducheon-ri (두천리), Sabuk-ri (사부리), Naeji-ri (내지리), Wonryu-ri (원류리), Seon-ri (선리), Neungcheon-ri (능천리), Jegok-ri (제곡리), Daeje-ri (대제리), Hahak-ri (하학리)
- Hyoja-myeon (효자면) - Dochon-ri (도촌리), Sagok-ri (사곡리), Myeongbong-ri (명봉리), Yongdu-ri (용두리), Duseong-ri (두성리), Baekseok-ri (백석리), Chohang-ri (초항리), Gohang-ri (고항리), Seokmyo-ri 석묘리, Bogok-ri (보곡리)
- Eunpung-myeon (은풍면) - Ugok-ri (우곡리), Tap-ri (탑리), Dongsa-ri (동사리), Eunsan-ri (은산리), Songwol-ri (송월리), Geumgok-ri (금곡리), Oryu-ri (오류리), Yulgok-ri (율곡리), Bucho-ri (부초리), Sihang-ri (시항리)
- Gamcheon-myeon (감천면) - Po-ri (포리), Deokyul-ri-ri (덕율리), Gwanhyeon-ri (관현리), Cheonhyang-ri (천향리), Jinpyeong-ri (진평리), Beolbang-ri (벌방리), Suhan-ri (수한리), Nyeonnae-ri (현내리), Jeunggeo-ri (증거리), Donsan-ri (돈산리), Yu-ri (유리), Miseok-ri (미석리), Daemaek-ri (대맥리), Jangsan-ri (장산리), Machon-ri (마촌리)
- Bomun-myeon (보문면) - Miho-ri (미호리), Sinwol-ri (신월리), Seungbon-ri ( 승본리), Ganbang-ri (간방리), Okcheon-ri (옥천리), Dokyang-ri (독양리), Gigok-ri (기곡리), Urae-ri (우래리), Sanseong-ri (산성리), Usin-ri (오신리), Sugye-ri (수계리), Jakgok-ri (작곡리), Oam-ri (오암리)
- Homyeong-myeon (호명면) - Bonpo-ri (본포리), Wongok-ri (원곡리), Songgok-ri (송곡리), Geumneung-ri (금능리), Haneo-ri (한어리), Bon-ri (본리), Hyeongho-ri (형호리), Ocheon-ri (오천리), Baeksong-ri (백송리), Sanhap-ri (산합리), Jiksan-ri (직산리), Hwangji-ri (황지리), Wolpo-ri (월포리), Jongsan-ri (종산리), Naesin-ri (내신리), Damam-ri (담암리)
- Yucheon-myeon (유천면) - Hwaji-ri (화지리), Gosan-ri (고산리), Seongpyeong-ri (성평리), Gwangjeon-ri (광전리), Songi-ri (손기리), Susim-ri (수심리), Songjeon-ri (송전리), Jungpyeong-ri (중평리), Jukan-ri (죽안리), Macheon-ri (마천리), Hwajeon-ri (화전리), Sagok-ri (사곡리), Gorim-ri (고림리), Songji-ri (송지리), Yulhyeon-ri (율현리), Yeoncheon-ri (연천리), Yongam-ri (용암리), Chojeon-ri (초적리), Aesan-ri (매산리), Ga-ri (가리)
- Yonggung-myeon (용궁면) - Eupbu-ri (읍부리), Geumnam-ri (금남리), Gaya-ri (가야리), Mui-ri (무이리), Daeeum-ri (대은리), Hyangseok-ri (향석리), Muji-ri (무지리), Santaek-ri (산택리), Woro-ri (월오리), Songam-ri (송암리), Deokgye-ri (덕계리)
- Gaepo-myeon (개포면) - Geum-ri (금리), Gyeongjin-ri (경진리), Dongsong-ri (동송리), Isa-ri (이사리), Ugam-ri (우감리), Sineum-ri (신음리), Gagok-ri (가곡리), Hwangsan-ri (황산리), Jangsong-ri (장송리), Ipap-ri (입압리), Galma-ri (갈마리), Pungjeong-ri (풍정리)
- Jibo-myeon (지보면) - Sohwa-ri (소화리), Majeon-ri (마전리), Jipo-ri (지보리), Dojang-ri (도장리), Dohwa-ri (도화리), Sinpung-ri (신풍리), Daejuk-ri (대죽리), Amcheon-ri (암천리), Eosin-ri (어신리), Songpyeong-ri (송평리), Suwol-ri (수월리), Sangwol-ri (상월리), Manhwa-ri (만화리), Maechang-ri (매창리), Masan-ri (마산리)
- Pungyang-myeon (풍양면) - Umang-ri (우망리), Cheonggok-ri (청곡리), Heunhyo-ri (흔효리), Heungun-ri (흥천리), Cheongun-ri (청운리), Hapung-ri (하풍리), Samgang-ri (삼강리), Uji-ri (오지리), Pungsin-ri (풍신리), Goedang-ri (괴당리), Gosan-ri (고산리), Gongdak-ri (공덕리), Naksang-ri (낙상리), Waryong-ri (와룡리), Hyogal-ri (효갈리)

== Notable people ==
- Kim Jong-chang, former governor of South Korea's Financial Supervisory Service
- Sung Deuk Hahm, Dean of the Graduate School of Political Studies and Naun professor of political science and law at Kyonggi University
