= History of wine =

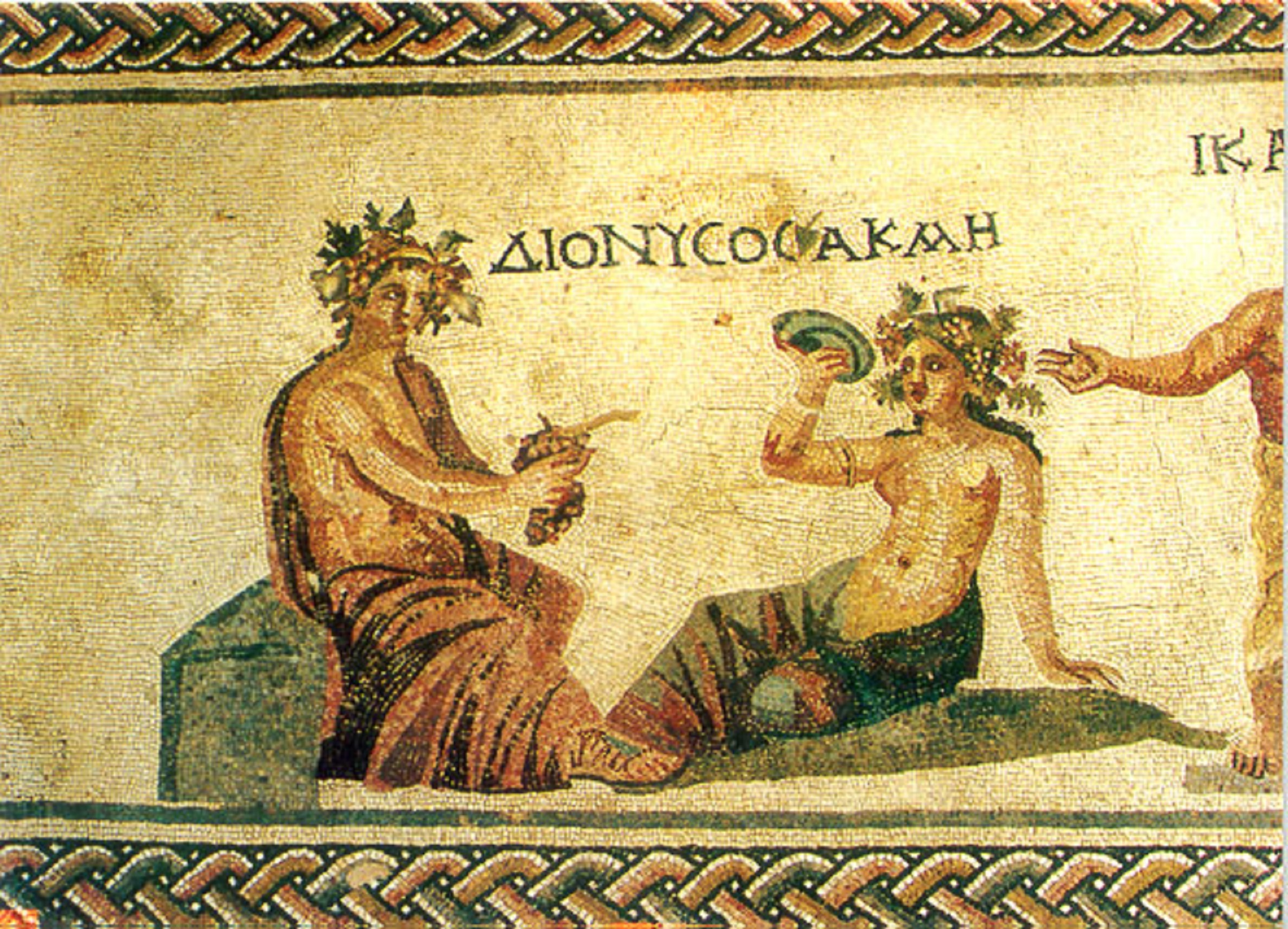
Hellenistic mosaics discovered close to the city of Paphos depicting Dionysos, god of wine

The earliest known traces of wine were found near Tbilisi, Georgia (c. 6000 BCE). The earliest known winery, from c. 4100 BCE, is the Areni-1 winery in Armenia. The subsequent spread of wine culture around the Mediterranean was probably due to the influence of the Phoenicians (from c. 1000 BCE) and Greeks (from c. 600 BCE). The Phoenicians exported the wines of Byblos, which were known for their quality into Roman times. Industrialized production of wine in ancient Greece spread across the Italian peninsula and to southern Gaul. The ancient Romans further increased the scale of wine production and trade networks, especially in Gaul around the time of the Gallic Wars. The Romans discovered that burning sulfur candles inside empty wine vessels kept them fresh and free from a vinegar smell, due to the antioxidant effects of sulfur dioxide, which is still used as a wine preservative.

The altered consciousness produced by wine has been considered religious since its origin. The ancient Greeks worshiped Dionysus or Bacchus and the Ancient Romans carried on his cult. Consumption of ritual wine, probably a certain type of sweet wine originally, was part of Jewish practice since Biblical times and, as part of the eucharist commemorating Jesus's Last Supper, became even more essential to the Christian Church. Although Islam nominally forbade the production or consumption of wine, during its Golden Age, alchemists such as Geber pioneered wine's distillation for medicinal and industrial purposes such as the production of perfume.

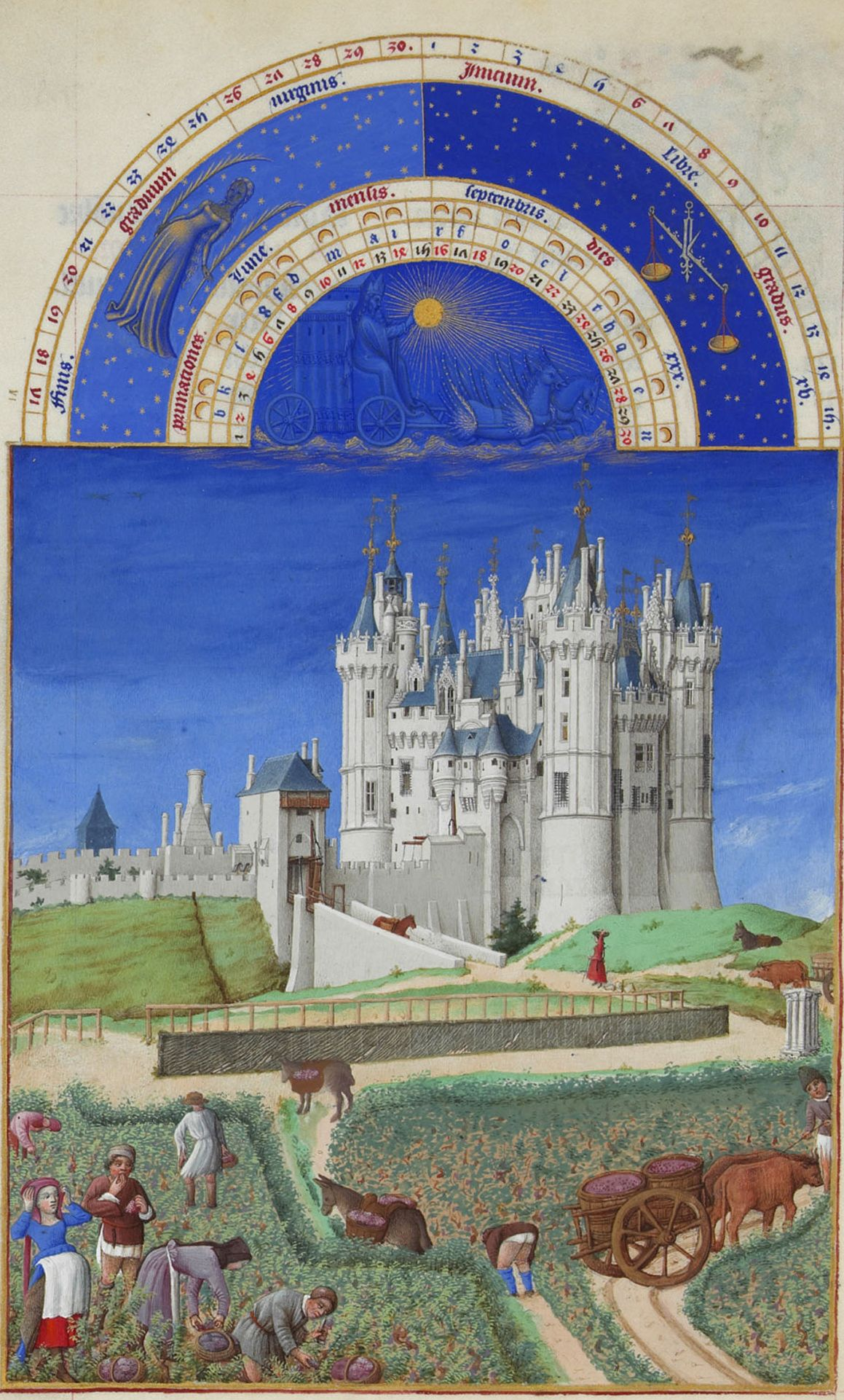
Grape harvesting at Château de Saumur, depicted in Les Très Riches Heures du duc de Berry (c. 1416)

In medieval Europe, monks grew grapes and made wine for the Eucharist. Monasteries expanded their land holdings over time and established vineyards in many of today's most successful wine regions. Bordeaux was a notable exception, being a purely commercial enterprise serving the Duchy of Aquitaine and by association Britain between the 12th and 15th centuries.

European wine grape traditions were incorporated into New World wine, with colonists planting vineyards in order to celebrate the Eucharist. Vineyards were established in Mexico by 1530, Peru by the 1550s and Chile shortly afterwards. The European settlement of South Africa and subsequent trade involving the Dutch East India Company led to the planting of vines in 1655. British colonists attempted to establish vineyards in Virginia in 1619, but were unable to due to the native phylloxera pest, and downy and powdery mildew. Jesuit Missionaries managed to grow vines in California in the 1670s, and plantings were later established in Los Angeles in the 1820s and Napa and Sonoma in the 1850s. Arthur Phillip introduced vines to Australia in 1788, and viticulture was widely practised by the 1850s. The Australian missionary Samuel Marsden introduced vines to New Zealand in 1819.

The 17th century saw developments which made the glass wine bottle practical, with advances in glassmaking and use of cork stoppers and corkscrews, allowing wine to be aged over time – hitherto impossible in the opened barrels which cups had been filled from. The subsequent centuries saw a boom in the wine trade, especially in the mid-to-late 19th century in Italy, Spain and California.

The Great French Wine Blight began in the latter half of the 19th century, caused by an infestation of the aphid phylloxera brought over from America, whose louse stage feeds on vine roots and eventually kills the plant. Almost every vine in Europe needed to be replaced, by necessity grafted onto American rootstock which is naturally resistant to the pest. This practise continues to this day, with the exception of a small number of phylloxera-free wine regions such as South Australia.

The subsequent decades saw further issues impact the wine trade, with the rise of prohibitionism, political upheaval and two world wars, and economic depression and protectionism. The co-operative movement gained traction with winemakers during the interwar period, and the Institut national de l'origine et de la qualité was established in 1947 to oversee the administration of France's appellation laws, the first to create comprehensive restrictions on grape varieties, maximum yields, alcoholic strength and vinification techniques. After the Second World War, the wine market improved; all major producing countries adopted appellation laws, which increased consumer confidence, and winemakers focused on quality and marketing as consumers became more discerning and wealthy. New World wines, previously dominated by a few large producers, began to fill a niche in the market, with small producers meeting the demand for high quality small-batch artisanal wines. A consumer culture has emerged, supporting wine-related publications, wine tourism, paraphernalia such as preservation devices and storage solutions, and educational courses.

== Prehistory ==
=== Vine domestication ===
The origins of wine predate written records, and modern archaeology is still uncertain about the details of the first cultivation of wild grapevines. It has been hypothesized that early humans climbed trees to pick berries, liked their sugary flavor, and then began collecting them. After a few days with fermentation setting in, juice at the bottom of any container would begin producing low-alcohol wine. According to this theory, things changed around 10,000–8000 BC with the transition from a nomadic to a sedentary style of living, which led to agriculture and wine domestication.

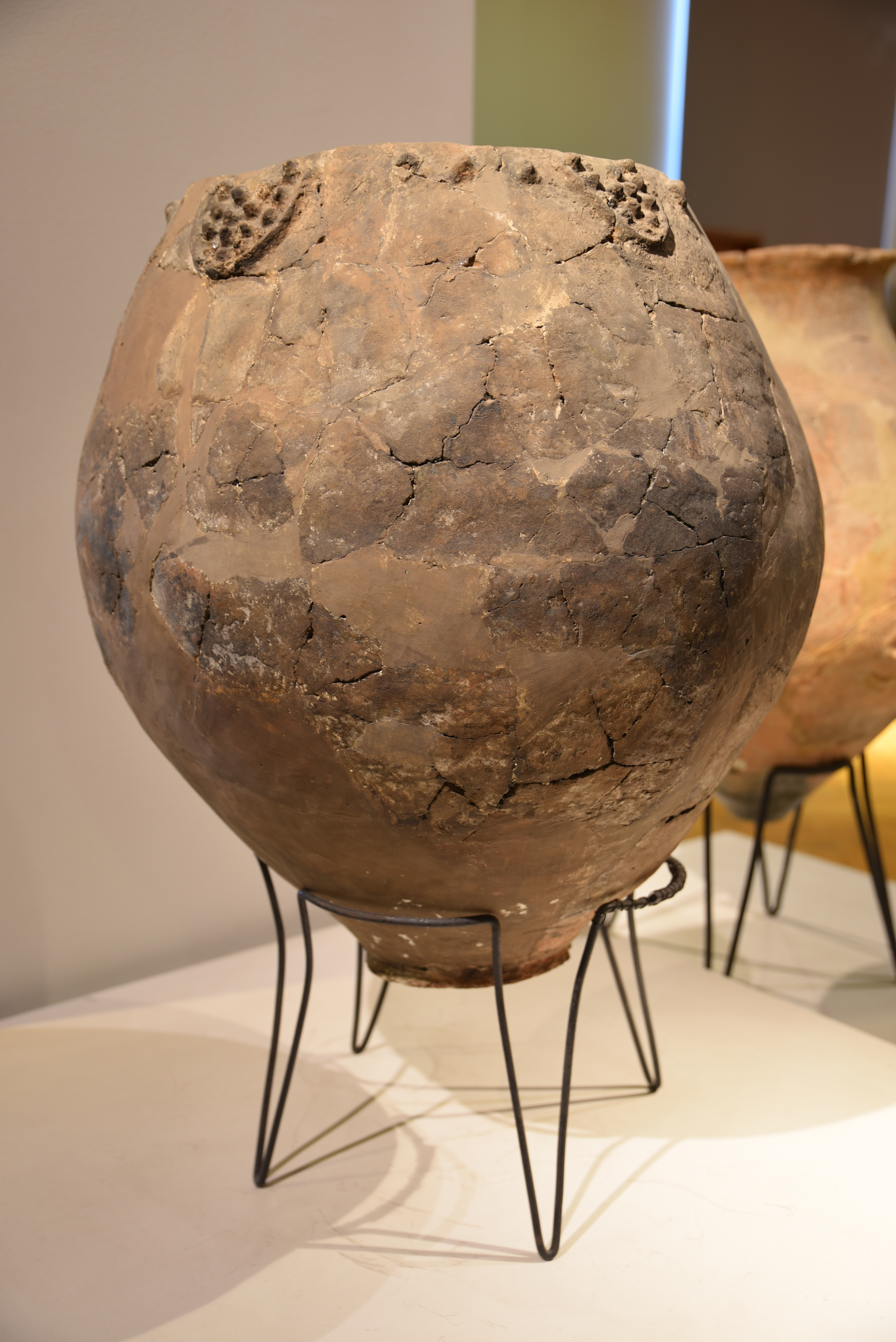
Georgian Kvevri, a jar dated to the 6th millennium BC found at the Shulaveri site (Georgian National Museum).

The earliest act of cultivation appears to have been the favoring of hermaphroditic members of the Vitis vinifera species over the barren male vines and the female vines, which were dependent on a nearby male for pollination. With the ability to pollinate itself, over time the hermaphroditic vines were able to sire offspring that were consistently hermaphroditic.

=== Wine fermentation ===
The earliest archaeological evidence of wine fermentation found has been at sites in Georgia (c. 6000 BC), Hajj Firuz, West Azerbaijan province of Iran (c. 5000 BC), Greece (c. 4500 BC), and Sicily (c. 4000 BC). The earliest evidence of steady production of wine has been found in Armenia (c. 4100 BC) while the earliest evidence of a grape and rice mixed-based fermented drink was found in ancient China (c. 7000 BC). The Iranian jars, which contained a form of retsina, using turpentine pine resin to more effectively seal and preserve the wine, are the earliest firm evidence of wine production to date. Production spread to other sites in Greater Iran and Greek Macedonia by c. 4500 BC. The Greek site is notable for the recovery at the site of the remnants of crushed grapes.

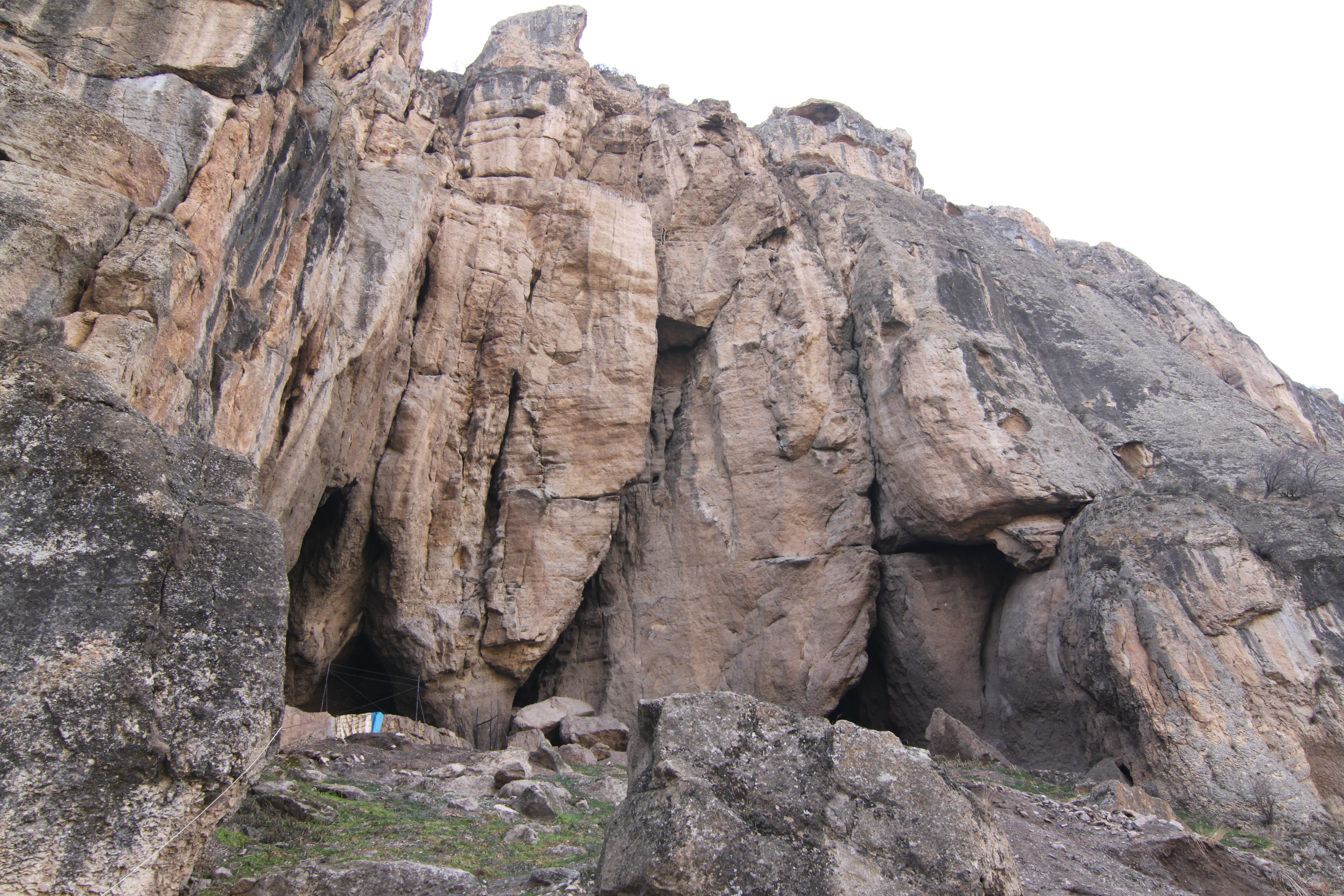
Entrance to the Areni-1 cave in southern Armenia near the town of Areni where a winery dated to c. 4100 BC was found in 2007.

The oldest-known winery was discovered in the "Areni-1" cave in Vayots Dzor, Armenia. Dated to c. 4100 BC, the site contained a wine press, fermentation vats, jars, and cups. Archaeologists also found V. vinifera seeds and vines. Commenting on the importance of the find, McGovern said, "The fact that winemaking was already so well developed in 4000 BC suggests that the technology probably goes back much earlier."

The seeds were from Vitis vinifera, a grape still used to make wine. The cave remains date to about 4000 BC. This is nine hundred years before the earliest comparable wine remains, found in Egyptian tombs.

Domesticated grapes were abundant in the Near East from the beginning of the early Bronze Age, starting in 3200 BC. There is increasingly abundant evidence for winemaking in Sumer and Egypt in the 3rd millennium BC.

=== Legends of discovery ===
There are many etiological myths told about the first cultivation of the grapevine and fermentation of wine.

The Biblical Book of Genesis first mentions the production of wine by Noah following the Great Flood.

Greek mythology placed the childhood of Dionysus and his discovery of viticulture at Mount Nysa but had him teach the practice to the peoples of central Anatolia. Because of this, he was rewarded to become a god of wine.

In Persian legend, King Jamshid banished a lady of his harem, causing her to become despondent and contemplate suicide. Going to the king's warehouse, the woman sought out a jar marked "poison" containing the remnants of the grapes that had spoiled and were now deemed undrinkable. After drinking the fermented wine, she found her spirits lifted. She took her discovery to the king, who became so enamored of his new drink that he not only accepted the woman back but also decreed that all grapes grown in Persepolis would be devoted to winemaking.

== Antiquity ==
=== Ancient China ===
A 2003 report by archaeologists indicates a possibility that grapes were mixed with rice to produce fermented drinks in ancient China in the early years of the seventh millennium BCE. Pottery jars from the Neolithic site of Jiahu, Henan, contained traces of tartaric acid and other organic compounds commonly found in wine. However, other fruits indigenous to the region, such as hawthorn, cannot be ruled out. If these drinks, which seem to be the precursors of rice wine, included grapes rather than other fruits, they would have been any of the several dozen indigenous wild species in China, rather than Vitis vinifera, which was introduced 6000 years later.

Archaeologists have discovered production from native "mountain grapes" like V. thunbergii and V. filifolia during the 1st millennium BC. Production of beer had largely disappeared by the time of the Han dynasty, in favor of stronger drinks fermented from millet, rice, and other grains. Although these huangjiu have frequently been translated as "wine", they are typically 20% ABV and considered quite distinct from grape wine (葡萄酒) within China.

During the 2nd century BC, Zhang Qian's exploration of the Western Regions (modern Xinjiang) reached the Hellenistic successor states of Alexander's empire: Dayuan, Bactria, and the Indo-Greek Kingdom. These had brought viticulture into Central Asia and trade permitted the first wine produced from V. vinifera grapes to be introduced to China.

Wine was imported again when trade with the west was restored under the Tang dynasty, but it remained mostly imperial fare and it was not until the Song that its consumption spread among the gentry. Marco Polo's 14th-century account noted the continuing preference for rice wines continuing in Yuan China.

=== Ancient Egypt ===
Wine played an important role in ancient Egyptian ceremonial life. A thriving royal winemaking industry was established in the Nile Delta following the introduction of grape cultivation from the Levant to Egypt c. 3000 BC. The industry was most likely the result of trade between Egypt and Canaan during the early Bronze Age, commencing from at least the 27th-century BC Third Dynasty, the beginning of the Old Kingdom period. Winemaking scenes on tomb walls, and the offering lists that accompanied them, included wine that was definitely produced in the delta vineyards. By the end of the Old Kingdom, five distinct wines, probably all produced in the Delta, constituted a canonical set of provisions for the afterlife.

Wine in ancient Egypt was predominantly red. Due to its resemblance to blood, much superstition surrounded wine-drinking in Egyptian culture. Shedeh, the most precious drink in ancient Egypt, is now known to have been a red wine and not fermented from pomegranates as previously thought. Plutarch's Moralia relates that, prior to Psammetichus I, the pharaohs did not drink wine nor offer it to the gods "thinking it to be the blood of those who had once battled against the gods and from whom, when they had fallen and had become commingled with the earth, they believed vines to have sprung". This was considered to be the reason why drunkenness "drives men out of their senses and crazes them, inasmuch as they are then filled with the blood of their forebears".

Residue from five clay amphoras in Tutankhamun's tomb, however, have been shown to be that of white wine, so it was at least available to the Egyptians through trade if not produced domestically.

=== Ancient Phoenicia ===
In ancient times, the Levant region has played a vital role in the domain of winemaking. Archaeological findings, including charred grape seeds and occasionally intact berries or raisins, have been unearthed in numerous prehistoric and historic sites across Southwest Asia. Having deep historical roots dating back to at least the Bronze Age, winemaking in the Levant retained its importance as a significant regional industry until the decline of Byzantine rule in the 7th century CE. This prolonged history of winemaking significantly enriched the cultural and economic tapestry of ancient societies in the region, giving rise to numerous legends and beliefs intertwined with its consumption in the Mediterranean and Near East.

The ancient Phoenicians stood among the early civilizations to acknowledge the significance of cultivating and trading wine. Positioned along the eastern Mediterranean coast, the Phoenicians leveraged their location for far-reaching trade networks across the ancient world. The Phoenician use of amphoras for transporting wine was widely adopted and Phoenician-distributed grape varieties were important in the development of the wine industries of Rome and Greece. The wines of Byblos were exported to Egypt during the Old Kingdom and then throughout the Mediterranean. Evidence for this includes two Phoenician shipwrecks from 750 BCE, found with their cargoes of wine still intact. In 2020, a 2,600-year-old well-preserved Phoenician wine press was excavated at Tell el-Burak, south of Sidon in Lebanon, probably devoted to making wine for trading in their colonies.

The Phoenicians also established colonies along the Mediterranean coasts, from modern-day Tunisia to Spain, where they introduced viticulture practices and grape cultivation. One such colony was Carthage, a city that later developed into a maritime empire. The only Carthaginian recipe to survive the Punic Wars was one by Mago for passum, a raisin wine that later became popular in Rome as well.

=== Ancient Israel ===
Wine held a significant and favored role within ancient Israelite cuisine, serving not only as a dietary staple but also as a crucial element of Israelite cultural and religious practices. In ancient Israel, wine found its place in both everyday use and ceremonial rituals such as sacrificial libations. These traditions became an integral part of Jewish customs and celebrations, upholding the enduring importance of wine within Judaism to this very day. The abundancy of archeological remnants of facilities dedicated to the production of wine (at ancient Gibeon, for example), coupled with detailed depictions of vineyard establishment and grape varieties within the Hebrew Bible, underscore the prominence of wine as the primary alcoholic choice for the ancient Israelites; The word wine appears 142 times in the Bible. Within the Hebrew language, a multitude of terms emerged relating to vines and the various stages of winemaking.

Biblical descriptions reveal that vineyards in ancient Israel were planted either as dedicated plots or interspersed with other fruit trees, located near homes or in more remote agricultural areas. Vines could be allowed to grow along the ground or trained on trellises or poles. The vines were not harvested until their fourth year, in keeping with Levitical law. Harvest typically fell between the grain harvest and the sowing season; Pruning occurred in the fall, and the discarded branches were often used as fuel. Winemaking began with treading grapes by foot in stone winepresses, an act often associated with joy. The juice was then transferred to large clay jars and stored in cool areas such as cellars or ground-floor storage rooms. Winemaking also included the incorporation of spices, honey, herbs, and other ingredients. Jars containing wine were sealed with clay, but a small hole was left open to release gases produced during fermentation. Jewish winemaking evolved during the Hellenistic period, with dried grapes producing sweeter, higher alcohol content wine that required dilution with water for consumption.

Multiple kinds of aromatic wine are mentioned in Talmudic literature (that is, Jewish rabbinic texts from the early centuries AD through late antiquity). Examples include Alontit, which was infused with balsam; Anomalin, a blend of wine, honey, and pepper (comparable to the Greek Oinomelon); and Inmernon, wine spiced with myrrh. Additional examples include Psynthiton, a wine scented with wormwood, and Kafrisin wine, which may derive its name from Cyprus, though it more likely refers to a wine spiced with capers. Raisin wine, smoked wine, and dark wine are also attested in Talmudic literature and ancient inscriptions from Israel.

During Late Antiquity, when the Levant was under Byzantine control, the region established itself as a renowned center for winemaking. Ashkelon and Gaza, two ancient port cities in modern-day Israel and Gaza Strip, rose to prominence as important trade centers, facilitating extensive wine exports throughout the Byzantine Empire. The writings of 4th-century CE priest Jerome vividly depicted the Holy Land's landscape adorned with sprawling vineyards. The wines of this region, as described by the 6th-century CE poet Corippus, stood out for their attributes of being white, light, and sweet.

=== Ancient Greece ===
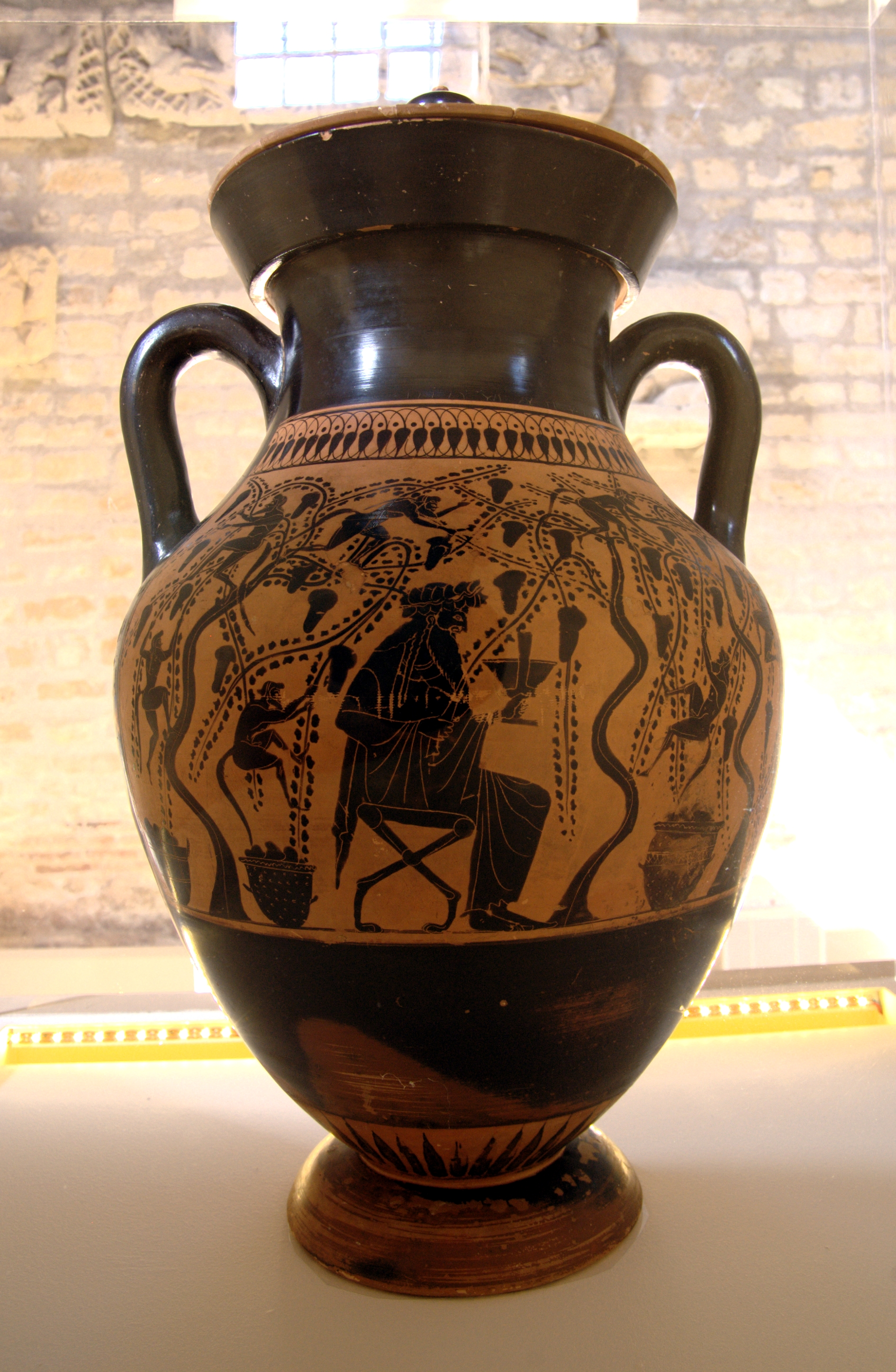
Dionysus in a vineyard, depicted on an amphora from the late 6th century BC.

Much of modern wine culture derives from the practices of the ancient Greeks. The vine preceded both the Minoan and Mycenaean cultures. Many of the grapes grown in modern Greece are grown there exclusively and are similar or identical to the varieties grown in ancient times. Indeed, the most popular modern Greek wine, a strongly aromatic white called retsina, is thought to be a carryover from the ancient practice of lining the wine jugs with tree resin, imparting a distinct flavor to the drink.

The "Feast of the Wine" (Me-tu-wo Ne-wo) was a festival in Mycenaean Greece celebrating the "Month of the New Wine". Several ancient sources, such as the Roman Pliny the Elder, describe the ancient Greek method of using partly dehydrated gypsum before fermentation and some type of lime after, in order to reduce the acidity of the wine. The Greek Theophrastus provides the oldest known description of this aspect of Greek winemaking.

In Homeric mythology, wine is usually served in "mixing bowls" rather than consumed in an undiluted state. Dionysus, the Greek god of revelry and wine—frequently referred to in the works of Homer and Aesop—was sometimes given the epithet Acratophorus, "giver of unmixed wine". Homer frequently refers to the "wine-dark sea" (οἶνωψ πόντος, oīnōps póntos): while having several words for the color blue despite modern claims, the Greeks would simply refer to red wine's color as the sea appeared darker than their perspective of a 'blue' shade.

The earliest reference to a named wine is from the 7th-century BC lyrical poet Alcman, who praises Dénthis, a wine from the western foothills of Mount Taygetus in Messenia, as anthosmías ("flowery-scented"). Chian was credited as the first red wine, although it was known to the Greeks as "black wine". Coan was mixed with sea water and famously salty; Pramnian or Lesbian wine was a famous export as well. Aristotle mentions Lemnian wine, which was probably the same as the modern-day Lemnió varietal, a red wine with a bouquet of oregano and thyme. If so, this makes Lemnió the oldest known varietal still in cultivation.

For Greece, alcohol such as wine had not fully developed into the rich 'cash crop' that it would eventually become toward the peak of its reign. However, as the emphasis of viticulture increased with economic demand so did the consumption of alcohol during the years to come. The Greeks embraced the production aspect as a way to expand and create economic growth throughout the region. Greek wine was widely known and exported throughout the Mediterranean, as amphoras with Greek styling and art have been found throughout the area. The Greeks may have even been involved in the first appearance of wine in ancient Egypt. They introduced the V. vinifera vine to and made wine in their numerous colonies in modern-day Italy, Sicily, southern France, and Spain.

=== Ancient Persia and Arabia ===
Herodotus, writing about the culture of the ancient Persians (in particular, those of Pontus) writes that they were "very fond" of wine and drank it in large quantities.

In the Arabian Peninsula, wine was traded by Aramean merchants, as the climate was not well-suited to the growing of vines. Many other types of fermented drinks, however, were produced in the 5th and 6th centuries, including date and honey wines.

=== Ancient Thrace ===
The works of Homer, Herodotus and other historians of Ancient Greece refer to the ancient Thracians' love for winemaking and consumption, as early as 6000 years ago. the Thracians are considered the first to worship the god of wine called Dionysus in Greek or Zagreus in Thracian. Later this cult reached Ancient Greece. Some consider Thrace (modern day Bulgaria) as the motherland of wine culture.

=== Roman Empire ===
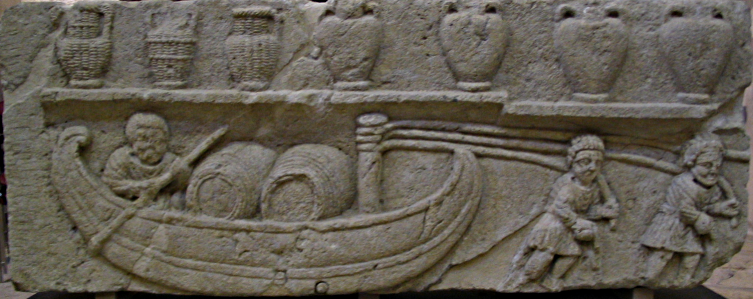
Shipping wine in Roman Gaul: amphoras (top) were the traditional Mediterranean vessels, but the Gauls introduced the use of barrels.

The Roman Empire had an immense impact on the development of viticulture and oenology. Wine was an integral part of the Roman diet and winemaking became a precise business. Virtually all of the major wine-producing regions of Western Europe today were established during the Roman Imperial era. During the Roman Empire, social norms began to shift as the production of alcohol increased. Further evidence suggests that widespread drunkenness and true alcoholism among the Romans began in the first century BC and reached its height in the first century AD. Viniculture expanded so much that by AD c. 92 the emperor Domitian was forced to pass the first wine laws on record, banning the planting of any new vineyards in Italy and uprooting half of the vineyards in the provinces in order to increase the production of the necessary but less profitable grain. (The measure was widely ignored but remained on the books until its 280 repeal by Probus.)

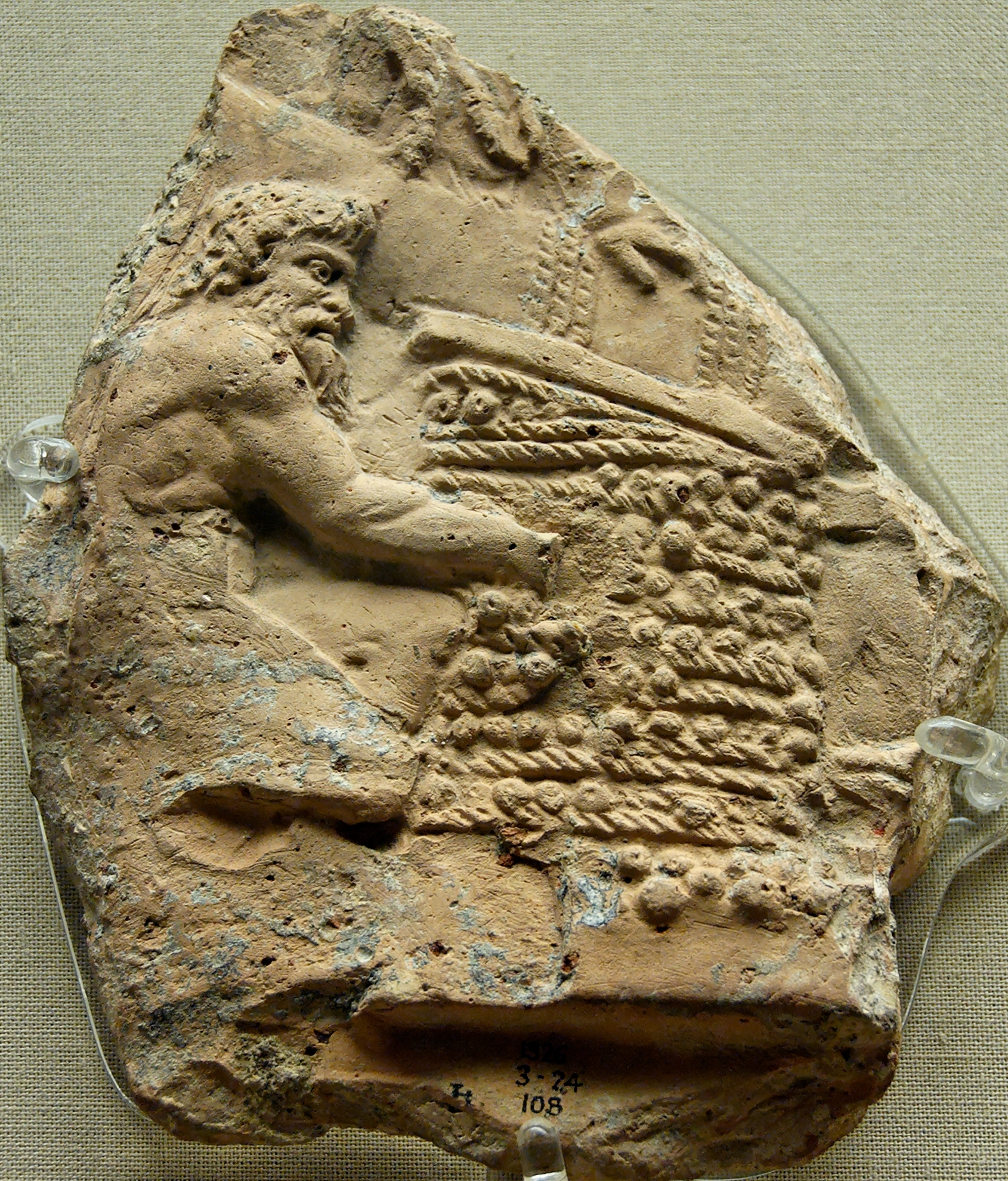
Satyr working at a wine press of wicker-work mats (1st century AD relief).

Winemaking technology and practices improved considerably during the time of the Roman Empire, though technologies from the Bronze Age continued to be used alongside newer innovations. Vitruvius noted how wine storage rooms were specially built facing north, "since that quarter is never subject to change but is always constant and unshifting", and special smokehouses (fumaria) were developed to speed or mimic aging. Many grape varieties and cultivation techniques were developed. Barrels (invented by the Gauls) and glass bottles (invented by the Syrians) began to compete with terracotta amphoras for storing and shipping wine. The Roman statesman Cato the Elder, influenced by the earlier Carthaginian writer Mago, wrote De Agricultura in 160BC, which expounded on Roman viticulture and agriculture. Around 65 AD, the Roman writer Columella produced the most detailed work on Roman viticulture in his twelve-volume text De Re Rustica. Columella's work is one of the earliest to detail trellis systems for raising vines off the ground. Columella advocated the use of stakes versus the previously accepted practice of training vines to grow up along tree trunks. The benefits of using stakes over trees was largely to minimize the dangers associated with climbing trees, which was necessary to prune the dense foliage in order to give the vines sunlight, and later to harvest them.

The Romans also created a precursor to today's appellation systems, as certain regions gained reputations for their fine wines. The most famous was the white Falernian from the Latian–Campanian border, principally because of its high (~15%) alcohol content. The Romans recognized three appellations: Caucinian Falernian from the highest slopes, Faustian Falernian from the center (named for its one-time owner Faustus Cornelius Sulla, son of the dictator), and generic Falernian from the lower slopes and plain. The esteemed vintages grew in value as they aged, and each region produced different varieties as well: dry, sweet, and light. Other famous wines were the sweet Alban from the Alban Hills and the Caecuban beloved by Horace and extirpated by Nero. Pliny cautioned that such 'first-growth' wines not be smoked in a fumarium like lesser vintages. Pliny and others also named Vinum Hadrianum as one of the most rated wines, along with Praetutian from Ancona on the Adriatic, Mamertine from Messina in Sicily, Rhaetic from Verona, and a few others.

Wine, perhaps mixed with herbs and minerals, was assumed to serve medicinal purposes. During Roman times, the upper classes might dissolve pearls in wine for better health. Cleopatra created her own legend by promising Antony she would "drink the value of a province" in one cup of wine, after which she drank an expensive pearl with a cup of the beverage. Pliny relates that, after the ascension of Augustus, Setinum became the imperial wine because it did not cause him indigestion. When the Western Roman Empire fell during the 5th century, Europe entered a period of invasions and social turmoil, with the Roman Catholic Church as the only stable social structure. Through the Church, grape growing and winemaking technology, essential for the Mass, were preserved.

Over the course of the later Empire, wine production gradually shifted to the east as Roman infrastructure and influence in the western regions gradually diminished. Production in Asia Minor, the Aegean and the Near East flourished through Late Antiquity and the Byzantine era.

The oldest surviving urn of wine in liquid state was found in 2019 in a Roman mausoleum in Carmona, southern Spain, and is about 2000 years old. The second oldest surviving bottle still containing liquid wine is the Speyer wine bottle, that belonged to a Roman nobleman and it is dated at 325 or 350 AD.

== Medieval period ==
=== Medieval Middle East ===
The advent of Islam and subsequent Muslim conquests in the 7th and 8th centuries brought many territories under Muslim control. Alcoholic drinks were prohibited by law, but the production of alcohol, wine in particular, seems to have thrived. Wine was a subject for many poets, even under Islamic rule, and many khalifas used to drink alcoholic beverages during their social and private meetings. Jews in Egypt leased vineyards from the Fatimid and Mamluk governments, produced wine for sacramental and medicinal use, and traded wine throughout the Eastern Mediterranean.

Christian monasteries in the Levant and Iraq often cultivated grapevines; they then distributed their vintages in taverns located on monastery grounds. Zoroastrians in Persia and Central Asia also engaged in the production of wine. Though not much is known about their wine trade, they did become known for their taverns. Wine in general found an industrial use in the medieval Middle East as feedstock after advances in distillation by Muslim alchemists allowed for the production of relatively pure ethanol, which was used in the perfume industry. Wine was also for the first time distilled into brandy during this period.

In the Levant, the Muslim conquest of the Levant suppressed winemaking after centuries of regional prominence, and the 13th-century Mamluk conquest resulted in its complete prohibition.

=== Medieval Europe ===
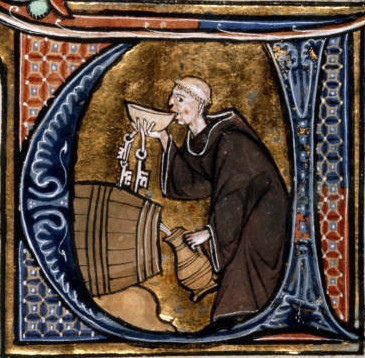
Monastic cellarer tasting wine as depicted in Li Livres dou Santé, a late 13th century French manuscript.

Since wine was necessary for the celebration of the Catholic Mass, assuring a supply was crucial. The Benedictine monks became one of the largest producers of wine in Italy and France, as did the Cistercians, after their founding in 1098, who planted vineyards across Europe, including Clos de Vougeot and Steinberg. Other orders, such as the Carthusians, the Templars, and the Carmelites, are also notable both historically and in modern times as wine producers. In 1435 Count John IV of Katzenelnbogen, a wealthy member of the high nobility of the Holy Roman Empire from near Frankfurt, was the first to plant Riesling, the most important German grape. The nearby winemaking monks made it into an industry, producing enough wine to ship all over Europe for secular use.

Bordeaux was the only important wine region without close connections to the Church. Due to the political ties between the Duchy of Aquitaine and England between 1152 and 1453, its output was dedicated to meeting the demands of the British market. This trade was overseen by the Worshipful Company of Vintners after its establishment in 1363.

In northern Europe the weather and climate posed difficulties for grape cultivation, so certain species were selected that better suited the environment. Until the 13th century most vineyards grew white varieties of grape, which are more resistant to the damp and cold climates. By the end of the 14th century, however, some red grape varieties had been introduced, such as Pinot Noir and Gamay in Burgundy.

During this period wine was the common drink of all social classes in the south of Europe, where grapes were cultivated. In the north and east, where fewer grapes were grown, beer was the usual beverage of most of the population. Wine was exported to the northern regions, but because of its relatively high expense and scarcity it was seldom consumed by the lower classes. A housewife of the merchant class or a servant in a noble household would have served wine at every meal, and had a selection of reds and whites alike. Home recipes for meads from this period are still in existence, along with recipes for spicing and masking flavors in wines, including the simple act of adding a small amount of honey. As wines were kept in barrels, they were not extensively aged, and thus drunk quite young.

The publication of Liber de Vinis by Arnaldus de Villa Nova in the 13th century established the use of wine in medicine: "he saw it as being particularly useful as an antiseptic, a restorative, and for the preparation of poultices". Another application of wine at the time was the use of snake-stones (banded agate resembling the figural rings on a snake) dissolved in wine as a remedy for snake bites, which shows an early understanding of the effects of alcohol on the central nervous system in such situations.

== Modern era ==
=== Spread and development in the Americas ===
Following the voyages of Columbus, grape culture and wine making were transported from the Old World to the New. European grape varieties were first brought to what is now Mexico by the first Spanish conquistadors to provide the necessities of the Catholic Holy Eucharist. Planted at Spanish missions, one variety came to be known as the Mission grape and is still planted today in small amounts. Spanish missionaries also took viticulture to Chile and Argentina in the mid-16th century and to Baja California in the 18th. Succeeding waves of immigrants, particularly in the 19th and early 20th centuries, imported French, Italian and German V. vinifera grapes, although wine from those native to the Americas (whose flavors can be distinctly different) is also produced. Mexico became the most important wine producer starting in the 16th century, to the extent that its output began to affect Spanish commercial production. In this competitive climate, the Spanish king sent an executive order to halt Mexico's production of wines and the planting of vineyards.

During the devastating phylloxera blight in late 19th-century Europe, it was found that Native American vines were immune to the pest. French-American hybrid grapes were developed and saw some use in Europe, but more important was the practice of grafting European grapevines to American rootstocks to protect vineyards from the insect. The practice continues to this day wherever phylloxera is present.

The prime wine-growing regions of South America were established in the foothills of the Andes Mountains in Argentina and Chile. In California, the centre of viticulture shifted from the southern missions to the Central Valley and the northern counties of Sonoma, Napa, and Mendocino. Today, wine in the Americas is still often associated with these regions, all of which produce a wide variety of wines, from inexpensive jug wines to high-quality varietals and proprietary blends. Most of the wine production in the Americas is based on Old World grape varieties, and wine-growing regions there have often "adopted" grapes that have become particularly closely identified with them. California's Zinfandel (from Croatia and Southern Italy), Argentina's Malbec, and Chile's Carmenère (both from France) are well-known examples.

Until the latter half of the 20th century, American wine was generally viewed as inferior to that of Europe. However, with the surprisingly favorable American showing at the Paris Wine tasting of 1976, New World wine began to garner respect in the land of wine's origins.

=== Developments in Europe ===
In the late 19th century, the phylloxera louse brought widespread destruction to grapevines, wine production, and those whose livelihoods depended on them; far-reaching repercussions included the loss of many indigenous varieties. Lessons learned from the infestation led to the positive transformation of Europe's wine industry. Bad vineyards were uprooted and their land turned to better uses. Some of France's best butter and cheese, for example, is now made from cows that graze on Charentais soil, which was previously covered with vines. Cuvées were also standardized, important in creating certain wines as they are known today; Champagne and Bordeaux finally achieved the grape mixes that now define them. In the Balkans, where phylloxera had had little impact, the local varieties survived. However, the uneven transition from Ottoman rule has meant only gradual transformation in many vineyards. It is only in recent times that local varieties have gained recognition beyond "mass-market" wines like retsina.

=== Australia, New Zealand and South Africa ===
In the context of wine, Australia, New Zealand, South Africa and other countries without a wine tradition are considered New World producers. Wine production began in the Cape Province of what is now South Africa in the 1680s as a business for supplying ships. Australia's First Fleet (1788) brought cuttings of vines from South Africa, although initial plantings failed and the first successful vineyards were established in the early 19th century. Until quite late in the 20th century, the product of these countries was not well known outside their small export markets. For example, Australia exported mainly to the United Kingdom; New Zealand retained most of its wine for domestic consumption, and South Africa exported to the Kings of Europe. However, with the increase in mechanization and scientific advances in winemaking, these countries became known for high-quality wine. A notable exception to the foregoing is that the Cape Province was the largest exporter of wine to Europe in the 18th century.

=== East Asia ===
In East Asia, the first modern wine industry was Japanese wine, developed in 1874 after grapevines were brought back from Europe. The earliest wine producing companies in Japan are Mercian (established in 1877) and Suntory (established in 1909).

== See also ==
- History of Champagne
- History of Chianti
- History of French wine
- History of Portuguese wine
- History of Sherry
- History of Rioja wine
- History of the wine press
- Phoenicians and wine
- Lebanese wine
- Wine in China
- Indian wine
- Speyer wine bottle
- Wine warehouses of Bercy

== Sources ==
- Johnson, Hugh (1992). Vintage: The Story of Wine. Simon and Schuster. OL 7665276M.
- Phillips, Rod (2000). A Short History of Wine. New York: Ecco. pp. 62–63. OL 3943121M.
- Robinson, Jancis, ed. (2006). The Oxford Companion to Wine (3rd ed.). Oxford: Oxford University Press. ISBN 978-0-19-860990-2. OL 7401546M.
