= Phoenicians and wine =

Relationship between Phoenician culture and wine

Through their extensive maritime trade network, the Phoenicians played a significant role in spreading viticulture and winemaking throughout the Mediterranean basin.

The culture of the ancient Phoenicians was one of the first to have had a significant effect on the history of wine. Phoenicia was a civilization centered in current day Lebanon. Between 1550 BC and 300 BC, the Phoenicians developed a maritime trading culture that expanded their influence from the Levant to North Africa, the Greek Isles, Sicily, and the Iberian Peninsula. Through contact and trade, they spread not only their alphabet but also their knowledge of viticulture and winemaking, including the propagation of several ancestral varieties of the Vitis vinifera species of wine grapes.

They either introduced or encouraged the dissemination of wine knowledge to several regions that today continue to produce wine suitable for international consumption. These include modern-day Lebanon, Syria, Algeria, Tunisia, Egypt, Greece, Italy, Spain, France, and Portugal.

The Phoenicians and their Punic descendants of Carthage had a direct influence on the growing winemaking cultures of the ancient Greeks and Romans that would later spread viticulture across Europe. The agricultural treatises of the Carthaginian writer Mago were among the most important early texts in the history of wine to record ancient knowledge of winemaking and viticulture. While no original copies of Mago's or other Phoenician wine writers' works have survived, there is evidence from quotations of Greek and Roman writers such as Columella that the Phoenicians were skilled winemakers and viticulturists.

They were capable of planning vineyards according to favorable climate and topography, such as which side of a slope was most ideal for grape growing, and producing a wide variety of different wine styles ranging from straw wines made from dried grapes to an early example of the modern Greek wine retsina, made with pine resin as an ingredient. The Phoenicians also spread the use of amphorae (often known as the "Canaanite jar") for the transport and storage of wine.

== Early history in wine trading ==
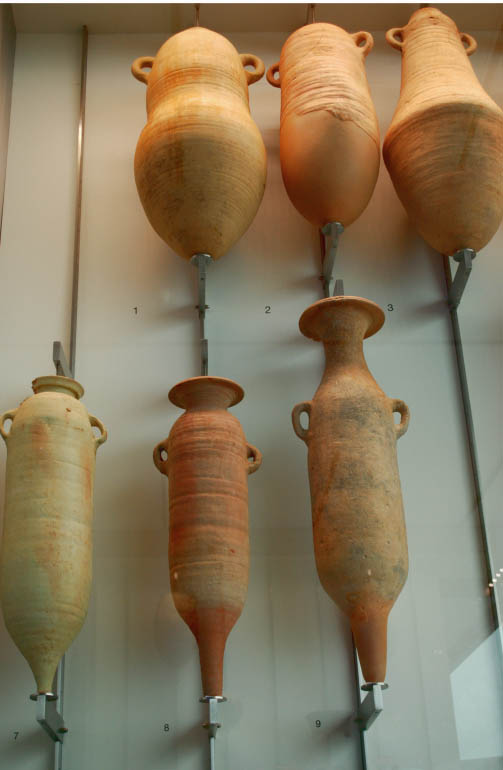
The Phoenicians transported wine across the Mediterranean in amphorae, vessels once also known as the "Canaanite jar."

Historians think it was shortly after the discovery of wine, the alcoholic product of fermented grape juice, that cultures realized its value as a trade commodity. Although wild grapes of the genus Vitis could be found throughout the known world and all could be fermented, it took some degree of knowledge and skill to turn these grapes into palatable wine. This knowledge was passed along the trading routes that emerged from the Caucasus and Zagros Mountains down through Mesopotamia and to the Mediterranean, eventually reaching Phoenicia. Specific varieties of grapevines of the V. vinifera species were identified as especially favorable for winemaking, cuttings of which were spread via these trade routes.

In addition to being a valuable trade commodity for personal consumption, wine also began to take on religious and cultural significance. Wine, or chemer as the Phoenicians called it, was associated with various Levantine deities—most notably El. Wine was considered an acceptable offering to both gods and kings, increasing its trade value in the ancient world. Around 1000 BC, the Mediterranean wine trade exploded, making the Phoenicians and their extensive maritime trade network prime beneficiaries of the increased demand. The Phoenicians not only traded in wine produced in Canaan but also developed markets for wine produced in colonies and port cities around the Mediterranean Sea.

== Expansion and colonization ==
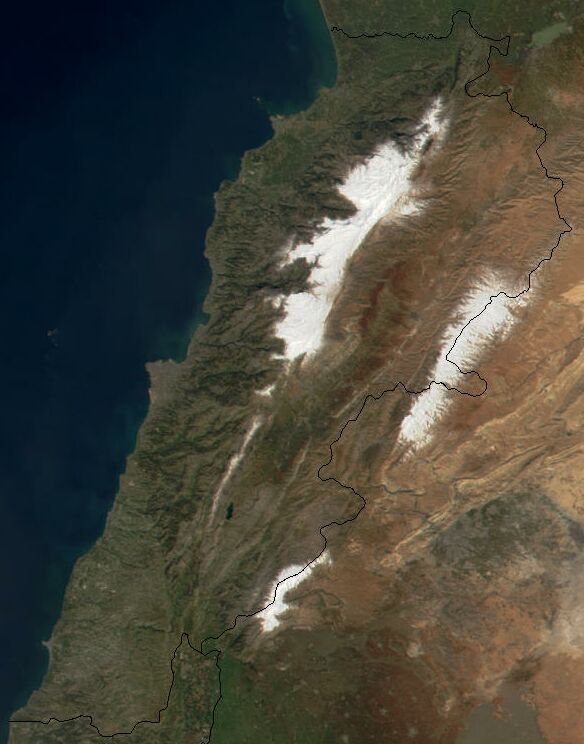
Lebanon Map: Vitis vinifera evidence from ancient Rome shows wine was cultivated and then domesticated in Lebanon, at least two thousand years before Alexander the Great

From their principal settlements in cities like Byblos, Tyre and Sidon, the Phoenicians began to expand their trade influence to their neighbors and among the first to bring wine to Egypt. From there they expanded from beyond mere trading to establishing colonies of trading cities throughout the Mediterranean. They continued along the southern shores to found Carthage in 814 BC in northern Africa, and from there to the Balearic Islands and the Iberian Peninsula. The Phoenicians were the founders of Málaga and Cádiz in present-day Spain sometime in the 9th century, though a small outpost may have been established even earlier.

The Phoenicians traveled the peninsula's interior, establishing trading routes along the Tagus, Douro, Baetis (Guadalquivir) and Iberus (Ebro) rivers. While it is clear that the Phoenician colonies along the coast had planted vineyards, and the Phoenicians likely traded wine with the tribes along the rivers inland, it is not yet certain how far they took winemaking inland. In Portugal, however, the Phoenicians were known to trade amphorae of wine for local silver and tin.

A recent discovery in the modern-day winemaking region of Valdepeñas in the south central part of what is now Spain, suggests that the Phoenicians brought viticulture further inland. Excavation in Valdepeñas has revealed the remnants of the ancient Iberian town of Cerro de las Cabezas, founded sometime in the 7th century BC. Among the remnants were several examples of Phoenician ceramics, pottery and artifacts, including winemaking equipment.

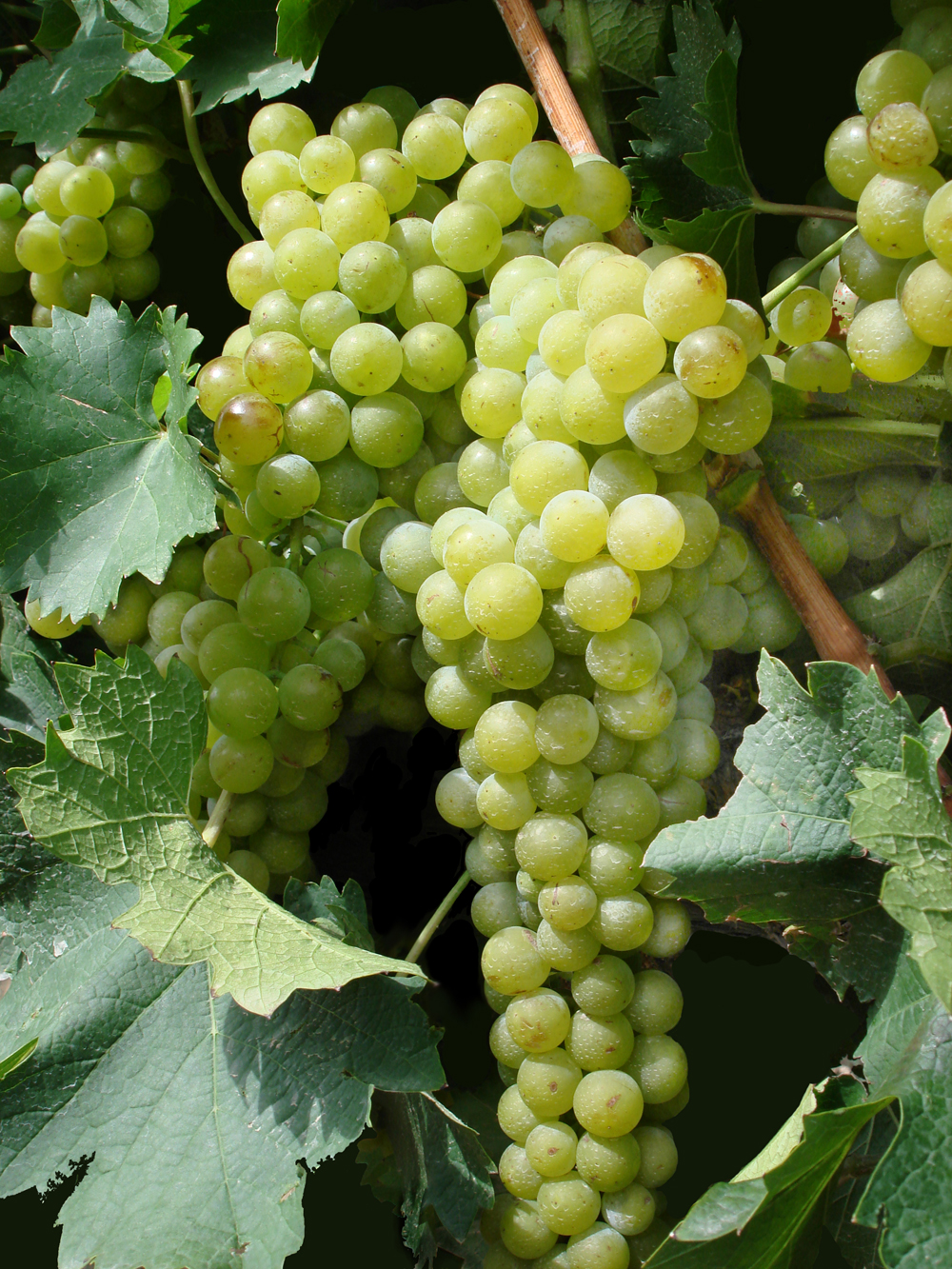
Ampelographers theorize that the Vitis vinifera pontica vine spread by the Phoenicians across the Mediterranean was an ancestor vine to many of the world's most widely planted white grape varieties.

Beyond the Phoenicians' own expansion and colonization, the civilization did much to influence the Greek and Roman civilizations to pursue their own campaigns of expansion. Dealing directly with the Greeks, the Phoenicians taught them not only their knowledge of winemaking and viticulture but also shipbuilding technologies that encouraged the Greeks to expand beyond the Aegean Sea. The wines of Phoenicia had such an enduring presence in the Greek and Roman world that the adjective "Bybline" (from the Phoenician town of Byblos) became a byword denoting wine of high quality.

=== Spread of grapevines ===
The most enduring legacy of Phoenicia's era of expansion was the propagation and spread of ancestral grapevines that ampelographers believe eventually gave rise to several modern grape varieties in Europe. One subvariety, known to ampelographers and wine historians as V. vinifera pontica, was brought to Phoenicia from the Caucasus and Anatolia regions. The Phoenicians spread this strain throughout the Mediterranean—most notably to its Iberian colonies. Ampelographers theorize that this vine is the ancestor of many of today's most widely planted white grapes. According to research from the University of California-Davis, the French wine grape Mourvèdre may have been first introduced by the Phoenicians to Barcelona, in the modern-day Spanish wine region of Catalonia, around 500 BC.

=== Carthage ===
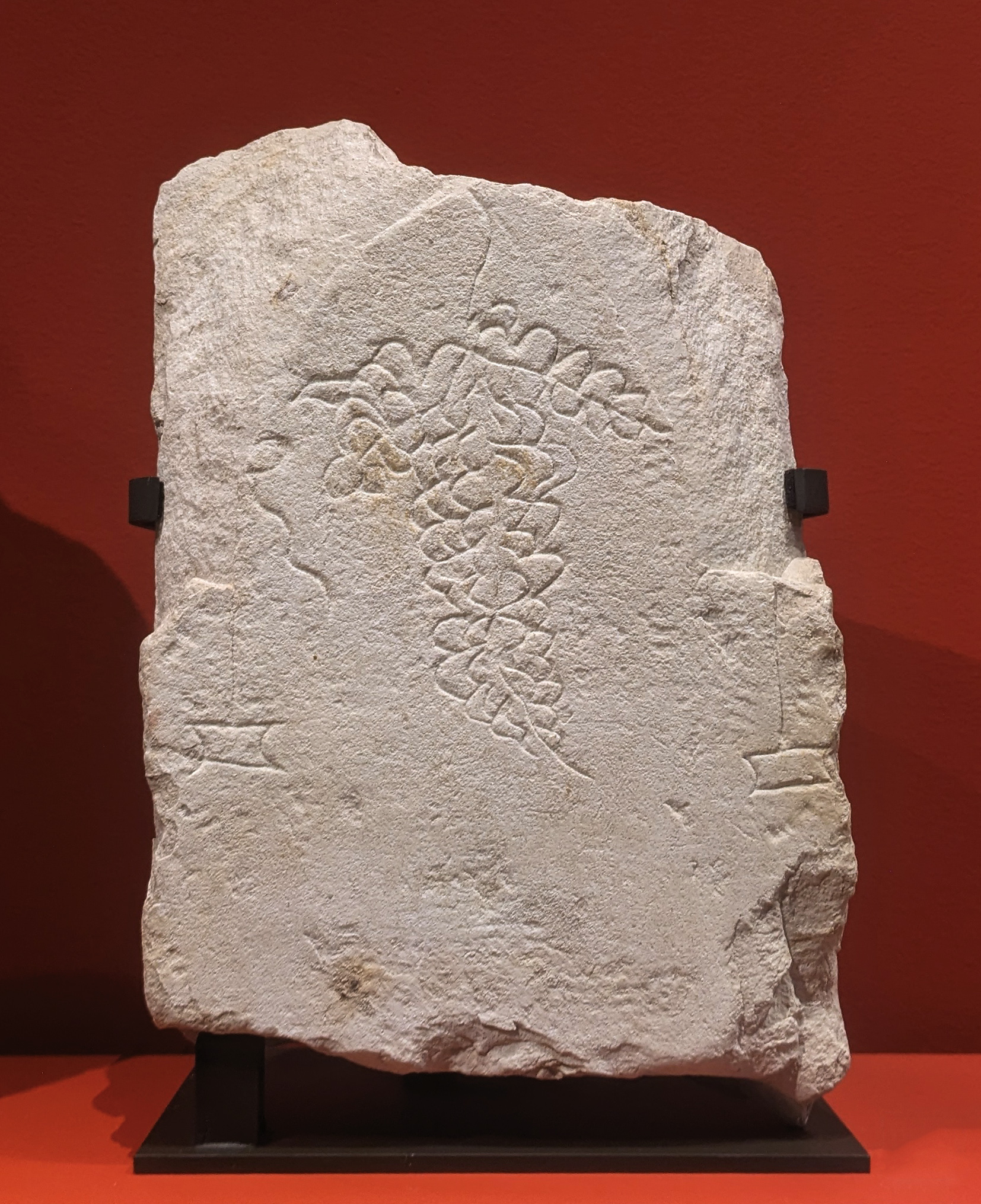
A Punic stele from Carthage, with a carving of grapevines

Carthage, in modern-day Tunisia, was the Phoenicians' most successful colony and survived in its Punic form until its destruction in 146 BC by Roman forces at the end of the Punic Wars. The colony shared an indelible association with wine and was described in the 4th century as having countrysides full of grapevines and olives. Carthaginian wine produced from the Bagradas river valley was particularly popular.

The city of Carthage also served as a center of knowledge, exemplified by the work of the Punic writer Mago, who consolidated the agricultural and viticultural knowledge of the 3rd- and 2nd-century BC Mediterranean world into a 28-volume set. His writings detailed advanced knowledge of the influence of topography on vineyard production, with recommendations, for example, that the north slope of a hill be planted to shield grapevines from the excessively hot North African sun. The work also discussed winemaking practices, including early examples of "raisin wine" made from dried grapes. Carthage's rival, Rome, indicated the significance of Mago's treatise when the Roman Senate issued a decree requesting its translation into Latin. It was among the few works saved from the Carthaginian library when the Romans destroyed the city in 146 BC.

Today there are no surviving remnants of Mago's work or its Latin translation. What is known is documented through quotations of his books by Greek and Roman authors, most notably the Roman Columella.

== Archeological finds ==
=== Tell el-Burak ===
In September 2020, a team of Lebanese and German archaeologists uncovered a Phoenician settlement and a remarkably well preserved plastered wine press in Tell el-Burak, 9 kilometres (5.6 mi) South of Sidon in Lebanon. The press is the oldest wine such installation uncovered in mainland Phoenicia and is one of the finest examples of ancient Mediterranean wine presses. Before the discovery, archaeological evidence of winemaking in mainland Phoenicia had been scarce due to the lack of systematic archaeological surveys of the Lebanese coastline. The tell site was mapped in 2002 using a magnetometry survey; this came one year after the launch of the excavations by the Tell el-Burak Archaeological Project. The excavated area revealed a large Bronze Age palace, Late Bronze Age structures, and various Iron Age buildings, including three plastered structures and the winepress. Among the finds were a large number of transport amphorae and a paleobotanical assemblage consisting mostly of Vitis vinifera seeds.

=== Marsala shipwreck ===
The Marsala Ship is the earliest warship known from archeological evidence. It is a wreck discovered in 1971 in an area called Punta Scario in the harbor of Marsala in western Sicily, Italy, near the Aegadian Islands. The Marsala Ship's "nationality" was painted on the sides with letters by its Punic builders from Carthage. The warship carried small cups and bowls for individual servings and wine amphorae of miscellaneous shapes. The remains of marijuana stems — which may have been chewed by the oarsmen — were also found in the wreck.

=== Tanit and Elissa shipwrecks ===
Beginning in 1997, a U.S. Naval research submarine, American submarine NR-1, at a depth of 1,200 feet, gained grainy video of what appeared to be two outlines of ships. After seeing this video, Robert Ballard, the founder of the Titanic, used similar techniques along with years of expertise to lead an expedition to what he believed to be Phoenician ships carrying wine. Lawrence Stager, a Harvard University archaeologist, joined the expedition in 1999 thirty miles off the shore of Israel. Larry was hesitant at first due to the possibility of them being Byzantine, which is not worth the trouble, instead of the coveted Iron Age Phoenician ships that are not well studied. Working together, their gamble paid off when they realized the importance of their finds.

The Tanit and the Elissa ships were both found upright and in great condition for research thanks to the presence of cold water at that depth and the absence of sediment. These shipwrecks are the most ancient discovered in the deep sea, marking the first Iron Age vessels uncovered in the Mediterranean and the earliest Phoenician ships located globally. Ballard devised a meticulous strategy aimed at surveying, planning, and photographing the two most ancient shipwrecks. His paramount objective was to gather essential details-including size, age, cargo type, home port, intended route, destination, cause of shipwreck, and the cargo's economic significance within Mediterranean networks- while disturbing sites as minimally as possible.

==== Cargo ====
An important part in completing his objective would be to examine the cargo that can be found inside the ships, particularly the plethora of Amphoras. The ships contained a total of 781 amphoras: the Tanit contained 385 visible amphoras and Elissa contained 396. Many were found still intact, but missing the wine inside and filled with different sediments. These amphoras date back to the middle to end of the eighth century, consistent with Phoenician settlement.

One particular amphora that is important for wine is the "torpedo" shaped ones which were lined with resin and pine pitch. Dr. Patrick McGovern of the Molecular Archeology Laboratory at the University of Pennsylvania Museum used different techniques to find the presence of tartaric acid on the ships. Tartaric acid is an acid found in wine due to its presence of grapes. His analysis solidified the theory that these ships were used to ship wine in large quantities through the Mediterranean.

Another amphora found that is important in understanding the relationship between Phoenicians and wine is the Mushroom-Lipped Decanter. Inscriptions found on the side of these indicate both its usage and its contents. The mushroom-style rim is seen in many Phoenician amphorae and is vital in determining the origins of the ships crew. Ballard believes that the cause of the wreck is a bad storm that caused these ships to be left where they have been found. The ships could have either been headed to Carthage or Egypt, routes that have not previously been known.

== See also ==
- Lebanese Wine
- Ancient Greece and wine
- Ancient Rome and wine
- History of the wine press
- History of merchants
