= Vinum Hadrianum =

Wine from Atri

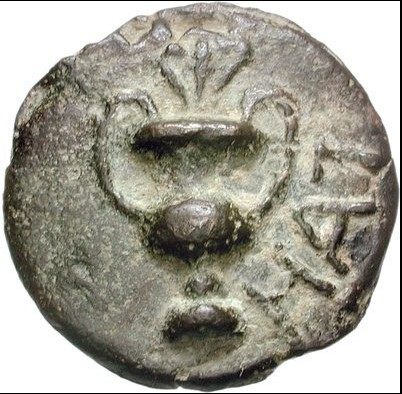
A coin that shows Kantharos, a type of ancient Greek cup used for drinking. A coin in a quadruncia (aes grave).

Vinum Hadrianum (Greek: Adriakos, Adrianos) is a wine from Hadria or Hatria, currently known as Atri, in Picenum on the Adriatic coast of central Italy. Hadrianum was already ancient in fame and was known as one of the good wines of the Empire.

== History ==
Hadrianum achieved a good reputation in the 1st century AD. Pliny rated Hadrianum as one of the good wines, along with Mamertine from Messina in Sicily, Praetutian from Ancona on the Adriatic, Rhaetic from Verona, Luna from Tuscany, and Genoa from Liguria.

Hadrianum was also praised by two Greek Augustan poets, Antiphilos of Byzantium and Antipater of Thessaloniki. In the middle of the 1st century AD, Dioscorides mentioned Hadrianum as a neighboring wine of the so-called Praetutianum. In Diocletian's Edict on maximum prices, it was mentioned that a Picenum wine, where Hadrianum was produced, was considered the most expensive wine, followed by the wine from Tibur and Falernum.

Augustus also mentioned that a good vintage wine produced in Hatria was called Hadrianum, while Emperor Hadrian introduced Vinum Hadrianum as a medicated wine.

== The amphorae ==
The region of Atri was known for its production of amphorae. Wine in Atri was produced in amphorae, which were praised by the Egyptians, Greeks, and Romans. In the middle of the 2nd century BC, a discovery was made and found broken amphorae, which had lids in the form of a small disc with a diameter of 10 cm and a small knob in the center with archaic letters written around it that read Hatria. Some of these amphorae had writings that read as Hatria(num). These amphorae contained the Vinum Hadrianum.

== See also ==
- Ancient Rome and wine
- History of wine
