= History of the wine press =

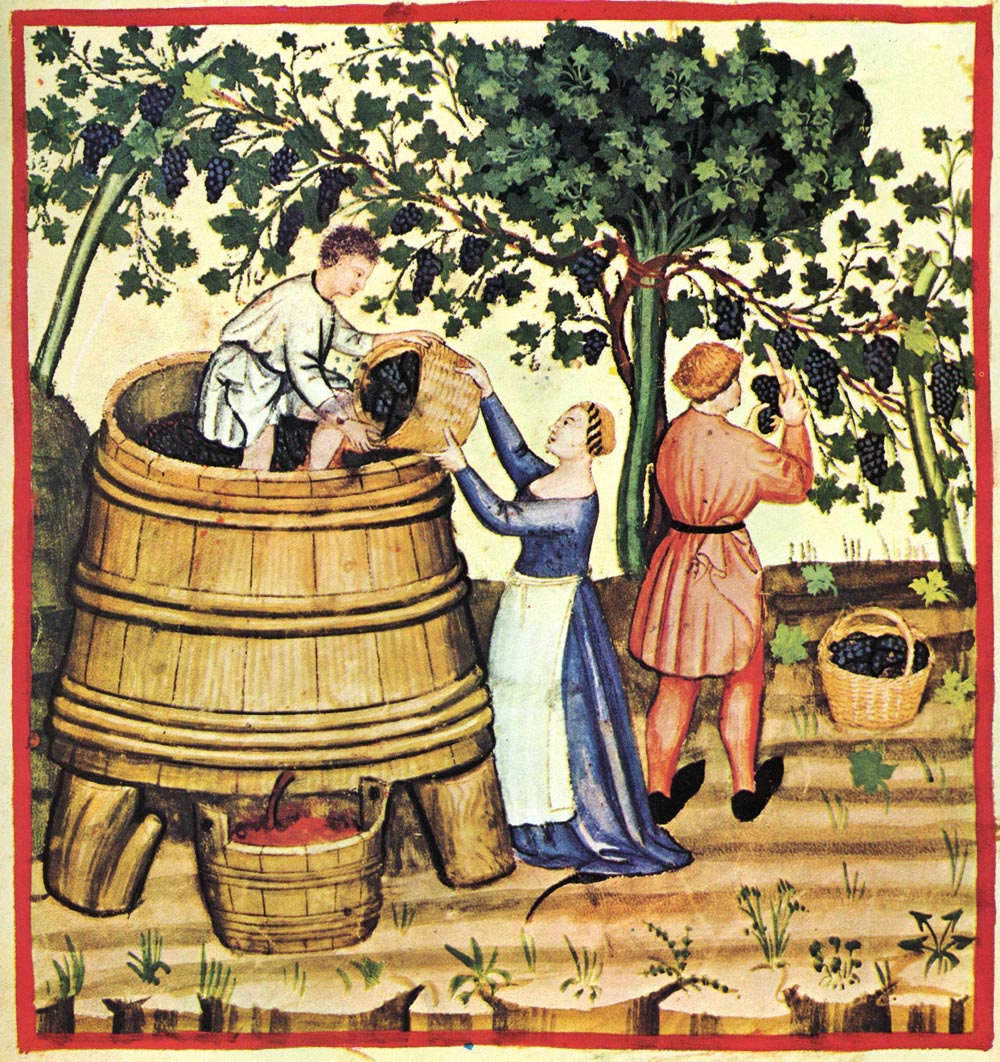
The first wine press was probably the human foot and the use of manual treading of grapes is a tradition that has lasted for thousands of years and is still used in some wine regions today.

The history of the wine press and of pressing is nearly as old as the history of wine itself with the remains of wine presses providing some of the longest-serving evidence of organised viticulture and winemaking in the ancient world. The earliest wine press was probably the human foot or hand, crushing and squeezing grapes into a bag or container where the contents would ferment.

The pressure applied by these manual means was limited and these early wines were probably pale in colour and body, and eventually ancient winemakers sought out alternative means of pressing their wine. By at least the 18th dynasty, the ancient Egyptians were employing a "sack press" made of cloth that was squeezed with the aid of a giant tourniquet. The use of a wine press in winemaking is mentioned frequently in the Bible but these presses were more elaboration of treading lagars where grapes that were tread by feet with the juice running off into special basins.

The more modern idea of a piece of a winemaking equipment used to extract the juice from the skins probably emerged during the Greco-Roman periods from which written accounts by Cato the Elder, Marcus Terentius Varro, Pliny the Elder and others described wooden wine presses that utilized large beams, capstans and windlasses to exert pressure on the pomace. The wines produced by these presses were usually darker, with more color extracted from the skins but could also be more harsh with bitter tannins also extracted. That style of wine press would eventually evolve into the basket press used in the Middle Ages by wine estates of the nobility and Catholic Church leading to the modern tank batch and continuous presses used in wineries today.

== Early history ==
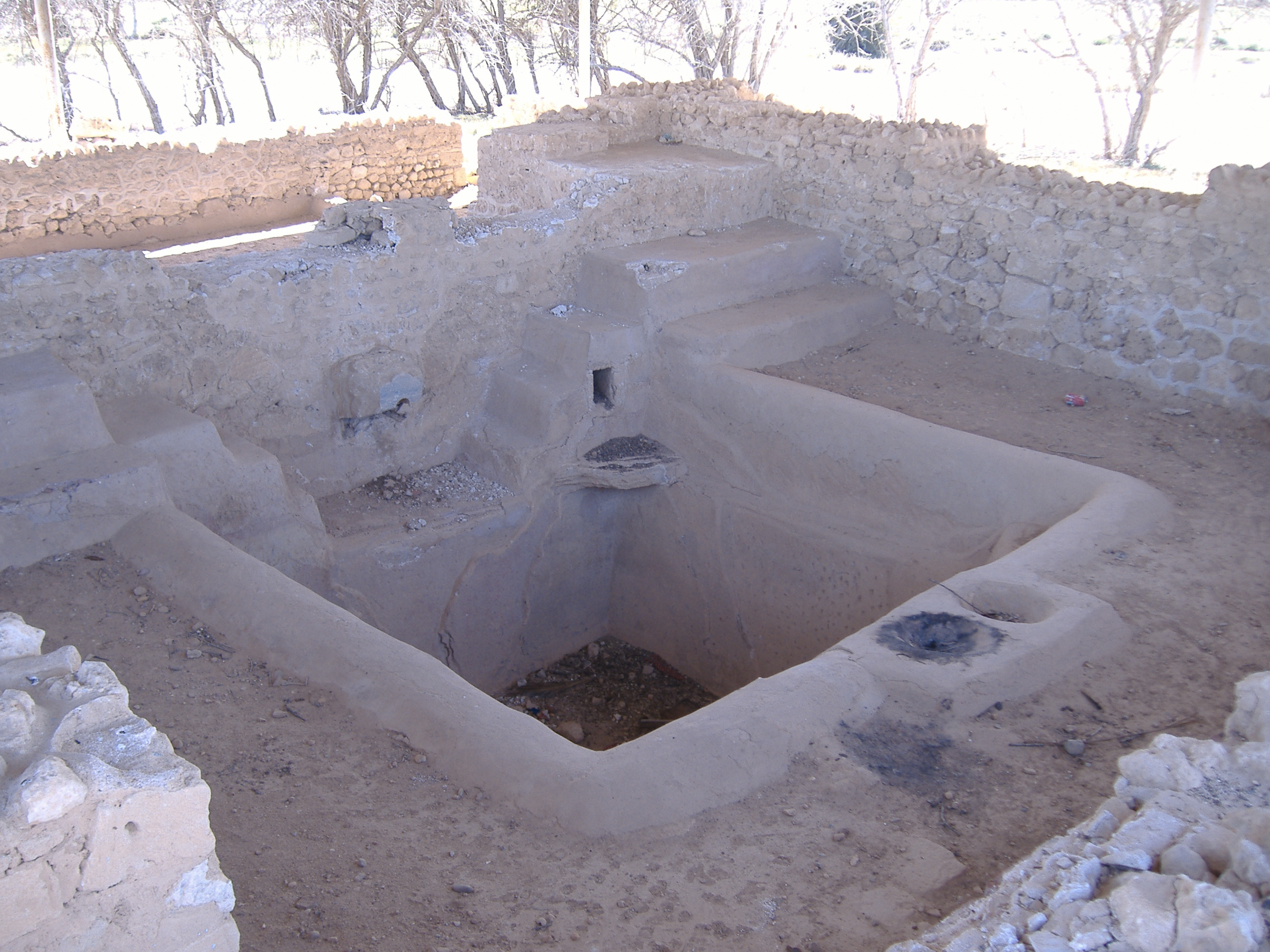
Ancient Egyptian pressing basin, in which grapes were probably trodden by human feet in the Marea region around present-day Lake Mariout

The exact origins of winemaking (and, thus, of pressing grapes) are not known, but most archaeologists believe that it originated somewhere in the Transcaucasia between the Black and Caspian Seas in the land that now includes the modern countries of Russia, Georgia, Armenia, Azerbaijan, Turkey and Iran. There are stories in the Imeretin Valley (in what is now Krasnodar Krai, Russia) dating to between 7000 and 5000 BC of early winemaking using hollowed-out logs that they would fill with grapes, tread with their feet and then scoop the juice and crushed grape remains into jars to ferment. In the 17th century, French traveller Sir Jean Chardin described a similar practice still in use thousands of years later in Georgia.

The earliest evidence of deliberate winemaking is from excavation at sites like Areni-1 winery in what is now the Vayots Dzor Province of Armenia. This site, dating back to around 4000 BC included a trough that measured about 3 by 3 1/2 feet and included a drain that went into a 2-foot-long vat that could contain about 14–15 gallons (52–57 liters) of wine. The carbon dating of these sites (and earlier sites at Çatalhöyük and Neolithic B sites in Jordan) are based on left over grape pips (seeds) and while they provide solid evidence of wine making, they do not necessarily provide evidence of how the wine was made and if the modern concept of pressing (i.e. extracting juice from the skins and separating it from the skins and seeds) was used.

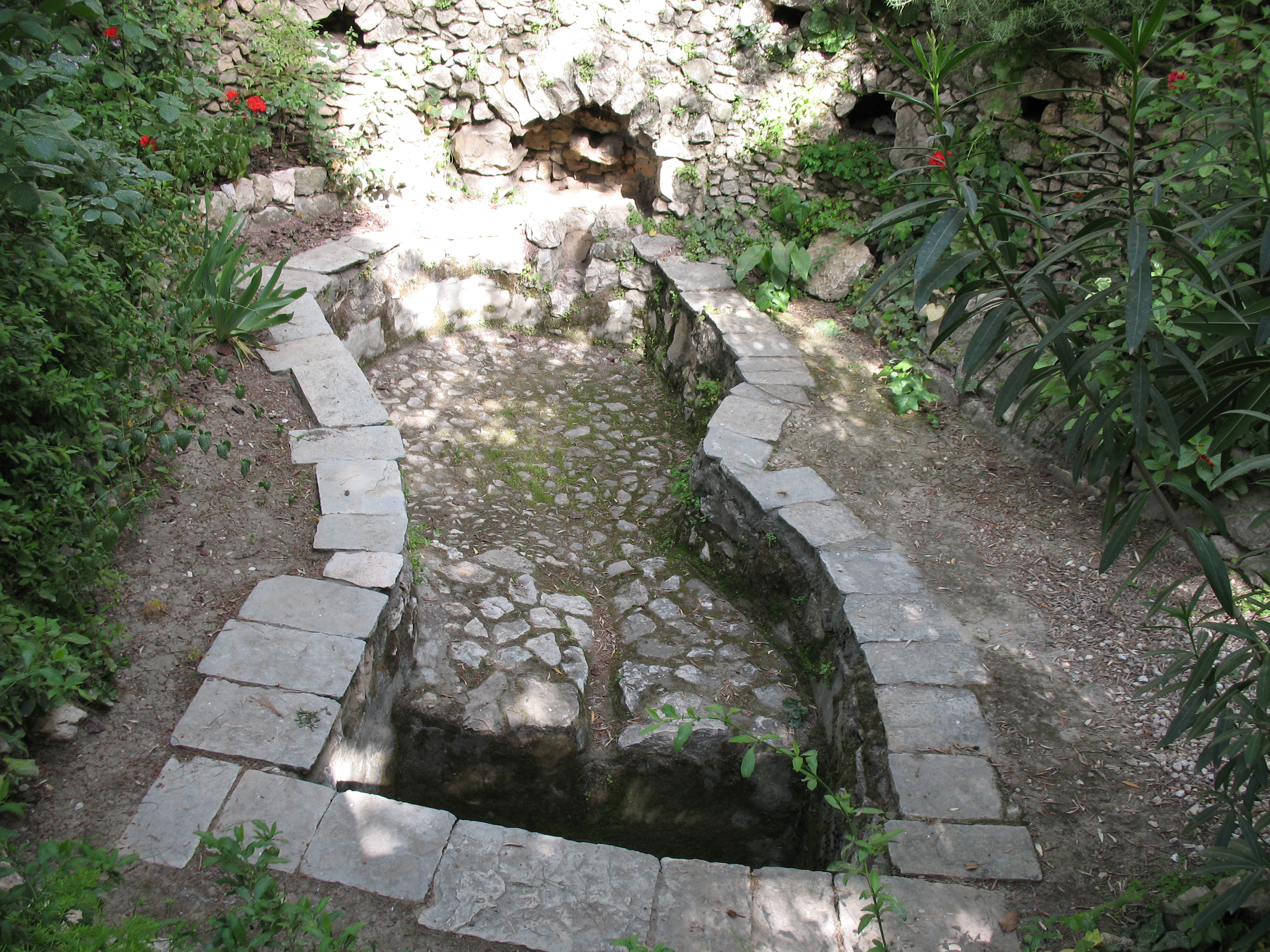
A 1st century AD wine pressing trough from the Old City of Jerusalem

Winemaking in ancient Egypt probably used people's feet for crushing and pressing the grapes, but tomb paintings excavated at Thebes showed that the ancient Egyptians developed some innovations to their wine presses-such as the use of long bars hanging over the treading basins and straps that the workers could hold onto while treading. Hieroglyph and paintings also showed the Egyptians by at least by the 18th Dynasty (c. 1550 – c. 1292 BC) were also using a type of cloth "sack press" in which grapes or skins left over from treading would be twisted and squeezed by a tourniquet to release the juice. A modified version of this sack press had the sack hung between two large poles with workers holding each pole. After the grapes were loaded into the sack, the workers would walk in opposite directions, squeezing the grapes in the bag and capturing the juice in a vat underneath the bag. This early wine press not only had the benefit of exerting more pressure on the skins and extracting more juice than treading but the cloth also acted an early form of filtering the wine.

== Ancient Greece and Rome ==
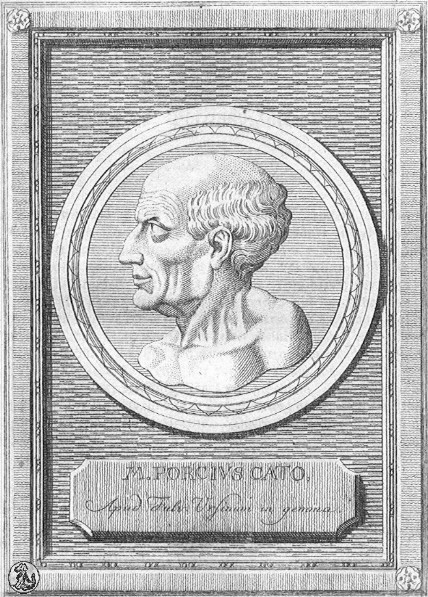
One of the first written accounts of a mechanical wine press was from the 2nd century BC Roman writer Marcus Cato.

One of the earliest known Greek wine presses was discovered in Palekastro in Crete and dated to the Mycenaean period (1600–1100 BC). Like most of the earlier presses, it was mainly a stone basin for treading the grapes by feet with a run-off drain for the juice to flow. However, there is evidence that some of the later Cretan winemakers would sometimes use a pressing method similar to how olive oil was extracted from olives. This press would entail laying the grapes out underneath several planks of wood and then weighing the planks down with rocks to press the juice out from the grapes. The wine made from these rudimentary pressings wasn't held in high esteem by the Greeks, often tainted with impurities and having a short shelf life. Much more prized was the wine produced from "free run" juice that was released by the grapes under their own weight before any treading or pressing. This wine was believed to be the most pure and was often used for medicinal purposes.

In the 2nd century BC, Cato the Elder wrote a vivid and detailed account of the workings of early Roman wine presses and how to build a press room in his work De Agri Cultura. The press Cato describes was known as a lever or beam press which was built on an elevated platform that contained a shallow basin that would slope and narrow to a run off point where the freed juice would exit. The press would consist of a large horizontal beam held up by two upright fixtures in the front and one upright fixture in the front. The grapes were placed under the beam with pressure was applied by a windlass that was affixed by rope to the front of the beam and a user winding down that end. Rope would also be used wound around the "cake" of the pressed grape skins to help keep it in place.

In the 1st century AD, Roman statesman Pliny the Elder described a "Greek style" press in his work Natural History that saw the windlass replaced by a vertical screw that often included a counterweight to increase pressure. Marcus Terentius Varro, Columella and Virgil would also include descriptions of the workings of wine presses in their agricultural treatises. Yet despite their frequent mentions in ancient writings and archaeological evidence showing the presence of wine presses throughout the Roman Empire, their use was actually relatively rare. This was because having a wine press was a very expensive and large piece of equipment that most Roman farmers, outside the estate holding patricians and the most wealthy plebeians, could not afford. Instead, it was much more common for Roman estates to have large tanks or troughs where grapes were trod upon by feet or paddles.

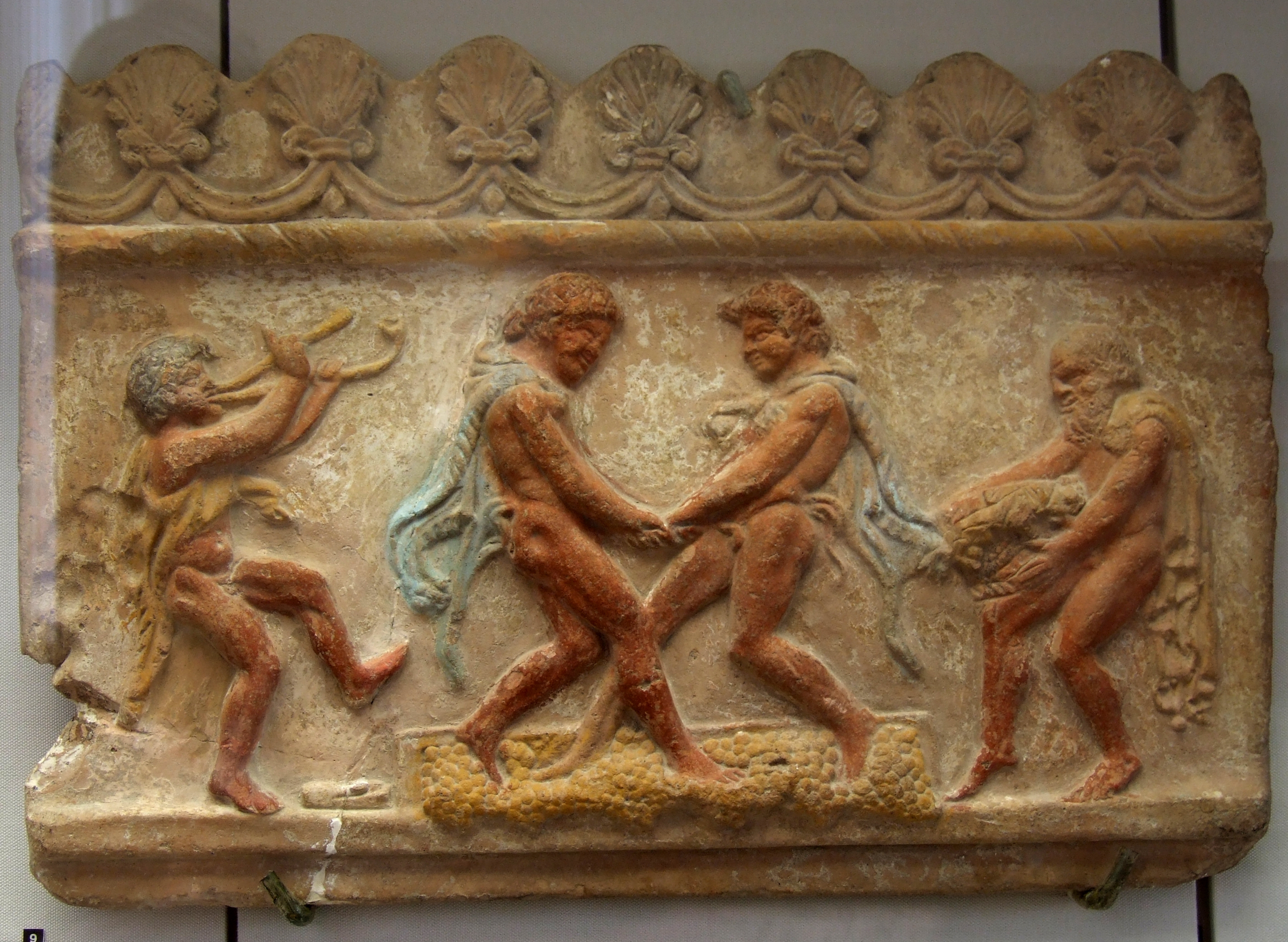
A Roman architectural relief from the 1st century AD showing that grape treading was still widely used as a means of pressing wine grapes during Roman times

Varro also described in his work De re rustica a type of "pressed wine" known as lorca that was produced by the left over grape skins being soaked in water that was served to slaves and farm workers.

By the 2nd century AD, the Romans began using a "screw press" that would be the predecessor to the basket press that would become popular in the Middle Ages. This press would include a large beam with a hole cut out of the middle through which a screw was fitted. Attached the base of the beam was a cut piece of stone that fit the circumference of a vat that was lined with porous clay or cloth. Ropes and pulleys attached to the beam would raise the beam and stone above the vat that would be loaded with grapes. Then six to eight workers (usually slaves) would be divided on either side of the screw. The workers would walk clockwise, turning the screw as it the stone descended upon the grapes, providing added pressure with each turn. A hole or spout at the bottom of the vat would allow the juice to drain out where it was usually moved by bucket into amphorae or other large fermentation vessels. A replica of this style of Roman screw press still exists at a winery in Beaucaire, Gard, in the Languedoc wine region of France.

== Middle ages and the increasing popularity of the basket press ==
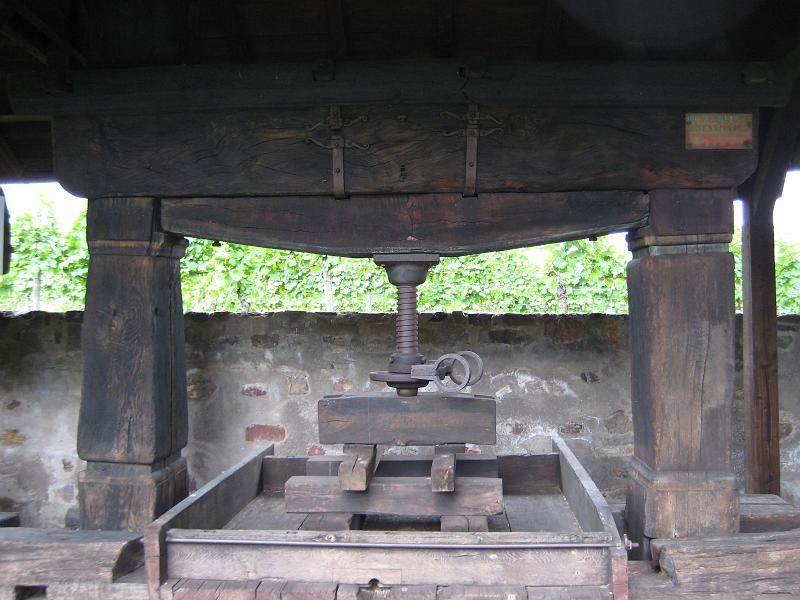
An old horizontal wine press that used wooden planks and a square base to exert pressure on the grape skins

In the Middle Ages, most winemaking technology advances were made by religious orders (particularly in France and Germany) who owned vast amounts of vineyard land and produced large quantities of wines in their abbeys and bishoprics. It was here that the basket press became popular. The press included a large cylindrical basket made of wood staves bound together by wood or metal rings with a heavy horizontal disc fitted at the top. After the grapes were loaded into the basket, the disc would depress towards the bottom with juice seeping out between the staves into a waiting basin or tray. In some presses, added pressure would come from a giant lever or manual hand crank.

While the basket press was becoming more widely used by Church-owned estates in France and Germany, winemaking in the Iberian Peninsula and by small local farmers throughout Europe was still mostly down by treading in stone lagers. However, there are many church records that showed feudal land tenants were willing to pay a portion of their crop to use a landlord's wine press if it was available. This was probably due in part to the added volume of wine (anywhere from 15 to 20%) that pressing could produce versus treading. But safety could have also been a driving force since many parish records from the period reported wine cellar workers suffocating to death (from the released carbon dioxide) while treading fermenting wine grapes in a vat.

=== Press fractions ===
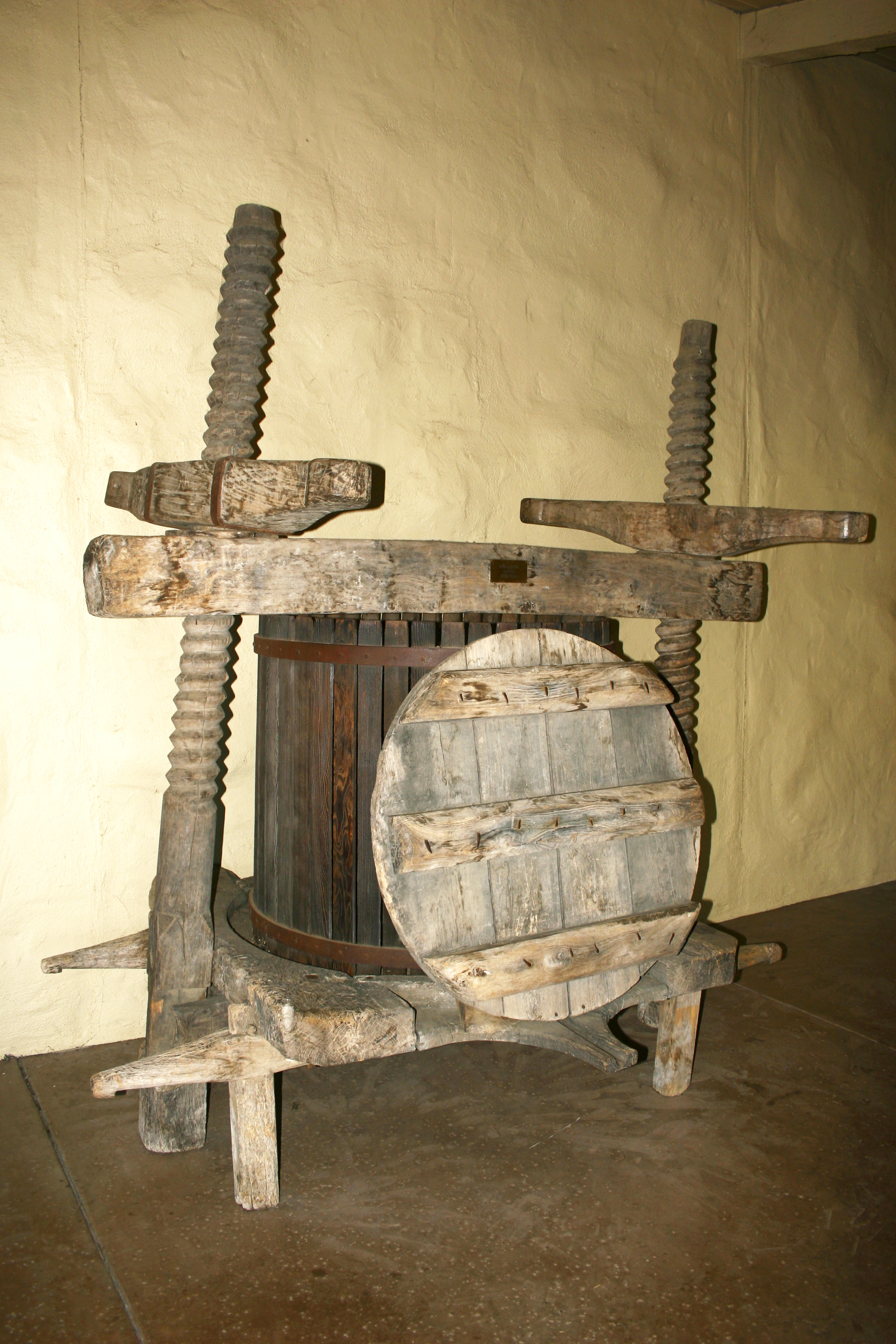
A 16th-century basket press

As the use of the basket press became more popular, wineries and wine writers started to make a distinction between the quality of wine that came from different levels of pressing. The highest quality was the vin de goutte or the "free run" juice that was released by the mere weight of the grapes squeezing each other as they were loaded into the press. This was usually the lightest in colour and body and was often kept separate from the vin de presse that came from pressing which was darker and had more tannins. In 1600, French wine writer Olivier de Serres noted in his work Théâtre d'Agriculture that it was a tradition associated only with the wines of Anjou in the Loire Valley to blend in the vin de goutte with the vin de presse. Much like the ancient Roman pressed wine lorca, Middle Age peasants often drank piquette from the left over grape skins after pressing.

Nowhere was the analysis of the difference in press fractions more astute than in the Champagne wine region where Dom Pérignon was recorded in 1718 by biographer Canon Godinot to have laid out these specifications for how the press fractions of juice destined to be Champagne should be handled. First the pressing were to happen quickly, as soon after harvest as possible to keep the juice at its freshest and to avoid any coloring from the red wine grapes of Pinot noir and Pinot Meunier. The free run vin de goutte was considered too delicate and lacking on its own to make fine Champagne and it was sometimes discarded or used for other wines. The first and second pressings (called tailles or cut since the pomace cake was literally cut with ropes, chains or paddles to remove it between pressings) were the most ideal for sparkling wine production. The juice of the third pressing was considered acceptable but the fourth pressing (called the vin de taille) was rarely used and all other pressings after that (the vins de pressoirs were considered too harsh and colored to be of any value in Champagne production.

== Changing styles ==
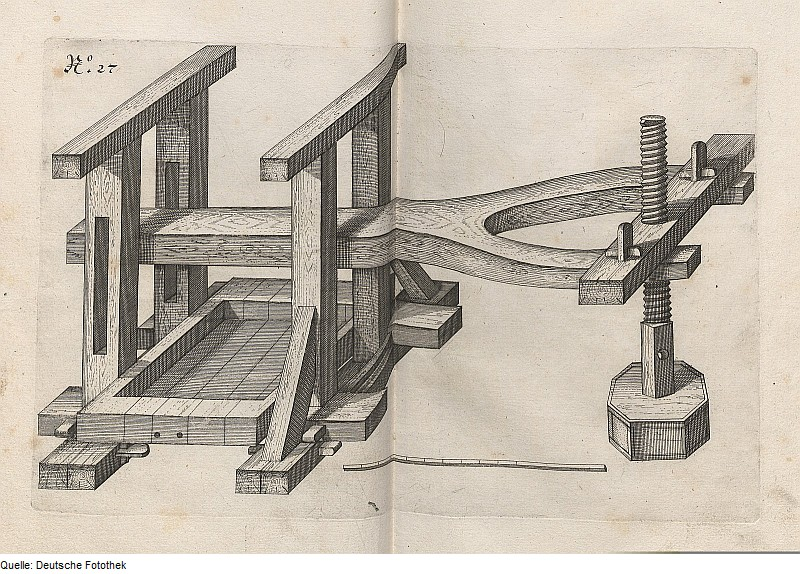
A 1649 drawing of a German horizontal wine press

In the 17th and 18th century, the style of winemaking in France was for heartier wines that could age and survive long transport voyages overseas. Winemaking texts such as the 1803 annotated and updated edition of de Serres' Théâtre d'Agriculture began recommending that all fine producers employ the use of a wine press and that sometimes blending in a bit of the vin de presse to enhance color and body was essential to create a wine that could last. Even in Bordeaux, which was still using lagars long after Burgundy, Champagne and other French wine regions had adopted the basket press, saw the use of a wine press become more popular after darker, more full bodied wines of Ho-Bryan produced by Lord Arnaud III de Pontac began to receive wide acclaim from English writers such as Jonathan Swift, John Locke and Samuel Pepys. By the end of the 18th century, nearly all prestigious Bordeaux wine estates were following de Pontac's method of giving the grapes more time to ferment in the vat and then using a basket press on the darker vin vermeilh and pressing it into new oak barrels.

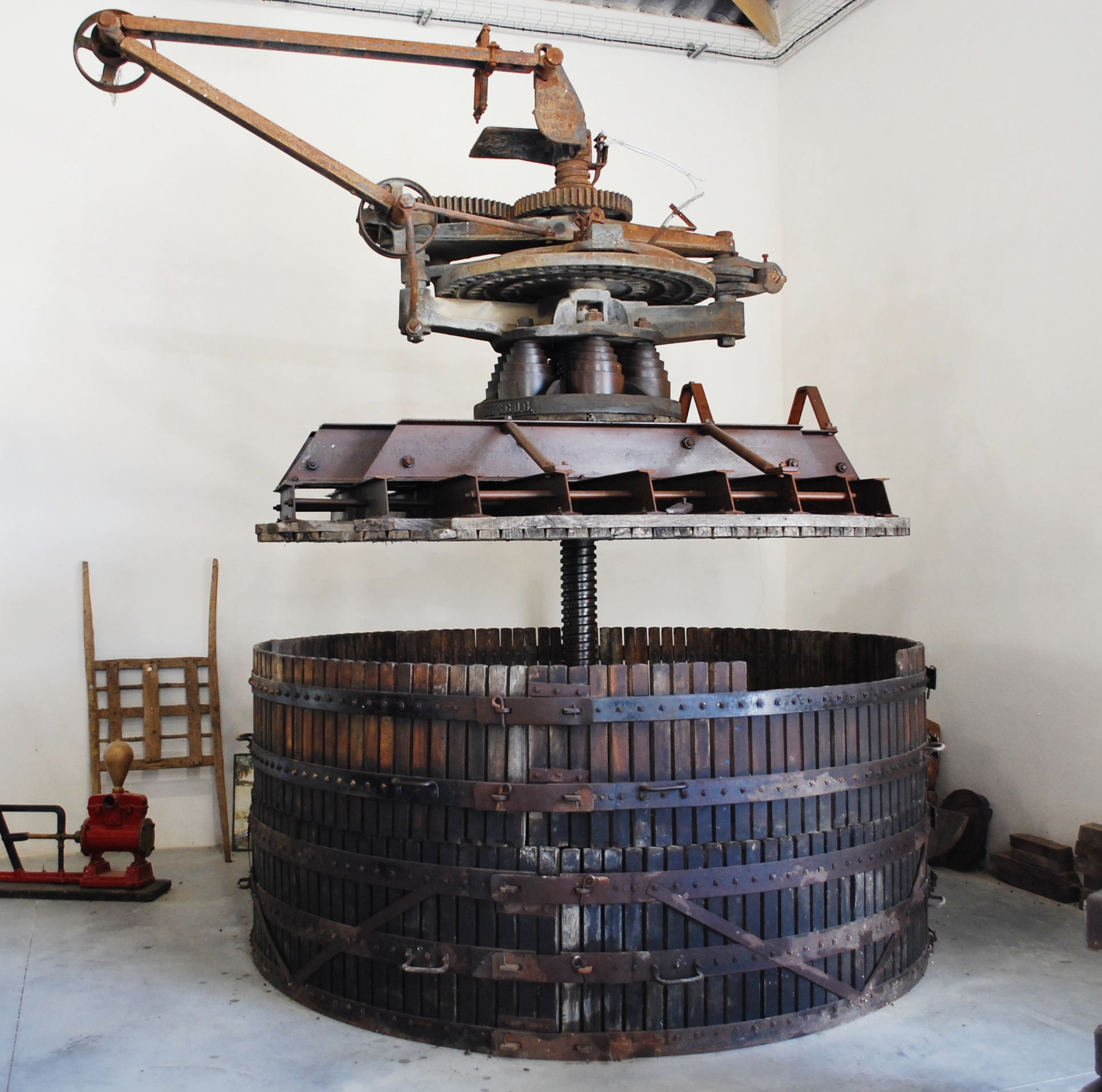
A basket press from the Provence region of southeast France

The advancement of steam power machinery in the 19th century brought about a revolution in wine press technology as manual basket press gave way to steam-powered presses that greatly increased the efficiency of pressing and reduced the amount of labor needed to operate a press. Even the advancement of rail transport had a positive influence as the cost of transporting large wine presses from manufacturers to wine regions throughout the globe decreased and more wineries were able to afford to purchase a wine press.

== Modern presses ==
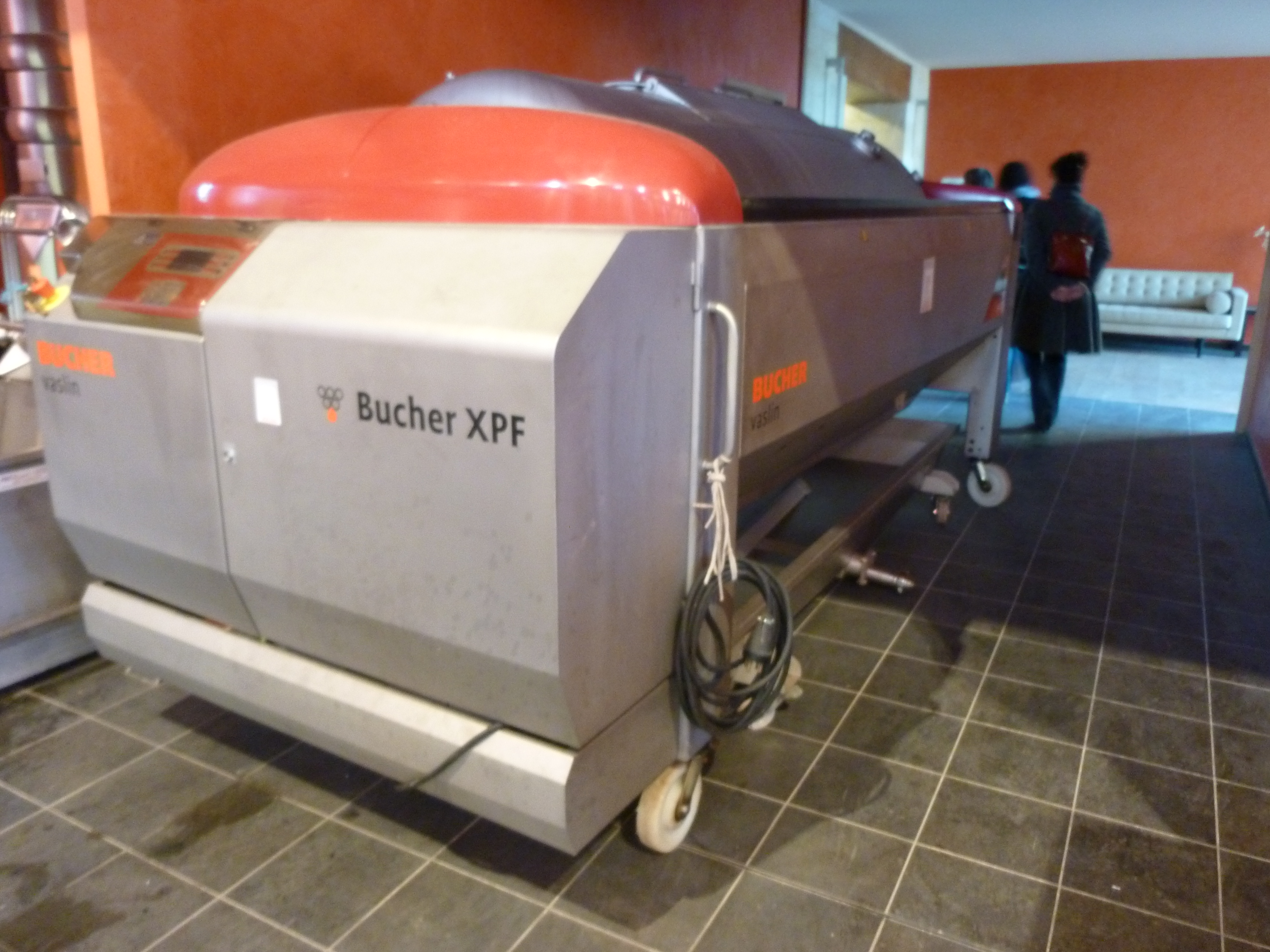
A modern pneumatic batch press

With relatively modest changes, the basket press has continued to be widely used for centuries since its introduction by both small artisan winemakers to large Champagne houses. In Europe, basket presses with hydraulic machinery can be found throughout Sauternes, Burgundy and parts of Italy.

In the 20th century, wine presses advanced from the vertical style pressing of the basket press and ancient wine press to horizontal pressing with pressure either being applied at one or both ends or from the side through the use of an airbag or bladder. These new presses were categorized as "batch", which like the basket press had to have the pomace emptied and grapes reloaded, and as "continuous" where a belt or Archimedes' screw would subject the grapes/pomace to increasing pressure from one end of the press to the other with new grapes being added and the pomace being continuously removed.

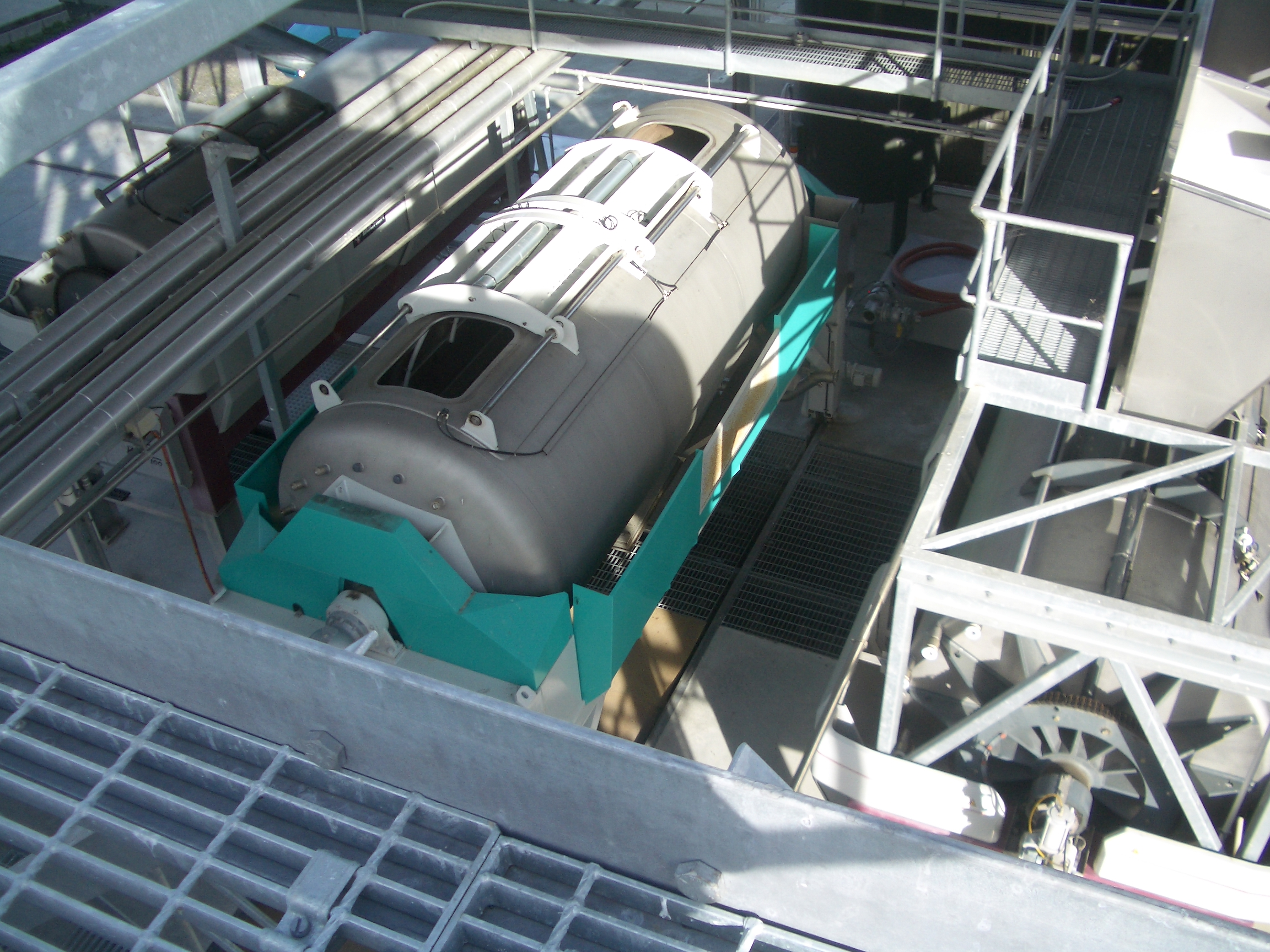
Large "tank" presses that are fully enclosed can be used for anaerobic winemaking.

Another advancement in the horizontal batch press was the complete enclosure of the press (sometimes called "tank press") that reduced the exposure of the grape must to air. Some advance presses can even be flushed with nitrogen to create a complete anaerobic environment that can be desired for wine making with white wine grapes. Additionally, many of today's modern presses are computerized which allows the operator to control exactly how much pressure is being applied to the grape skins and for how many cycles.
