= Apple flour =

Flour milled from dried apples

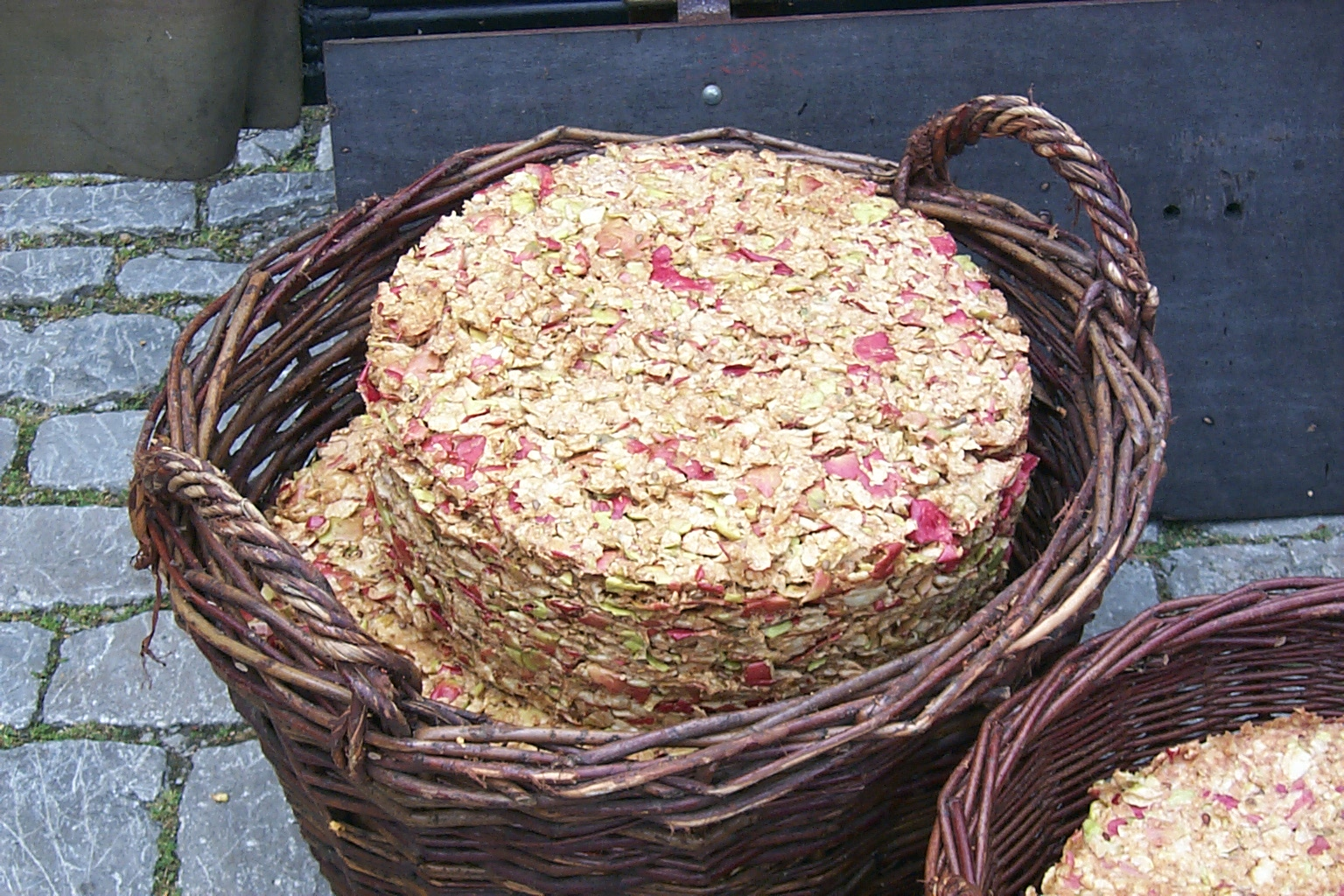
Apple pressings such as these left over from the processing of apple juice or apple cider are the precursor to apple flour.

Apple flour is flour made from the milling of apple pomace, a mix of about 54% pulp, 34% peels, 7% seeds, 4% seed cores, and 2% stems remaining after apples have been squeezed and crushed for their juice. It is also called "apple pomace flour", which contains higher amounts of dietary fiber than refined white flour.

== See also ==
- Almond meal
- Banana flour
- Maize flour
- Mesquite flour
- Peasemeal
- Peanut flour
- Rice flour
