= Flour =

Cereal, seed, vegetable or root ground into powder

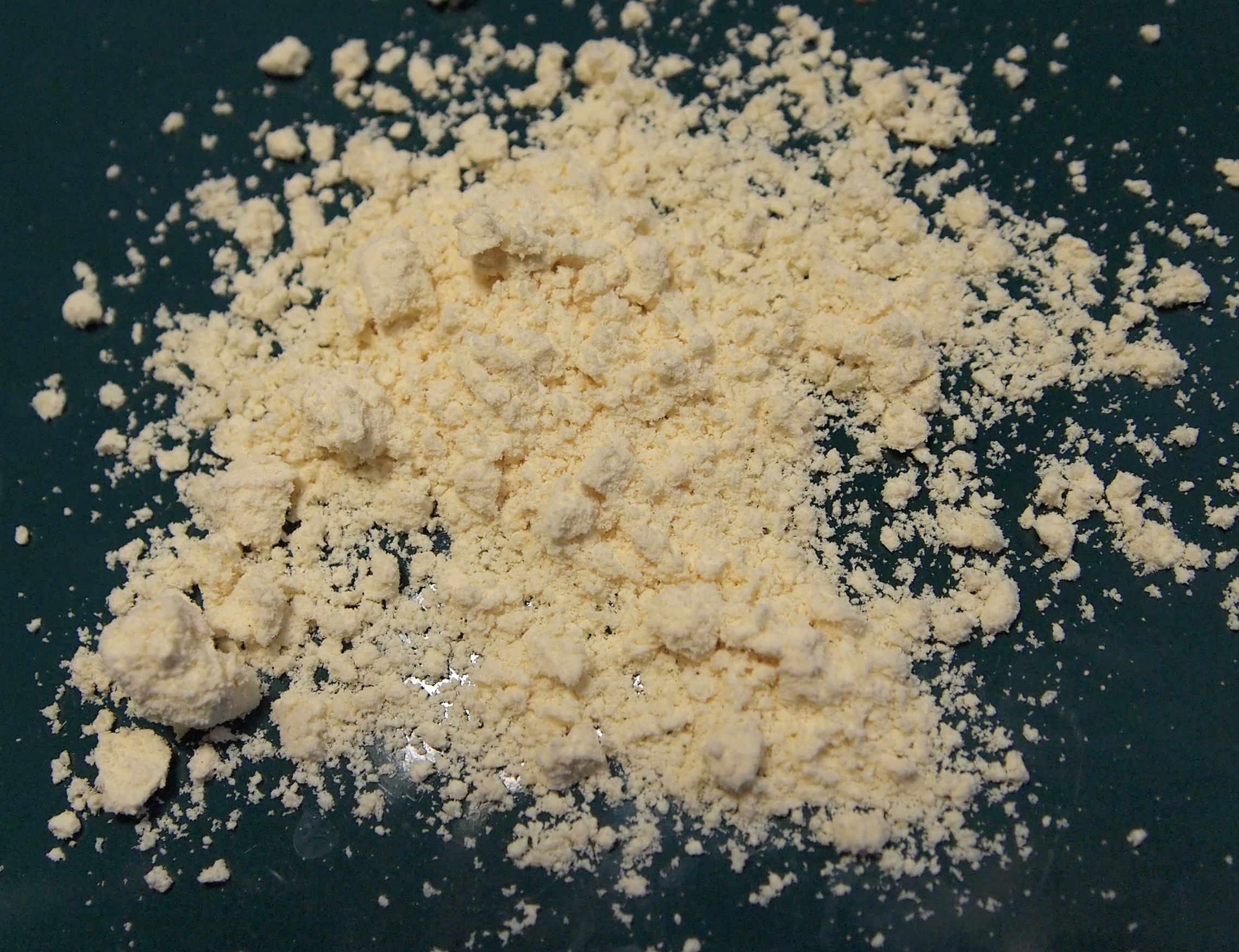
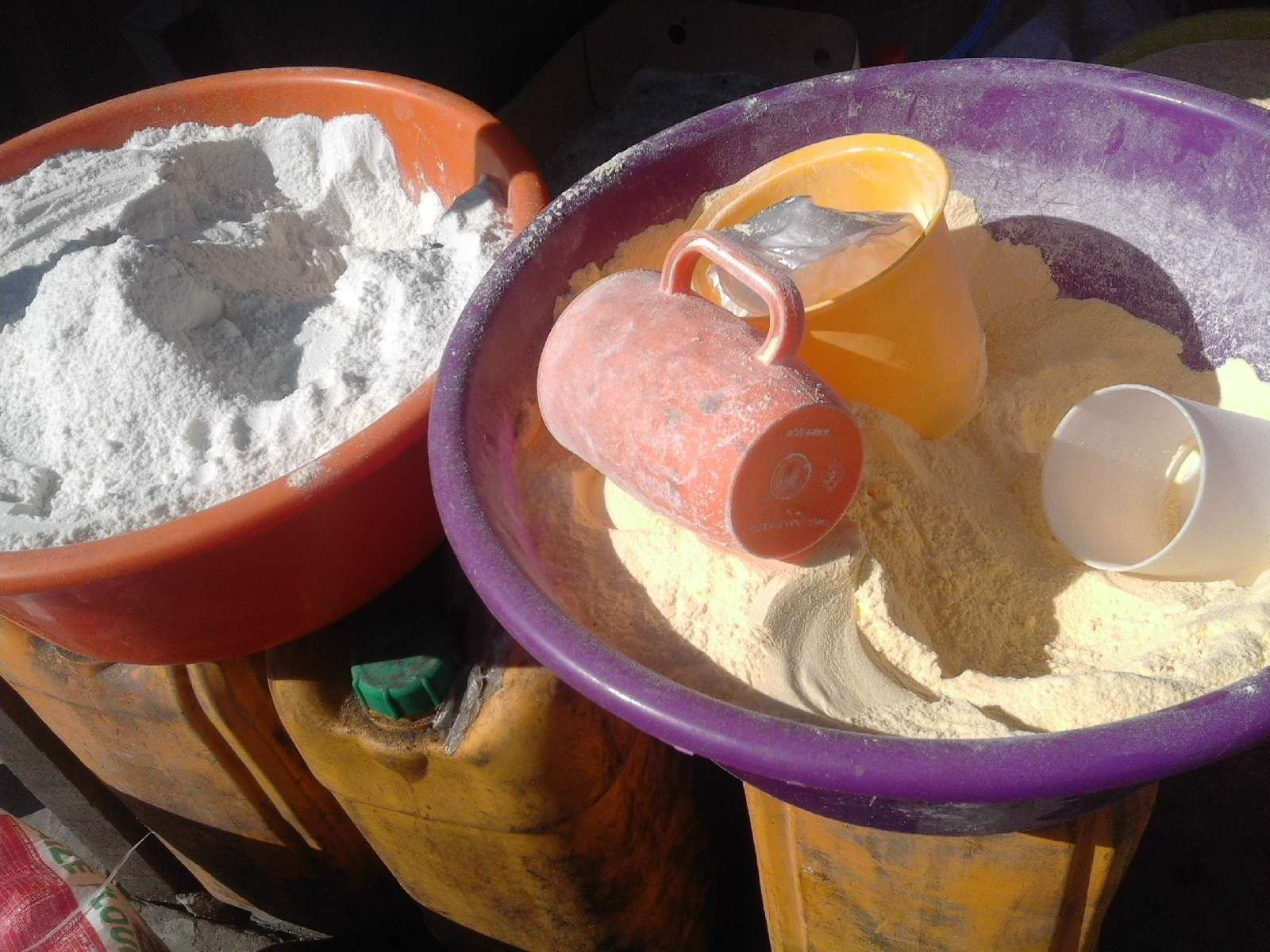
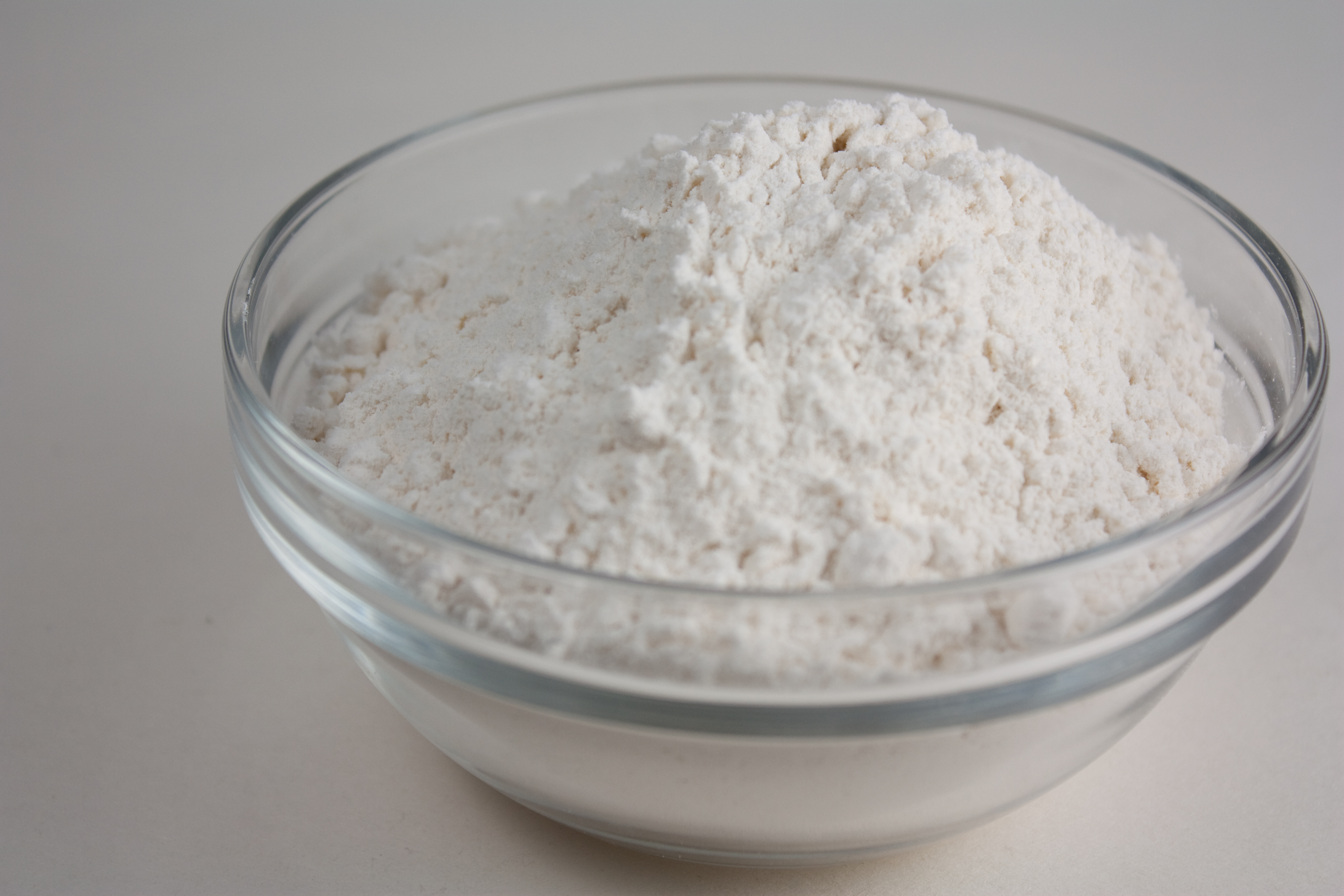
- Kinako, a soya bean based flour from Japan Cassava flour (left) and corn flour (right) are basic ingredients for the cuisine of Central Africa. All-purpose or plain flour
- Variations: Cereal; Bean; Nuts; Seeds; Roots; Vegetables

Flour is a powder used to make many different foods, including baked goods, as well as thickening dishes. It is made by grinding grains, beans, nuts, seeds, roots, or vegetables using a mill.

Cereal flour, particularly wheat flour, is the main ingredient of bread, which is a staple food for many cultures. Archaeologists have found evidence of humans making cereal flour over 32,000 years ago. Other cereal flours include corn flour, which has been important in Mesoamerican cuisine since ancient times and remains a staple in the Americas, while rye flour is a constituent of bread in both Central Europe and Northern Europe. Cereal flour consists either of the endosperm, germ, and bran together, known as whole-grain flour, or of the endosperm alone, which is known as refined flour. 'Meal' is technically differentiable from flour as having slightly coarser particle size, known as degree of comminution. However, the word 'meal' is synonymous with 'flour' in some parts of the world. The processing of cereal flour to produce white flour, where the outer layers are removed, means nutrients are lost. Such flour, and the breads made from them, may be fortified by adding nutrients. As of 2016, it is a legal requirement in 86 countries to fortify wheat flour.

Nut flour is made by grinding blanched nuts, except for walnut flour, for which the oil is extracted first. Nut flour is a popular gluten-free alternative, being used within the "keto" and "paleo" diets. None of the nuts' nutritional benefits are lost during the grinding process. Nut flour has traditionally been used in Mediterranean and Persian cuisine.

Bean flours are made by grinding beans that have been either dried or roasted. Commonly used bean flours include chickpea, also known as gram flour or besan, made from dried chickpeas and traditionally used in Mediterranean, Middle Eastern and Indian cuisine. Soybean flour is made by soaking the beans to dehull them, before they are dried (or roasted to make kinako) and ground down; at least 97% of the product must pass through a 100-mesh standard screen to be called soya flour, which is used in many Asian cuisines.

Seed flours like teff are traditional to Ethiopia and Eritrea, where they are used to make flatbread and sourdough, while buckwheat has been traditionally used in Russia, Japan and Italy. In Australia, millstones to grind seed have been found that date from the Pleistocene period.

Root flours include arrowroot and cassava. Arrowroot flour (also known as arrowroot powder) is used as a thickener in sauces, soups and pies, and has twice the thickening power of wheat flour. Cassava flour is gluten-free and used as an alternative to wheat flour. Cassava flour is traditionally used in African, South and Central American and Caribbean food.

Vegetable flour is made from vegetables that are dehydrated before they are milled. These can be made from most vegetables, including broccoli, spinach, squash and green peas. They are rich in fibre and are gluten-free. There have been studies to see if vegetable flour can be added to wheat-flour-based bread as an alternative to using other enrichment methods.

== Etymology ==
The English word flour is originally a variant of the word flower, and both words derive from the Old French fleur or flour, which had the literal meaning "blossom", and a figurative meaning "the finest". The phrase fleur de farine meant "the finest part of the flour", since flour resulted from the elimination of coarse and unwanted matter from the grain during milling.

The spellings flower and flour continued to coexist until the early nineteenth century, when flour became established for the milled-grain sense.

== History ==
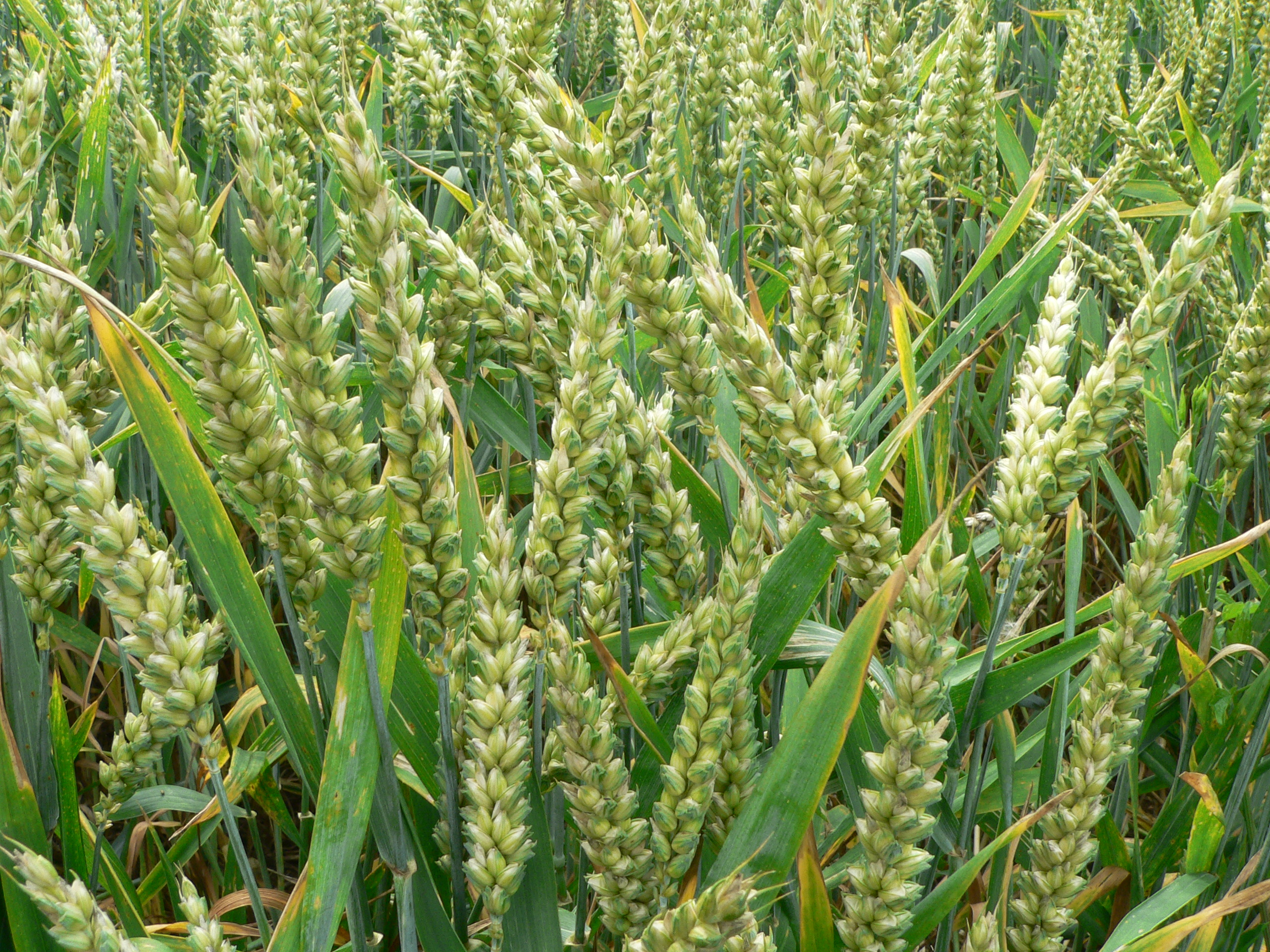
A field of unripe wheat

Maize or corn flour has been important in Mesoamerican cuisine since ancient times and remains a staple in the Americas. Rye flour is a constituent of bread in central and northern Europe. Archaeological evidence for making wheat flour dates to at least 6000 BC. In Australia, excavations at the site of Madjedbebe found grindstone used to grind seed dating from the Pleistocene period. In 2018, archaeologists reported finding evidence of bread making at Shubayqa 1, a Natufian hunter-gatherer site more than 14,000 years old in northwest Jordan. The Romans were the first to grind cereals on cone mills. In 1786, at the beginning of the Industrial Era, the first steam-powered flour mill, Albion Mills, Southwark, was completed in London. In the 1930s, some flour began to be enriched with iron, niacin, thiamine and riboflavin. In the 1940s, mills started to enrich flour and folic acid was added to the list in the 1990s.

=== Degermed and heat-processed flour ===
An important problem of the Industrial Revolution was the preservation of flour. Transportation distances and a relatively slow distribution system collided with natural shelf life. The reason for the limited shelf life is the fatty acids of the germ, which react from the moment they are exposed to oxygen. This occurs when grain is milled; the fatty acids oxidize and flour starts to become rancid. Depending on climate and grain quality, this process takes six to nine months. In the late 19th century, this process was too short for an industrial production and distribution cycle. As vitamins, micronutrients and amino acids were completely or relatively unknown in the late 19th century, removing the germ was an effective solution. Without the germ, flour cannot become rancid. Degermed flour became standard. Degermation started in densely populated areas and took approximately one generation to reach the countryside. Heat-processed flour is flour where the germ is first separated from the endosperm and bran, then processed with steam, dry heat or microwave and blended into flour again.

== Production ==
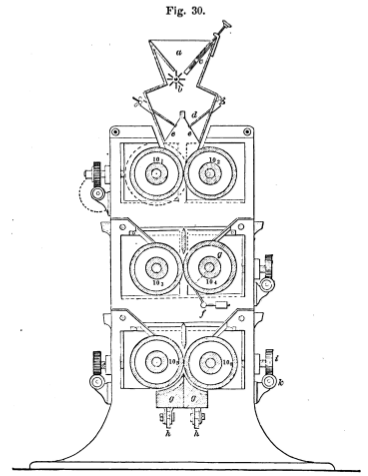
A Walz set of roller mills

Milling of flour is accomplished by grinding grain between stones or steel wheels. Today, "stone-ground" usually means that the grain has been ground in a mill in which a revolving stone wheel turns over a stationary stone wheel, vertically or horizontally with the grain in between.

Roller mills replaced stone grist mills in the 19th century. The production of flour has historically driven technological development, as attempts to make gristmills and flour mills more productive and less labor-intensive led to the watermill and windmill. These terms are now applied more broadly to uses of water and wind power for purposes other than milling. More recently, the Unifine mill, an impact-type mill, was developed in the mid-20th century.

== Composition of cereal flour ==
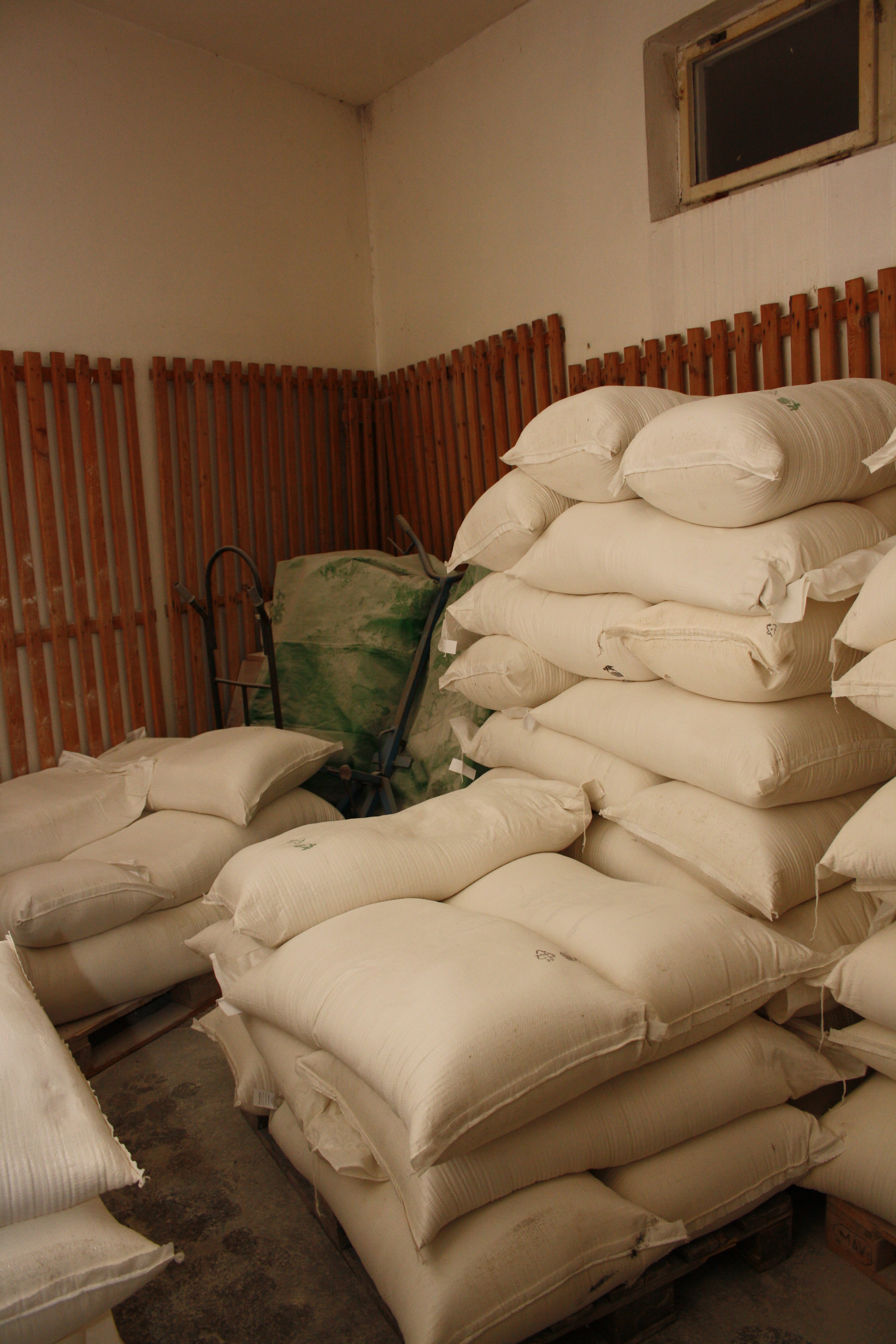
Flour being stored in large cloth sacks

Flour contains a high proportion of starches, which are a subset of complex carbohydrates also known as polysaccharides. The kinds of flour used in cooking include all-purpose (North America) or plain flour, self-rising (North America) or self-raising flour, and, in North America, cake flour. The higher the protein content, the harder and stronger the flour, and the more it will produce crispy or chewy breads. The lower the protein, the softer the flour, which is better for cakes, cookies, and pie crusts. Cereal flour consists either of the endosperm, germ, and bran together (whole-grain flour) or of the endosperm alone (refined flour).

=== Bleached flour ===
"Bleached flour" is "refined" flour with a chemical whitening (bleaching) agent added. "Refined" flour has had the germ and bran, containing much of the nutritional fibre and vitamins, removed and is often referred to as "white flour".

Bleached flour is artificially aged using a "bleaching" agent, a "maturing" agent, or both. A bleaching agent affects the carotenoids responsible for the natural colour of the flour; a "maturing" agent also affects gluten development. A maturing agent may either strengthen or weaken gluten development.

This is still available in North America, but has been banned in Europe, Australia and New Zealand.

==== Additives ====
The four most common additives used as bleaching or maturing agents in the US are:

- Potassium bromate, listed as an ingredient, is a maturing agent that strengthens gluten development. It does not bleach.
- Benzoyl peroxide bleaches, but does not act as a maturing agent. It has no effect on gluten.
- Ascorbic acid (vitamin C) is listed as an ingredient, either as an indication that the flour was matured using ascorbic acid or that a small amount is added as a dough enhancer. It is a maturing agent that strengthens gluten development, but does not bleach.
- Chlorine gas is used as both a bleaching agent and a maturing agent. It weakens gluten development and oxidizes starches, making it easier for the flour to absorb water and swell, resulting in thicker batters and stiffer doughs. The retarded gluten formation is desirable in cakes, cookies, and biscuits, as it would otherwise make them tougher and bread-like. The modification of starches in the flour allows the use of wetter doughs (making for a moister end product) without destroying the structure necessary for light, fluffy cakes and biscuits. Chlorinated flour allows cakes and other baked goods to set faster and rise better, and the fat to be distributed more evenly, with less vulnerability to collapse.

Some other chemicals used as flour treatment agents to modify color and baking properties include:

- Chlorine dioxide (unstable to be transported in the US)
- Calcium peroxide
- Azodicarbonamide or azobisformamide (synthetic)
- Atmospheric oxygen, which causes natural bleaching.

Common preservatives in commercial flour include:

- Calcium propanoate
- Sodium benzoate
- Tricalcium phosphate
- Butylated hydroxyanisole

==== Frequency of additives ====
All bleaching and maturing agents (with the possible exception of ascorbic acid) have been banned in the United Kingdom.

Bromination of flour in the US has fallen out of favor, and while it is not yet actually banned anywhere, few retail flours available to the home baker are bromated anymore.

Many varieties of flour packaged specifically for commercial bakeries are still bromated. Retail bleached flour marketed to the home baker is now treated mostly with either peroxidation or chlorine gas. Current information from Pillsbury is that their varieties of bleached flour are treated both with benzoyl peroxide and chlorine gas. Gold Medal states that their bleached flour is treated either with benzoyl peroxide or chlorine gas, but no way exists to tell which process has been used when buying the flour at the grocery store.

==== Old method of bleaching ====
The old method of procuring white or "bleached" flour did not entail the use of chemical agents at all. Rather, the wheat kernels were moistened with water long enough for the outer kernels of the wheat which contained the bran to soften and, eventually, fall off while grinding. In some places, the leaves of Syrian rue (Peganum harmala) were spread in stratified layers between the layers of grain, and left in such a state for several days, until the fumes emitted from the astringent leaves of the plant caused the outer kernels of the wheat to break down and dissolve, leaving a clean and white flour after grinding.

=== Enriched flour ===
During the process of making flour, specifically as a result of the bleaching process, nutrients are lost. Some of these nutrients may be replaced during refining – the result is known as enriched flour. In the UK most flour, and consequently breads made with it, is required to be fortified with added calcium, iron, thiamine (Vitamin B1) and niacin (Vitamin B3); wholemeal flour is exempt as it inherently contains sufficient amounts of these nutrients.

=== Cake flour ===
Cake flour is the lowest in gluten protein content, with 6–7% (5–8% from second source) protein to produce minimal binding so the cake "crumbles" easily.

=== Pastry flour ===
Pastry flour has the second-lowest gluten protein content, with 7.5–9.5% (8–9% from second source) protein to hold together with a bit more strength than cakes, but still produce flaky crusts rather than hard or crispy ones.

=== Plain or all-purpose flour ===
All-purpose, or "AP flour", or plain flour is medium in gluten protein content at 9.5–11.5% (10–12% from second source) protein content. It has adequate protein content for many bread and pizza bases, though bread flour and special 00 grade Italian flour are often preferred for these purposes, respectively, especially by artisan bakers. Some biscuits are also prepared using this type of flour. "Plain" refers not only to AP flour's middling gluten content but also to its lack of any added leavening agent (as in self-rising flour).

=== Bread flour ===
Bread flour is typically made from hard red winter wheat planted in the fall and harvested in the spring. Hard wheat is high in gluten, a protein that makes dough stretchy. Hard wheat is 11.5–13.5% (12–14% from second source) protein. The increased protein binds to the flour to entrap carbon dioxide released by the yeast fermentation process, resulting in a better rise and chewier texture.

=== Hard flour ===
Hard is a general term for flours with high gluten protein content, commonly refers to extra strong flour, with 13.5–16% (or 14–15% from some sources) protein (16% is a theoretically possible protein content). This flour may be used where a recipe adds ingredients that require the dough to be extra strong to hold together in their presence, or when strength is needed for constructions of bread (e.g., some centerpiece displays).

=== Gluten flour ===
Gluten flour is refined gluten protein, or a theoretical 100% protein (though practical refining never achieves a full 100%). It is used to strengthen flour as needed. For example, adding approximately one teaspoon per cup of AP flour gives the resulting mix the protein content of bread flour. It is commonly added to whole grain flour recipes to overcome the tendency of greater fiber content to interfere with gluten development, needed to give the bread better rising (gas holding) qualities and chew.

=== Unbleached flour ===
Unbleached flour is simply flour that has not undergone bleaching and therefore does not have the color of "white" flour. An example is graham flour, whose namesake, Sylvester Graham, was against using bleaching agents, which he considered unhealthy.

=== Self-raising flour ===
In English-speaking countries, self-raising (or self-rising in North America) flour is commercially available with chemical leavening agents already in the mix. In America, it is also likely to be pre-salted; in Britain this is not the case. The added ingredients are evenly distributed throughout the flour, which aids a consistent rise in baked goods. This flour is generally used for preparing amongst others sponge cakes, scones and muffins. It was invented by Henry Jones and patented in 1845. If a recipe calls for self-raising flour, and this is not available, the following substitution is possible:

- 1 cup (~240 mL) (125 g) plain flour
- 1 tsp (5 mL) (3 g) baking powder
- (US recipes) a pinch to 1/4 teaspoon (1 g or less) salt

=== Multigrain ===
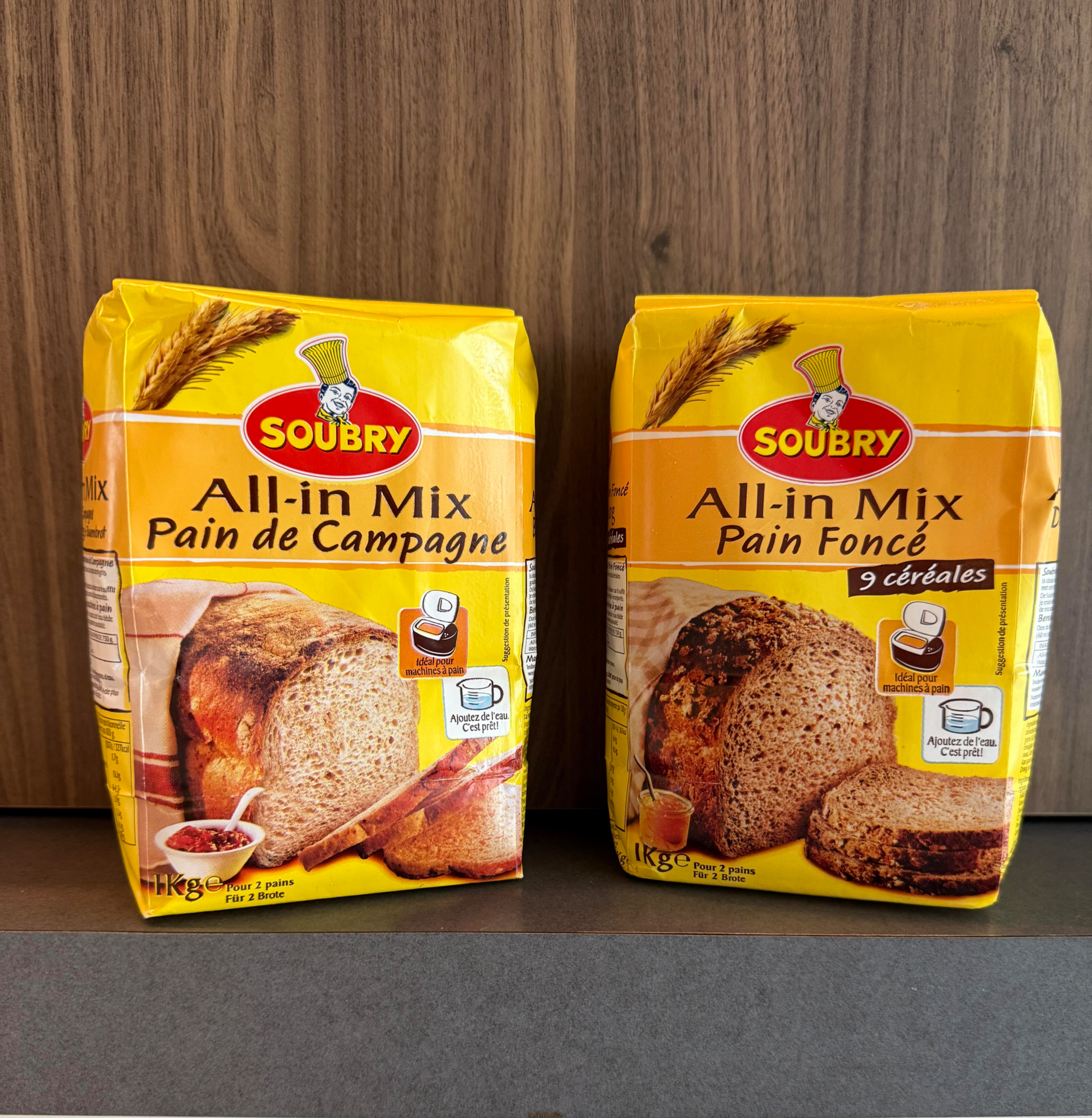
Left: whole wheat flour; right: multigrain flour.

Multigrain flour is a blend of two or more different grains, offering a more complex nutritional profile than single grain flours.

Common grains used in multigrain flours are barley, oats, whole wheat, millets, corn, rye, spelt, and buckwheat. Some multigrain flours may additionally contain pulses or other legumes.

Multigrain flour usually has a coarser texture and a more dense, hearty consistency than all-purpose flour, due to the presence of different grains. The texture of the dough may also change depending on the grain mixture. Some multigrain flours may absorb more water than others, particularly those made with whole grains, hence requiring modifications made to hydration levels in recipes. In general, more water is needed to make a dough with a whole grain flour than with a refined flour.

Compared to refined flour, multigrain flour typically has a lower glycemic index, which means that it releases glucose into the bloodstream more gradually and helps to avoid blood sugar spikes.

Some of the basic grains used to produce a multigrain flour

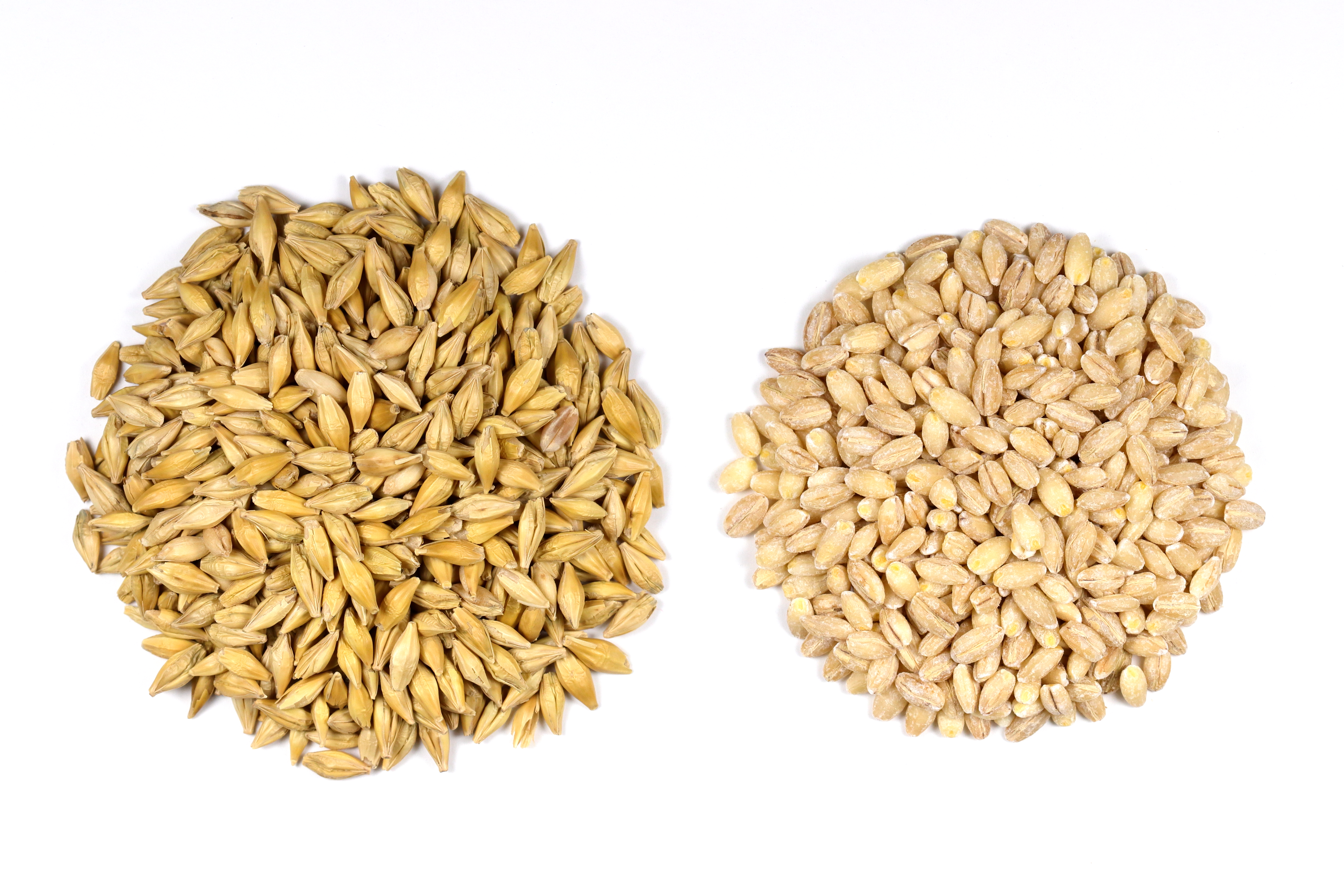
Barley grains with and without the outer husk

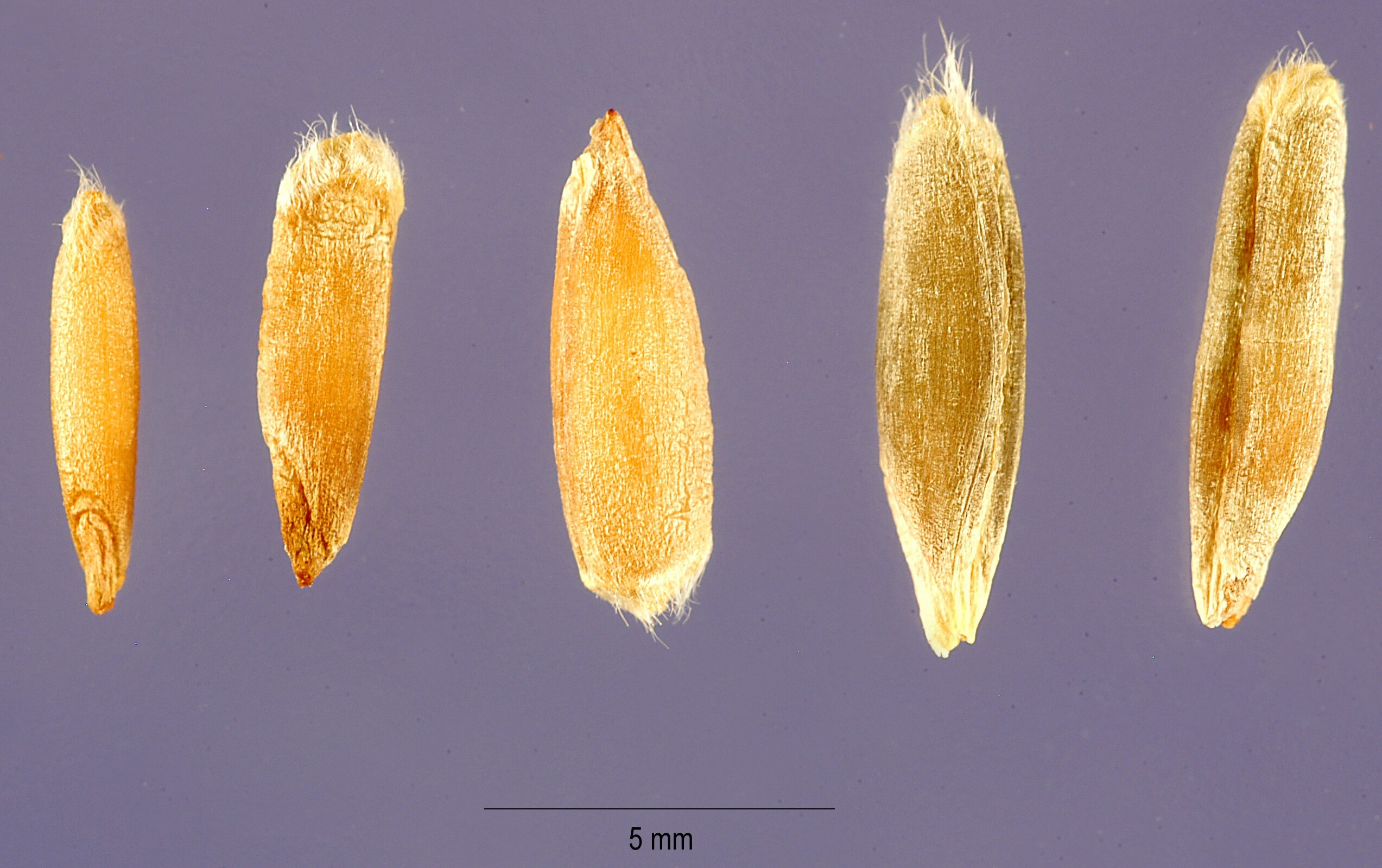
Different types of rye

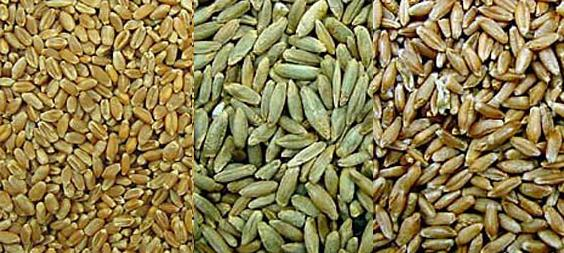
Grains of wheat, rye and their hybrid, triticale. Triticale is significantly larger than wheat.

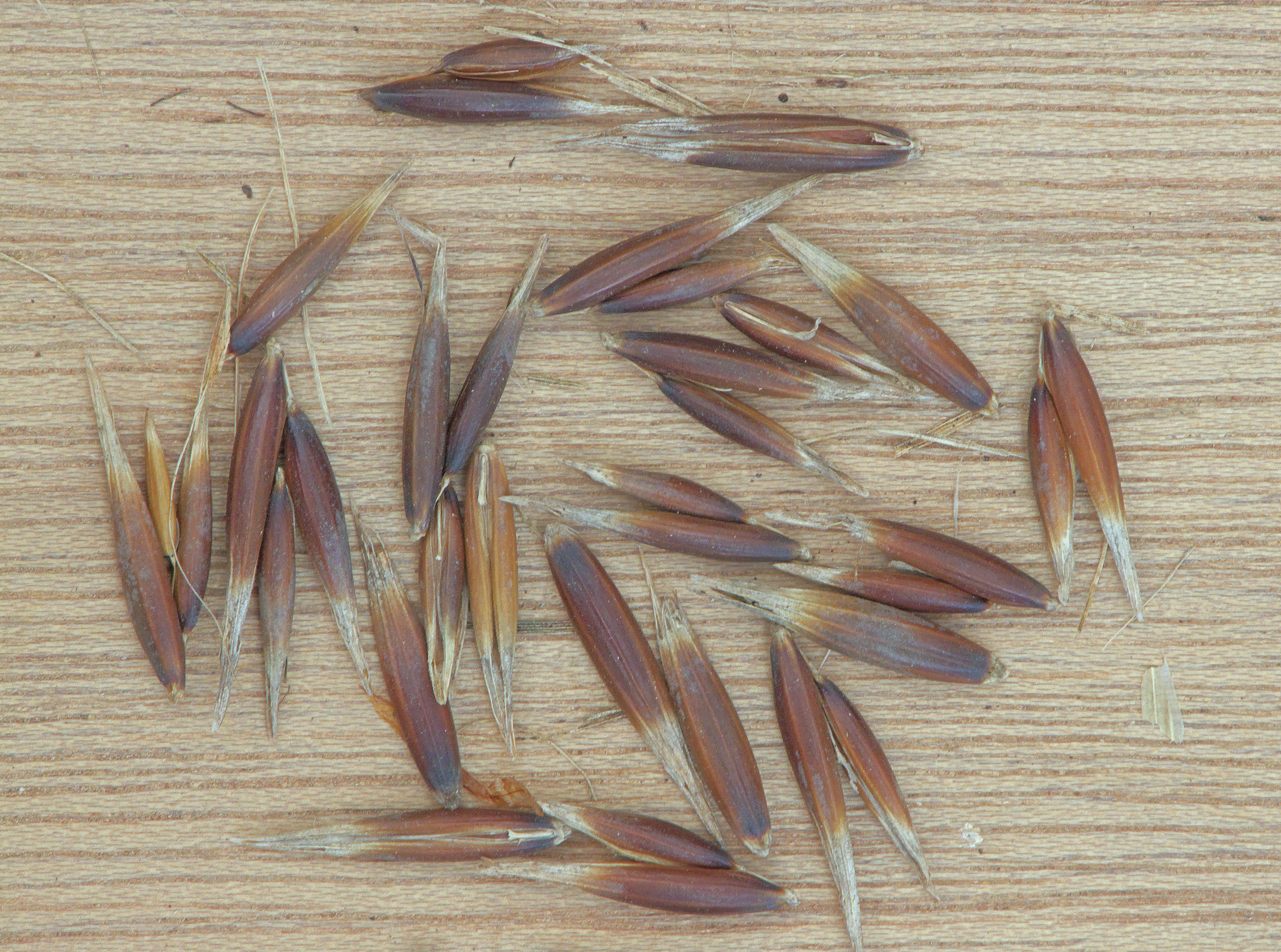
Black oat grains

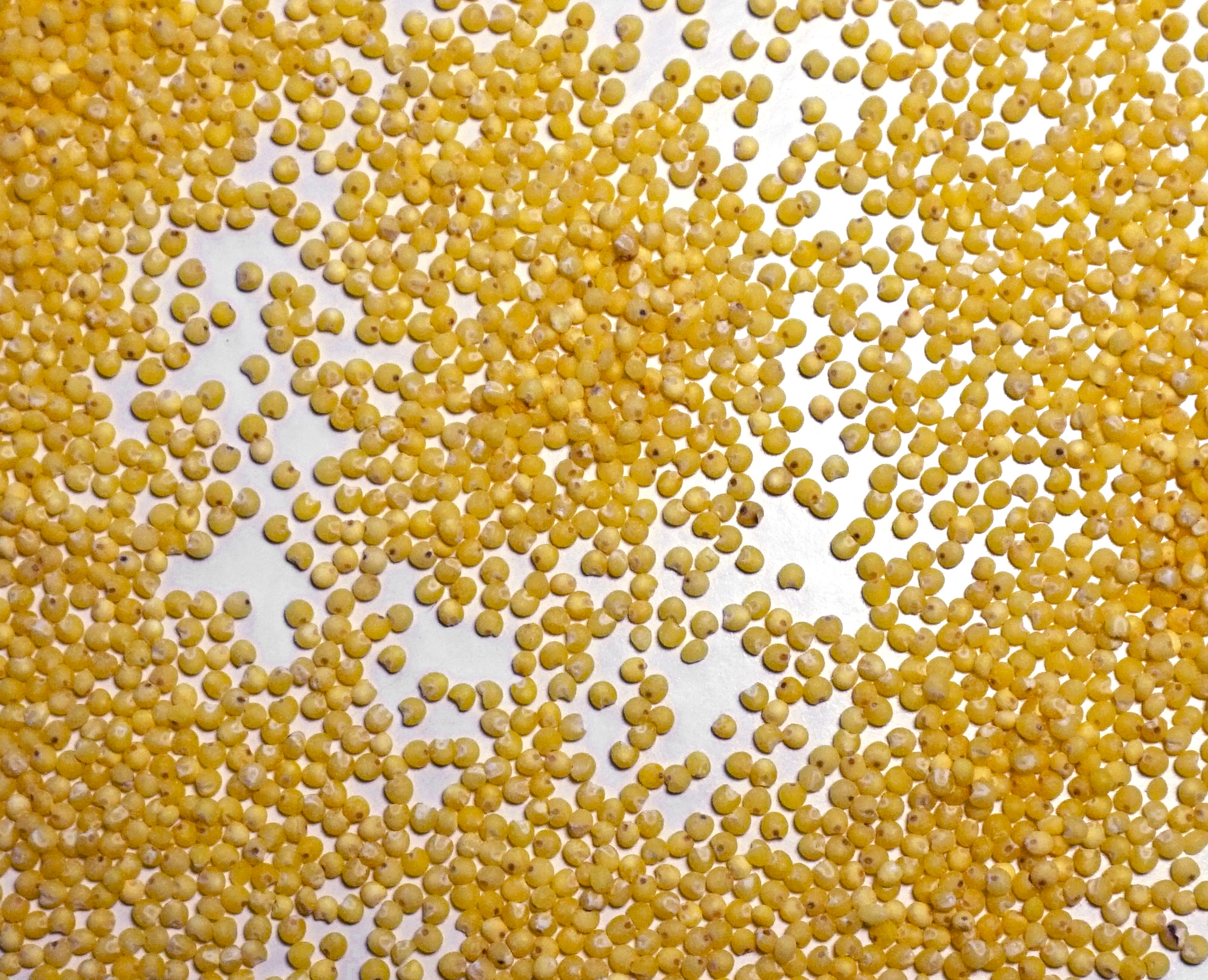
Millet grains

== List of flours ==
=== Gluten-containing flours ===
==== Wheat flour ====
Wheat is the most preferred cereal grain used to make flour. Flours can contain differing levels of the protein gluten. "Strong flour" or "hard flour" has a higher gluten content than "weak" or "soft" flour. "Brown" and wholemeal flours may be made of hard or soft wheat.

- Atta flour is a whole-grain wheat flour important in Indian and Pakistani cuisine, used for a range of breads, such as roti and chapati. It is usually stone-ground to coarse granules, which gives it a texture not easily found in other flatbreads.
- Common wheat flour (T. aestivum) is the flour most often used for making bread. Durum wheat flour (T. durum) is the second most used.
- Maida flour is a finely milled wheat flour used to make a wide variety of Indian breads such as paratha and naan. Maida is widely used not only in Indian cuisine but also in Central Asian and Southeast Asian cuisine. Though sometimes referred to as "all-purpose flour" by Indian chefs, it more closely resembles cake flour or even pure starch. In India, maida flour is used to make pastries and other bakery items such as bread, biscuits and toast.
- Noodle flour is a special blend of flour used for the making of Asian-style noodles, made from wheat or rice.
- Semolina is the coarse, purified wheat middlings of durum wheat used in making pasta, breakfast cereals, puddings, and couscous.
- Spelt, an ancient grain, is a hexaploid species of wheat. Spelt dough needs less kneading than common wheat or durum wheat dough.

==== Other cereals ====
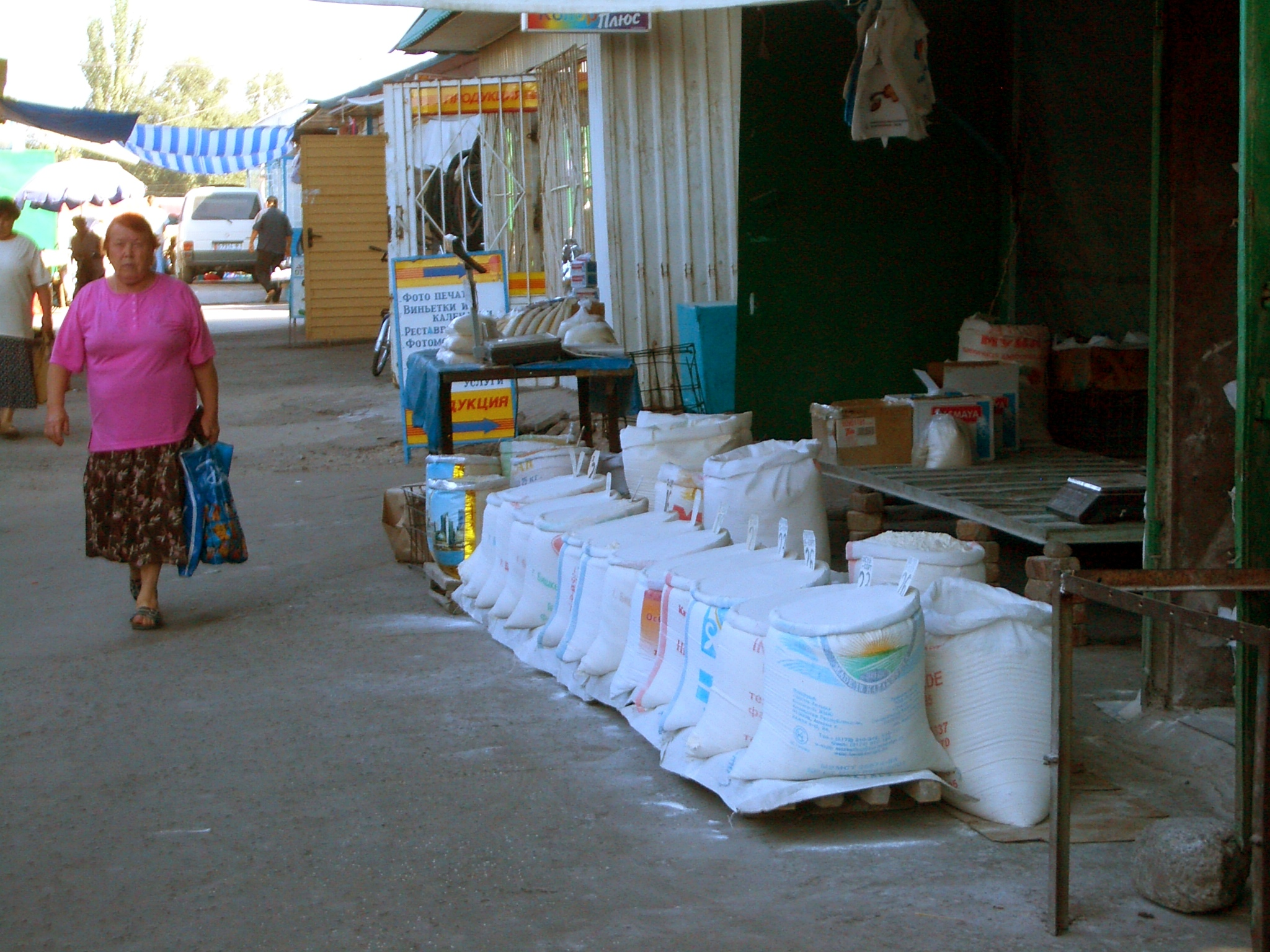
A variety of types of flour and cereals sold at a bazaar in Bishkek, Kyrgyzstan

- Rye flour is used to bake the traditional sourdough breads of Germany, Austria, Switzerland, Russia, Czech Republic, Poland and Scandinavia. Most rye breads use a mix of rye and wheat flours because rye does not produce sufficient gluten. Pumpernickel bread is usually made exclusively of rye, and contains a mixture of rye flour and rye meal. Secale flour is used to make bread such as Prądnik bread.
- Barley flour is a flour prepared from dried and ground barley. Barley flour is used to prepare barley bread and other breads, such as flat bread and yeast breads. It is used in the preparation of rieska, a traditional Finnish flat bread. Malted barley flour is flour made from barley seeds that have partially germinated and then were dried, and is used in malt products such as malted milk, malt loaf, and malt beer.

=== Gluten-free flours ===
When flours do not contain gluten, they are suitable for people with gluten-related disorders, such as coeliac disease, non-celiac gluten sensitivity or wheat allergy, among others. Contamination with gluten-containing cereals can occur during grain harvesting, transporting, milling, storing, processing, handling or cooking.

- Acorn flour is made from ground acorns and can be used as a substitute for wheat flour. It was used by Native Americans. Koreans also use acorn flour to make dotorimuk.
- Almond flour is made from ground almonds.
- Amaranth flour is produced from ground amaranth grain. It was commonly used in pre-Columbian Mesoamerican cuisine and was originally cultivated by the Aztecs. It is increasingly available in speciality food shops.
- Apple flour is made from milling apple pomace, the solid remains of juiced apples.
- Banana flour has been traditionally made of green bananas for thousands of years and is currently commonly used both as a gluten-free replacement for wheat flour and as a source of resistant starch.
- Bark flour can be made from the cambium layer or phloem of certain tree barks like pine and birch and can be used to make bark bread. In Finland, pine bark flour is known as pettujauho, and the bread made from it is called pettuleipä (pine bark bread).
- Bean flour is produced from pulverized dried or ripe beans. Garbanzo and fava bean flour is a flour mixture with a high nutritional value and strong aftertaste.
- Brown rice flour is of great importance in Southeast Asian cuisine. Edible rice paper can be made from it.
- Buckwheat flour is used as an ingredient in many pancakes in the United States. In Japan, it is used to make soba noodles. In Russia, buckwheat flour is added to the batter for pancakes called blinis, frequently eaten with caviar. Buckwheat flour is also used to make crêpes bretonnes in Brittany. On Hindu fasting days (Navaratri mainly, also Maha Shivaratri), people eat food made with buckwheat flour. The preparation varies across India. The best known of these dishes are kuttu ki puri and kuttu pakora. In most northern and western states the usual term is kuttu ka atta.
- Cassava flour is made from the root of the cassava plant. Tapioca flour is also produced from the root of the cassava plant and is used to make breads, pancakes, tapioca pudding, and fufu, an African savoury pudding, and is used as a starch.
- Chestnut flour is used in Corsica, the Périgord, and Lunigiana for breads, cakes and pastas. It is the original ingredient for polenta, and still used as such in Corsica and other Mediterranean locations. Chestnut bread keeps fresh for as long as two weeks. In other parts of Italy it is mainly used for desserts.
- Chickpea flour (also known as gram flour or besan) is of great importance in Indian cuisine and in Italy, where it is used for the Ligurian farinata.
- Chuño flour is made from dried potatoes in various countries of South America.
- Coconut flour is made from ground coconut meat and has the highest fiber content of any flour, having a very low concentration of digestible carbohydrates and thus making an excellent choice for those looking to restrict their carbohydrate intake. It also has a high fat content of about 60 percent.
- Finely ground maize, known as corn flour in the US, is popular in the Southern and Southwestern US, Mexico, Central America, and Punjab regions of India and Pakistan, where it is called makai ka atta. Coarse whole-grain corn flour is usually called cornmeal in the US. Finely ground corn flour that has been treated with food-grade lime is called masa harina (see masa) and is used to make tortillas and tamales in Mexican cooking. In Britain and most Commonwealth countries, "cornflour" is the term for what is known as corn starch in the US.
  - Cornmeal is very similar to corn flour (see above) except in a coarser grind.
  - Corn starch is starch extracted from the endosperm of the corn kernel.
- Glutinous rice flour or sticky rice flour is used in east and southeast Asian cuisines for making tangyuan, etc.
- Hemp flour is produced by pressing the oil from the hemp seed and milling the residue. Hemp seed is approximately 30 percent oil and 70 percent residue. Hemp flour does not rise, and is best mixed with other flours. Added to any flour by about 15–20 percent, it gives a spongy nutty texture and flavor with a green hue.
- Mesquite flour is made from the dried and ground pods of the mesquite tree, which grows throughout North America in arid climates. The flour has a sweet, slightly nutty flavor and can be used in a wide variety of applications.
- Nut flours are grated from oily nuts—most commonly almonds and hazelnuts—and are used instead of or in addition to wheat flour to produce more dry and flavorful pastries and cakes. Cakes made with nut flours are usually called tortes and most originated in Central Europe, in countries such as Hungary and Austria.
- Peasemeal or pea flour is a flour produced from roasted and pulverized yellow field peas.
- Peanut flour made from shelled cooked peanuts is a high-protein alternative to regular flour.
- Potato starch flour is obtained by grinding the tubers to a pulp and removing the fibre and protein by water-washing. Potato starch (flour) is very white starch powder used as a thickening agent. Standard (native) potato starch needs boiling, to thicken in water, giving a transparent gel. Because the flour is made from neither grains nor legumes, it is used as a substitute for wheat flour in cooking by Jews during Passover, when grains are not eaten.
- Potato flour, often confused with potato starch, is a peeled, cooked potato powder of mashed, mostly drum-dried and ground potato flakes using the whole potato and thus containing the protein and some of the fibres of the potato. It has an off-white slight yellowish color. These dehydrated, dried, potatoes, also called instant mashed potatoes can also be granules or flakes. Potato flour is cold-water-soluble; however, it is not used often as it tends to be heavy.
- Rice flour is ground kernels of rice. It is a staple in Asia. It is also widely used in Western countries, especially for people who suffer from gluten-related disorders. Brown rice flour has higher nutritional value than white rice flour.
- Sorghum flour is made from grinding whole grains of the sorghum plant. It is called jowar in India.
- Teff flour is made from the grain teff, and is of considerable importance in eastern Africa (particularly around the Horn of Africa). It is the chief ingredient in the bread injera, an important component of Ethiopian cuisine.
- Typha flour (also known as Cattail) can made from the rhizome of the Typha plant. The starch and protein roots are broken up under water before being dried and then ground down to create a flour.

==== More types ====
Flour also can be made from soybeans, arrowroot, taro, cattails, manioc, quinoa, and other non-cereal foodstuffs.

== Dangers ==
=== Flammability ===
Flour dust suspended in air is explosive—as is any mixture of a finely powdered flammable substance with air. Some devastating explosions have occurred at flour mills, including the Tradeston Flour Mills, in Glasgow, Scotland, which exploded in 1872 killing eighteen people, and an explosion in 1878 at the Washburn "A" Mill in Minneapolis that killed 22 people.

=== Pathogens ===
In the US, the Centers for Disease Control and Prevention has cautioned not to eat raw flour doughs or batters. Raw flour could contain harmful bacteria such as E. coli that were possibly in the ground when the cereal was growing. It is recommended that flour should be cooked like other foods to kill the bacteria. Similar advice has been issued by food standard agencies across the world.

== Fraud ==
During the industrial revolution, wheat and corn flour fraud became more common as it was mixed with chalk or gypsum dust.

== Products ==
Bread, pasta, crackers, cakes, and several other foods are made using flour. Wheat or corn flour is also used to make a roux as a base for thickening gravy and sauces. It can also be used as an ingredient in papier-mâché glue.

Cornstarch is a principal ingredient used to thicken many puddings or desserts, and is the main ingredient in packaged custard.

== See also ==
- Groat (grain)
- Ultra-processed food
- Panjiri

== Sources ==
- "The Bread and Flour Regulations 1998, United Kingdom". opsi.gov.uk. Archived from the original on February 21, 2006.
- This article incorporates text from a publication now in the public domain: Ward, Artemas (1911). "The Grocer's Encyclopedia". The Grocer's Encyclopedia.
