= Cider mill =

Equipment used for making apple cider

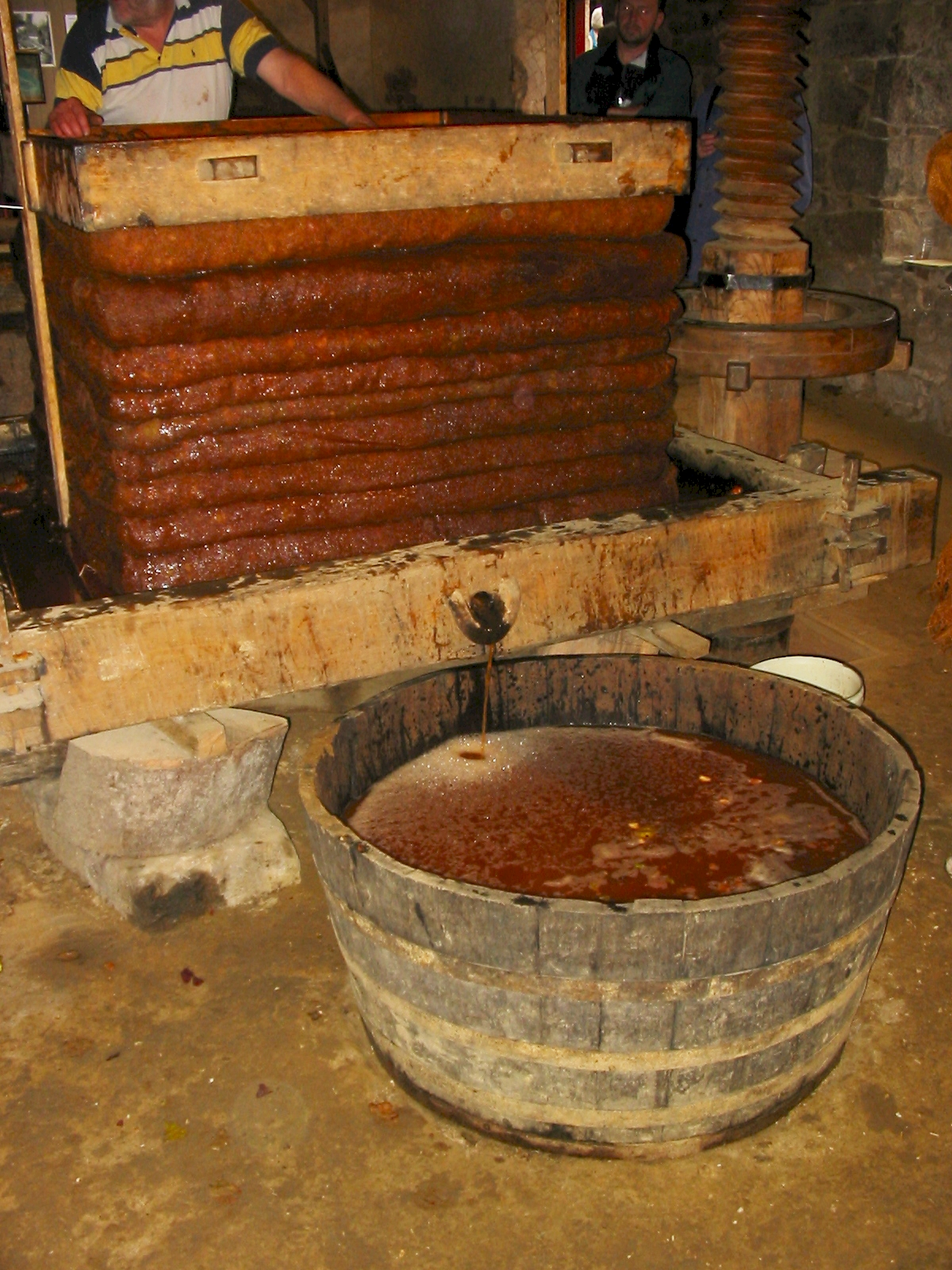
A large cider press at a cider mill in Jersey, used for squeezing the juice from crushed apples

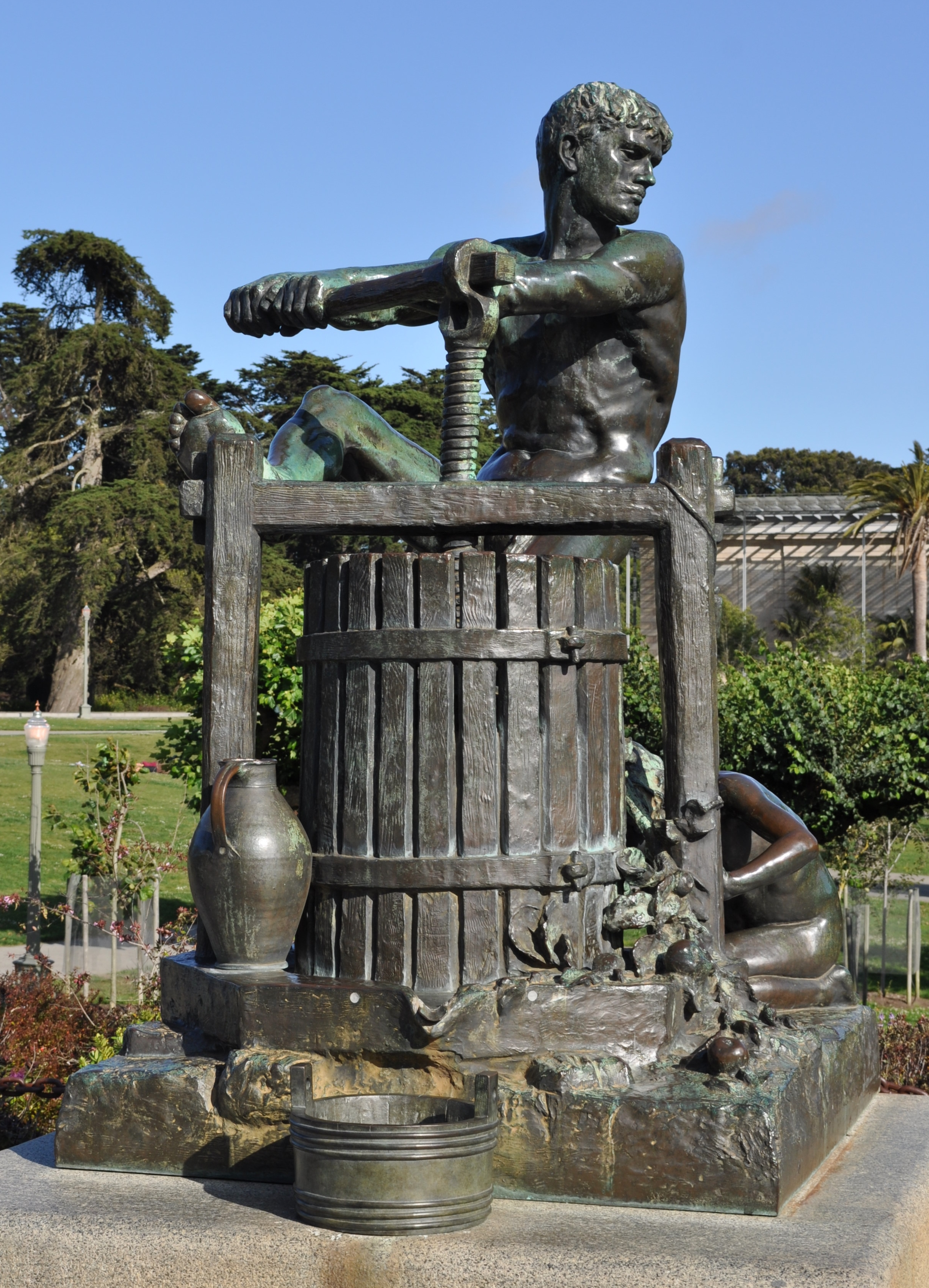
Apple Press Monument (a relic of the Mid-Winter Fair, 1894, still in its original location), Music Concourse, Golden Gate Park, San Francisco, California, USA

A cider mill, also known as a cidery, is the location and equipment used to crush apples into apple juice for use in making apple cider, hard cider, applejack, apple wine, pectin and other products derived from apples. More specifically, it refers to a device used to crush or grind apples as part of the overall juice production.

The mills used to manufacture, ferment, store, and ship juice products are usually located near apple orchards. Historically, the types of structure and machinery have varied greatly—including horse powered, water driven, and machine operated mills. The presses can be fixed or portable.

Cider mills were subject to legal proceedings in New York state in the 1800s over whether they were "fixed to freeholds" and other cases addressing legal designation as to what kind of property a cider mill is.

== Use ==
Cider-making takes place in numerous countries and regions. As with the cider itself, the various techniques used in milling and pressing the apples vary with each cider-making tradition. In most traditions, cider milling traditionally takes place in two stages: first, milling or grinding the apples into a pulpy mass called pulp, and a second stage, pressing the pulp to release the juice or "must". The remaining solids after juice extraction is "pomace" or "pommage".

Some mills provide custom pressing of a farmer's apples. In this way, apple varieties can be blended to make a cider of mixed juice types, for instance, a combination of sweet and aromatic juices. Various types of apple are recommended for making cider. Alcoholic cider can also be produced and is known as hard cider or applejack. Cider is stored and fermented in wooden barrels, carboys, stainless tanks, or glass jugs.

In 19th-century New England, apple farmers paid a mill owner a fee to crush apples into juice. A typical cider mill would look like many other small barns and sheds, with a set of large doors in the center of the longer side. Most cider mills were 20–30′ long by 20–25′ in width. At Old Sturbridge Village in Massachusetts, 19th-century cider mill equipment is still used to make cider. In The Marble Faun, author Nathaniel Hawthorne contrasted the wine-making in Italy with the cider-making process of "New England vintages, where the big piles of golden and rosy apples lie under the orchard trees, in the mild, autumnal sunshine; and the creaking cider-mill, set in motion by a circumgyratory horse, is all a-gush with the luscious juice."

== Operation ==
=== Milling ===
Milling, grinding, or crushing can take various forms, depending on the quantity of apples to be crushed and the motive power available.

The earliest and most basic form of cider mill consists of little more than an enclosed area where apples are pounded by large wooden pestles.

In England, Jersey, and northern France, the traditional form was a "horse-mill" or "stone mill". A horse-mill consists of a circular trough made of stone, in which is set either one or two large stone wheels called "runners". At the center is a pivot point or "nut". A horse is harnessed to the outside of the wheel, and driven in a circle, slowly grinding the apples to a pulpy mass called pommage. Through the early 19th century, this was the dominant form in England. By the early 20th century in Britain, however, the stone mills had largely fallen out of fashion, increasingly replaced by the roller mills, though they continued to be the primary form in France. Though the stone mill had been introduced to and used by the American Colonists, its usage was not well recorded, and by the end of the 19th century it was essentially unknown in the United States.

In Germany, apples were traditionally grated by hand rather than crushed.

A later innovation was the toothed roller-mill. These mills use toothed cylinders made of stone or metal to grind the apples into pomace. Such mills are portable, and produce a pomace that is finer than that of the large horse-mills. It was first introduced to England in 1689 by agriculturalist John Worlidge, who adapted it from the sugar-cane crushers used in the West Indies. Yet as of the beginning of the 19th-century, such mills could not handle the same quantity in bulk as the horse-driven mills.

Basic methods of cider-milling

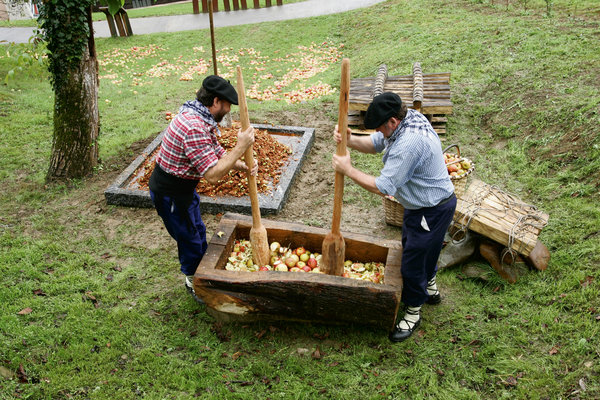
Pounding: Pounding apples in the Basque Country

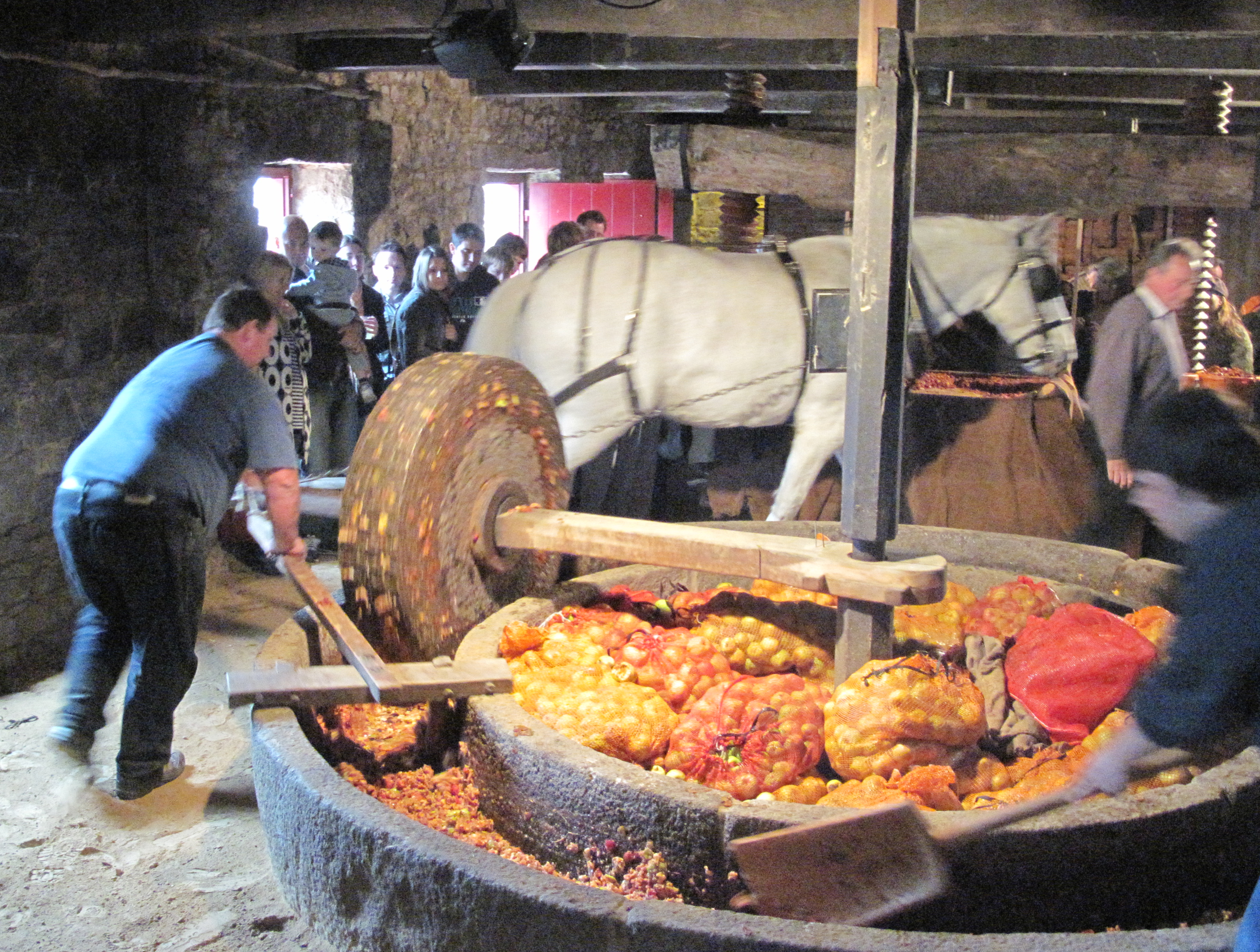
Horse-driven stone mill: At the Faîs'sie d'Cidre 2009, Jersey

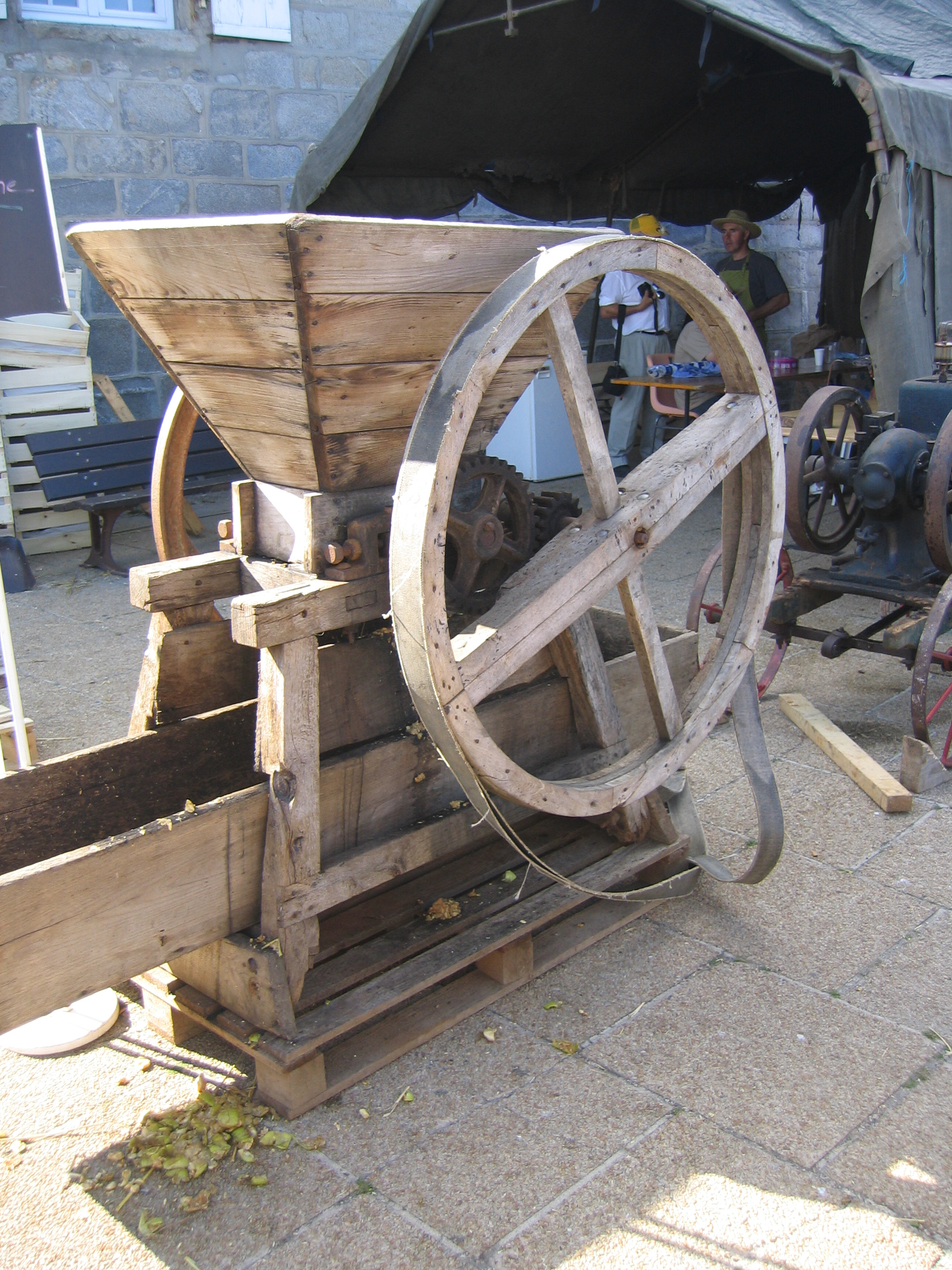
Roller mill: a roller-mill machine in France

=== Pressing ===
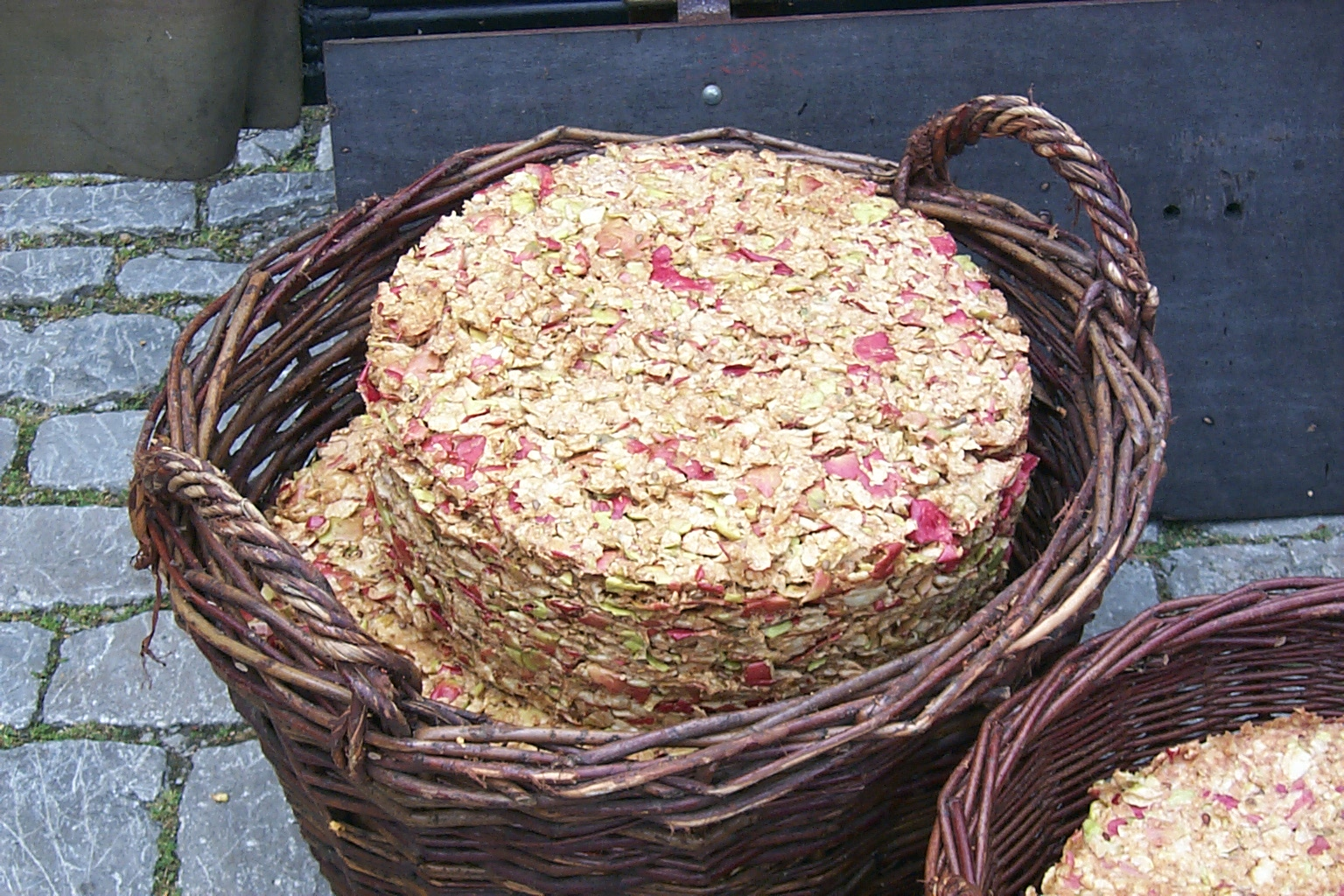
Apple pressings

After the apples have been ground into pomace, the pomace must be squeezed to extract the juice. This is done in a device called a cider press, which like the cider mill, takes various forms.

One form is a large horse-operated lever press or screw press. This method was common in Britain, Jersey, and northern France, as well as the United States. This form involves either of two methods to hold the loose pomace in place as it is pressed. The first is to use alternating layers of straw and pomace, creating a mixture known as "cheese". The other is to wrap the pomace in cloth. The German tradition used smaller, hand-operated lever presses in the same manner.

An alternate form is the "hand press" (sometimes called a "Continental Press" in England), a small screw-press operated by hand. These presses dispense with the various methods of covering the pomace, and instead use a container made of wooden staves.

By the turn of the 20th century, hydraulic presses had begun to be introduced.

Basic methods of cider-pressing

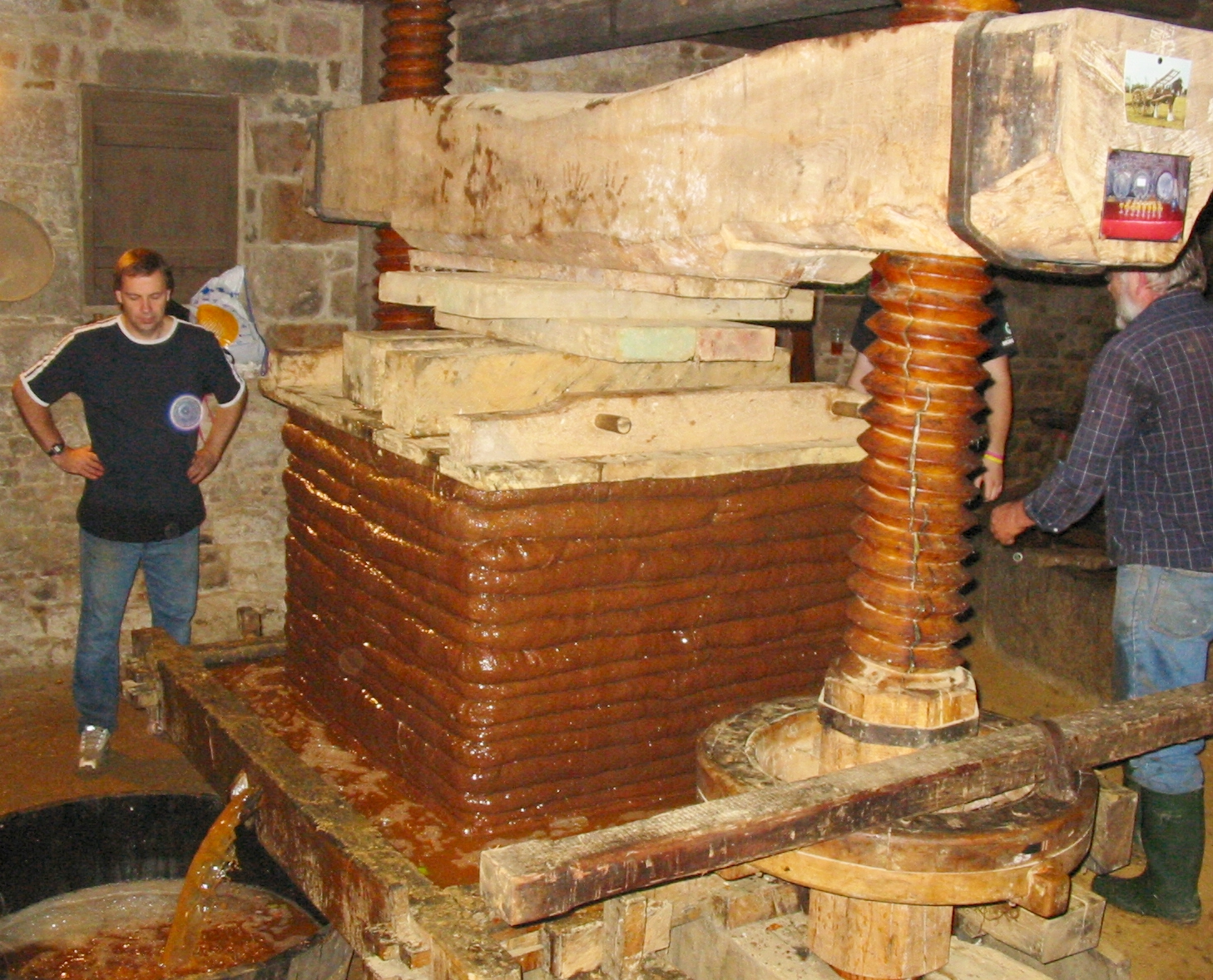
Lever press: Cider pressing at the Faîs'sie d'Cidre in Jersey

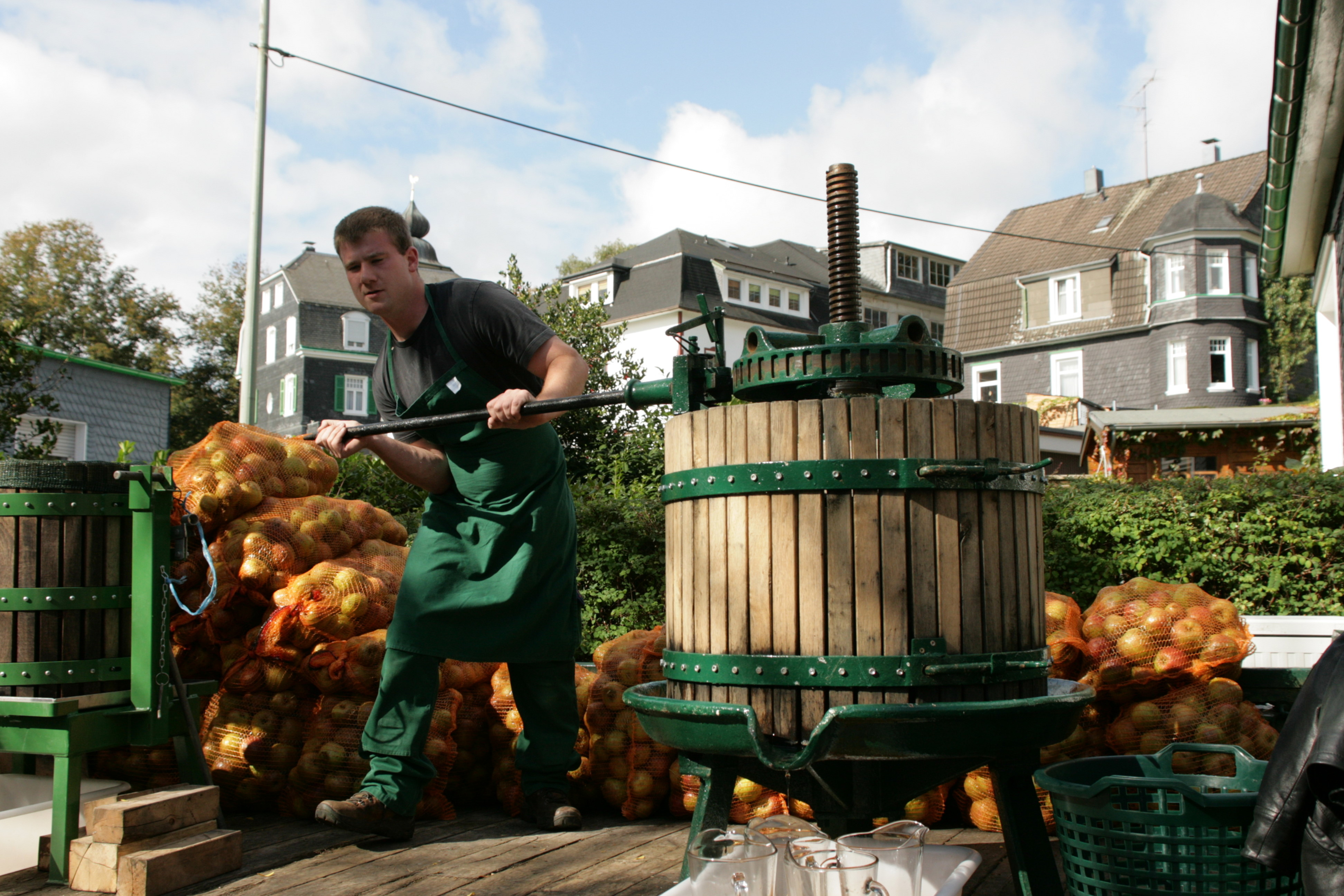
Hand-press: Pressing at the Bauernmarkt, Lüttringhausen, Germany

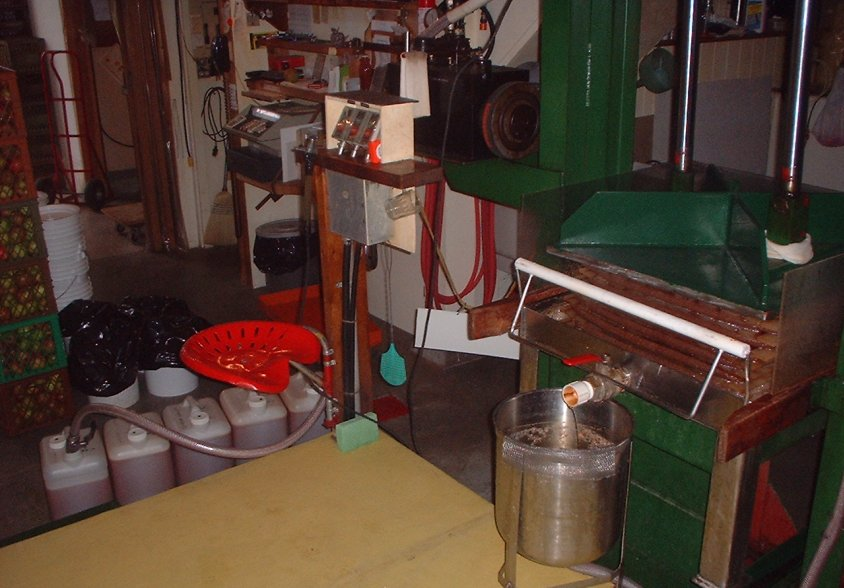
Hydraulic press: A modern hydraulic press

After the juices had been extracted, the leftover pressings are variously known as pomace, "math", "cake", "powz", "mure" or "pommage". It might either be watered and pressed again to produce a weak cider known as ciderkin, or when still fresh, used as animal feed.

== See also ==
- Cider house
