= Piquette =

Vinous wine produced by adding water to grape pomace

Piquette is a French wine term which commonly refers to a vinous beverage produced by adding water to grape pomace but sometimes refers to a very simple wine or a wine substitute.

== From pomace ==
If water is added to the pomace remaining after grapes intended for wine production have been pressed, it is possible to produce a thin, somewhat wine-like beverage.

The ancient Greeks and Romans used pomace in this way under the name lora, and the product was used for slaves and common workers. After the wine grapes were pressed twice, the pomace was soaked in water for a day and pressed for a third time. The resulting liquid was mixed with more water to produce a thin, tepid "wine" that was not very appealing.

The production of piquette by poor farmers, or for consumption by farmhands and workers continued during the centuries, and is known to have been in practice as late as the mid-20th century. However, piquette seems to have been primarily associated with poor conditions, where real wine could not be afforded.

=== EU regulations ===
The European Union wine regulations define piquette as the product obtained by the fermentation of untreated grape pomace macerated in water, or by leaching fermented grape pomace with water. In cases where an EU member state allows the production of piquette, it may only be used for distillation or for consumption in the families of individual wine-growers. It may not be sold.

== Produced by other methods ==
During the Great French Wine Blight in the late 19th century, the production of wine fell so dramatically in France that several types of "Ersatz wine" were frequently produced in France under the designation piquette, and not just consumed locally, but also sold. Some of it was coloured and flavoured to appear as real wine, or was blended into actual wine to increase the amount available.

A common way to produce such piquettes was to mix raisins with water. The raisins used were imported to France from Mediterranean countries, and were produced from grape varieties not directly suitable for wine production.

== French piquette ==
The term "piquette" has also been used as a nickname for French wine of low quality. Piquette came to be used in this fashion because it is derived from the word piquer, which means to prick or prickle. These wines often had a slight fizz which would prickle the mouth.

Piquette was produced in what was then Paris's outskirts, in Belleville and Montmartre, in an era when the simpler wines for Paris were sourced as close to the capital as possible in order to lower transportation costs.

Wines considered to be simple or bad quality are still sometimes referred to as "piquette" in French.
