= Olive mill pomace =

Olive mill pomace or two-phase olive mill waste (TPOMW) is a by-product from the olive oil mill extraction process. Usually it is used as fuel in a cogeneration system or as organic fertiliser after a composting operation.

Olive mill pomace compost is made by a controlled biologic process that transforms organic waste into a stable humus. Adding composted olive mill pomace as organic fertiliser in olive orchards allows the soil to get nutrients back after each olive crop.

== Two-phase pomace ==
In crude olive oil production, the traditional system, i.e. pressing, and the three-phase system produce a press cake and a considerable amount of olive mill waste water while the two-phase system, which is mainly used in Spain, produces a paste-like waste called "alperujo" or "two-phase pomace" that has a higher water content and is more difficult to treat than traditional solid waste. The water content of the press cake, composed of crude olive cake, pomace and husk, is about 30 percent if it is produced by traditional pressing technology and about 45–50 percent using decanter centrifuges. The press cake still has some oil that is normally recovered in a separate installation. The exhausted olive cake is incinerated or used as a soil conditioner in olive groves.
