= Ciderkin =

Ciderkin, sometimes referred to as water-cider, is a kind of weak alcoholic cider traditionally drunk by children, and made by steeping the refuse apple pomace in water. Ciderkin is currently listed alongside Cheate bread and Butter on the "Bill of Fare" for the Plimoth Plantation 1627 Harvest Dinner with the Pilgrims. However, according to the Plimoth Plantation Food Historian, this is not true 17th century ciderkin; Plimoth uses the term to differentiate between modern pasteurized sweet cider, which is served to guests, and period hard cider. Stagecoach and Tavern Days, written by Alice Morse Earle, describes a 16th-century New Hampshire settler proudly recounting "he made one barrel of cider, one barrel of water-cider, and one barrel of charming good drink" from his first apple crop of eight bushels. According to Earle:

Water-cider, or ciderkin, was a very weak, slightly cidery beverage, which was made by pouring water over the solid dregs left after the cider had been pressed from the pomace, and pressing it...sometimes a little molasses and ginger was added.

In Berkshire Stories, by Morgan Bulkeley, ciderkin "was deemed especially suitable for children", especially compared to the stronger ciders widely consumed during the American colonial period.
