= Maize flour =

Flour ground from dried corn

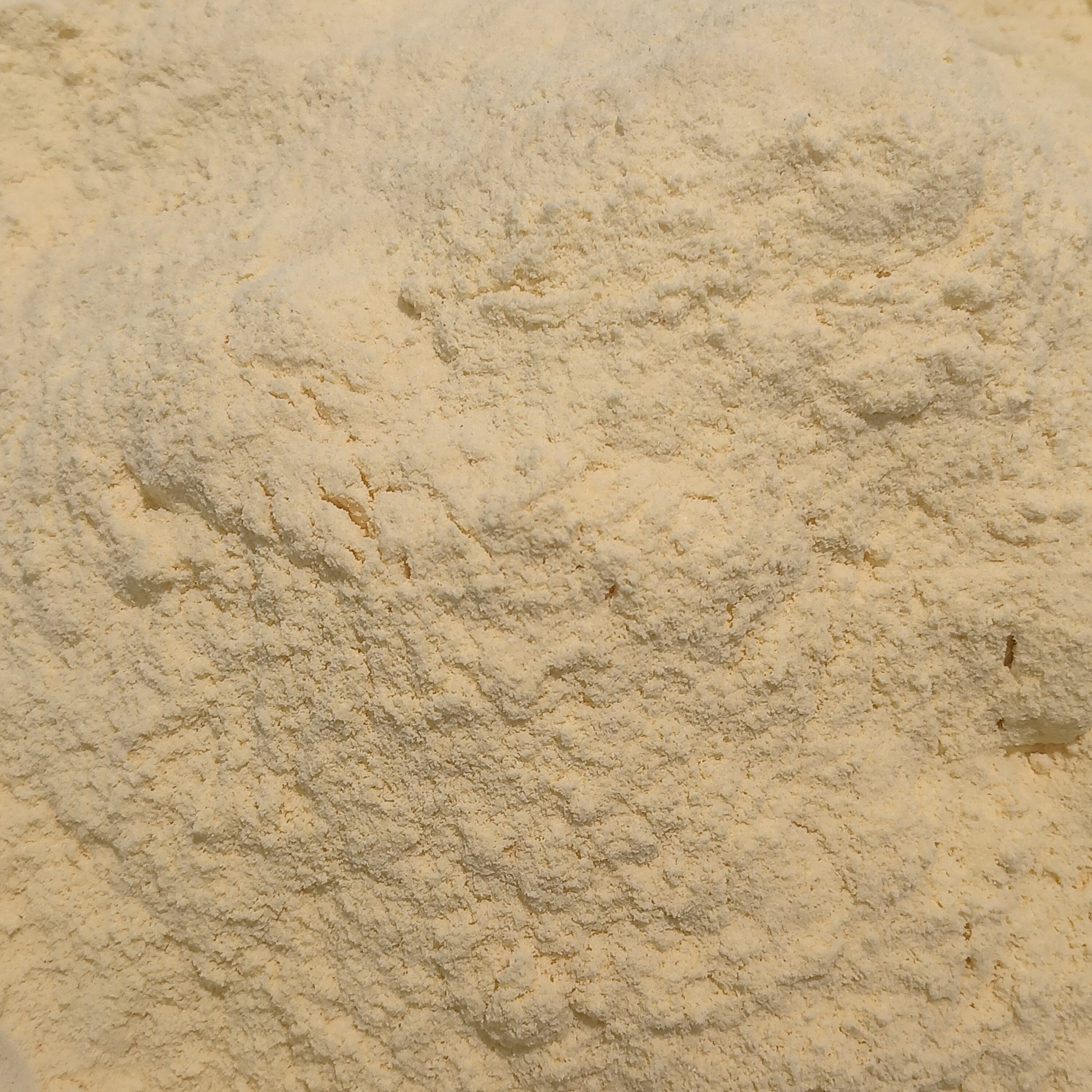
- Alternative names: Corn flour
- Main ingredients: Maize

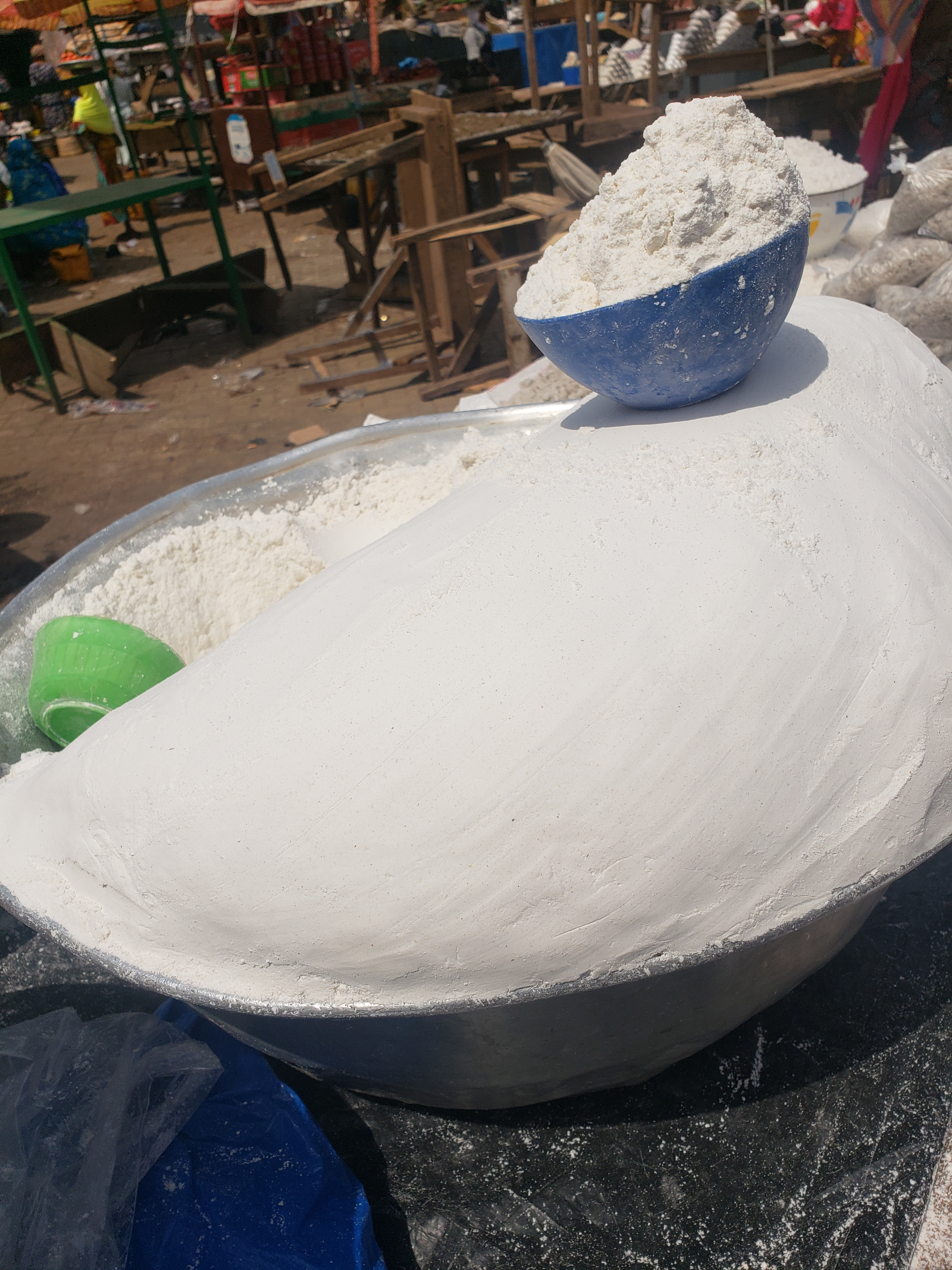
White maize flour

Maize flour or corn flour is a flour ground from dried maize (corn). It is a common staple food, and is ground to coarse, medium, and fine consistencies. Coarsely ground corn flour (meal) is known as cornmeal. When maize flour is made from maize that has been soaked in an alkaline solution, e.g., limewater (a process known as nixtamalization), it is called masa harina (or masa flour), which is used for making tamales and tortillas. Arepas are typically made from corn flour that has not been nixtamalized.

== See also ==
- Semolina
- List of maize dishes
