= Pomace =

Solid remains of fruit after pressing

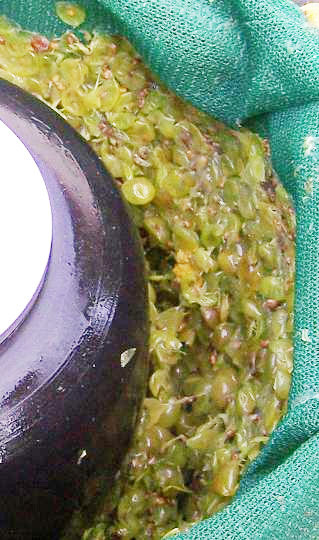
Pomace in a bladder press. These are Chardonnay grapes left over after pressing.

Pomace, pumace (/ˈpʌməs/, PUM-əs) or marc (/ˈmɑːrk/; from French marc [maʁ]) is the solid remains of grapes, olives, or other fruit after pressing for juice or oil. It contains the skins, pulp, seeds, and stems of the fruit.

Grape pomace has traditionally been used to produce pomace brandy (such as grappa, orujo, törkölypálinka, tsipouro, tsikoudia, zivania). Today, it is mostly used as fodder, as fertilizer, or for the extraction of bioactive compounds like polyphenols.

== Name ==
The English word pomace derives from Medieval Latin pomaceum ("cider") and pomaceus ("pomaceous, appley"), from Classical Latin pomum ("fruit, apple"). The word was originally used for cider and only later applied to the apple mash before or after pressing, via various cognate terms in northern French dialects, before being used for such byproducts more generally.

== History ==
The ancient Greeks and Romans used grape pomace to create an inferior class of wine given to slaves and laborers. The grapes were first pressed twice and the resulting pomace was then soaked in water for another day and pressed a third time and fermented. The resulting liquid produced a thin, weak, and thirst-quenching wine with an alcohol content around 3 or 4%, now known as piquette in English and French and as graspia or vin piccolo in Italian. Piquette was also widely available during the Middle Ages. As medieval wines were not usually fermented to dryness, medieval piquette retained a degree of residual sugar.

Pomace from various sources—particularly fish and castor beans—was also used in the early modern period for fertilizer.

=== Olive pomace ===
Olive pomace, the byproduct of olive oil extraction, was widely used throughout classical antiquity as an alternative fuel source to wood and charcoal. Use of olive pomace peaked in the Roman era, when, due to urban growth and proto-industrial activity, markets for imported olive pomace developed. Olive pomace may be sun-dried or made into charcoal for use as fuel.

== Uses ==
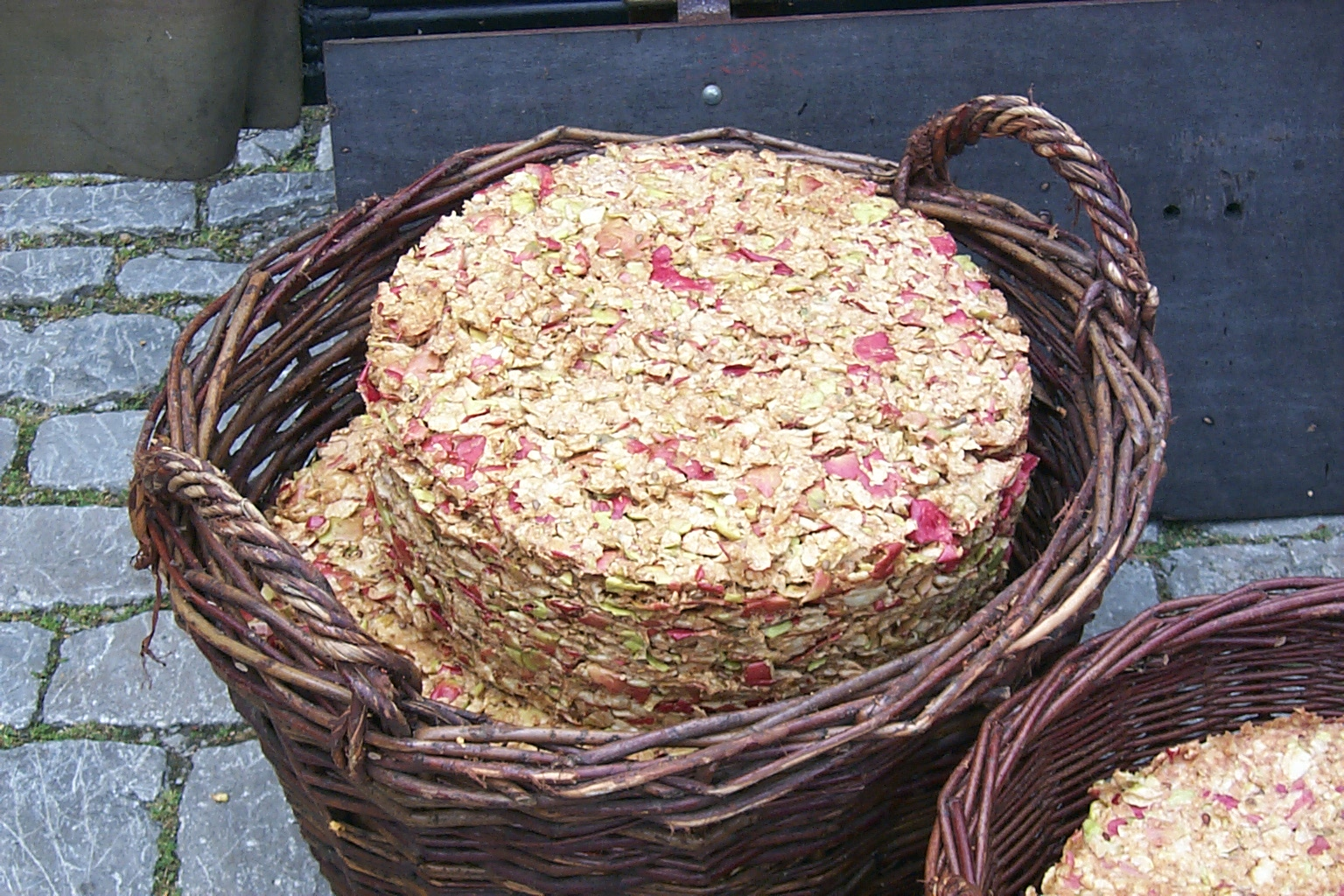
The remains of apples left over after pressing cider

Apple pomace is often used to produce pectin and can be used to make ciderkin, a weak cider, as well as white cider, a strong and colourless alcoholic drink.

=== Distilling ===
Grape pomace is used to produce pomace brandy and piquette. Most wine-producing cultures began making some type of pomace brandy after the principles of distillation were understood.

=== Winemaking ===
Pomace in winemaking differs, depending upon whether white wine or red wine is being produced.

In red wine production, pomace is produced after the free run juice (the juice created before pressing by the weight of gravity) is poured off, leaving behind dark blackish-red pomace consisting of grape skins and stems. The color of red wine is derived from skin contact during the maceration period, which sometimes includes partial fermentation. The resulting pomace is more alcoholic and tannic than pomace produced from white wine production. Pomace from the Italian wine Amarone is macerated in Valpolicella wine to produce Ripasso.

In white wine production, grapes are separated from their skins, then pressed to obtain juice. The skin pomace is a pale, greenish-brown color, and contains residual sugars and tannins. This pomace is used in brandy production.

=== Other uses ===
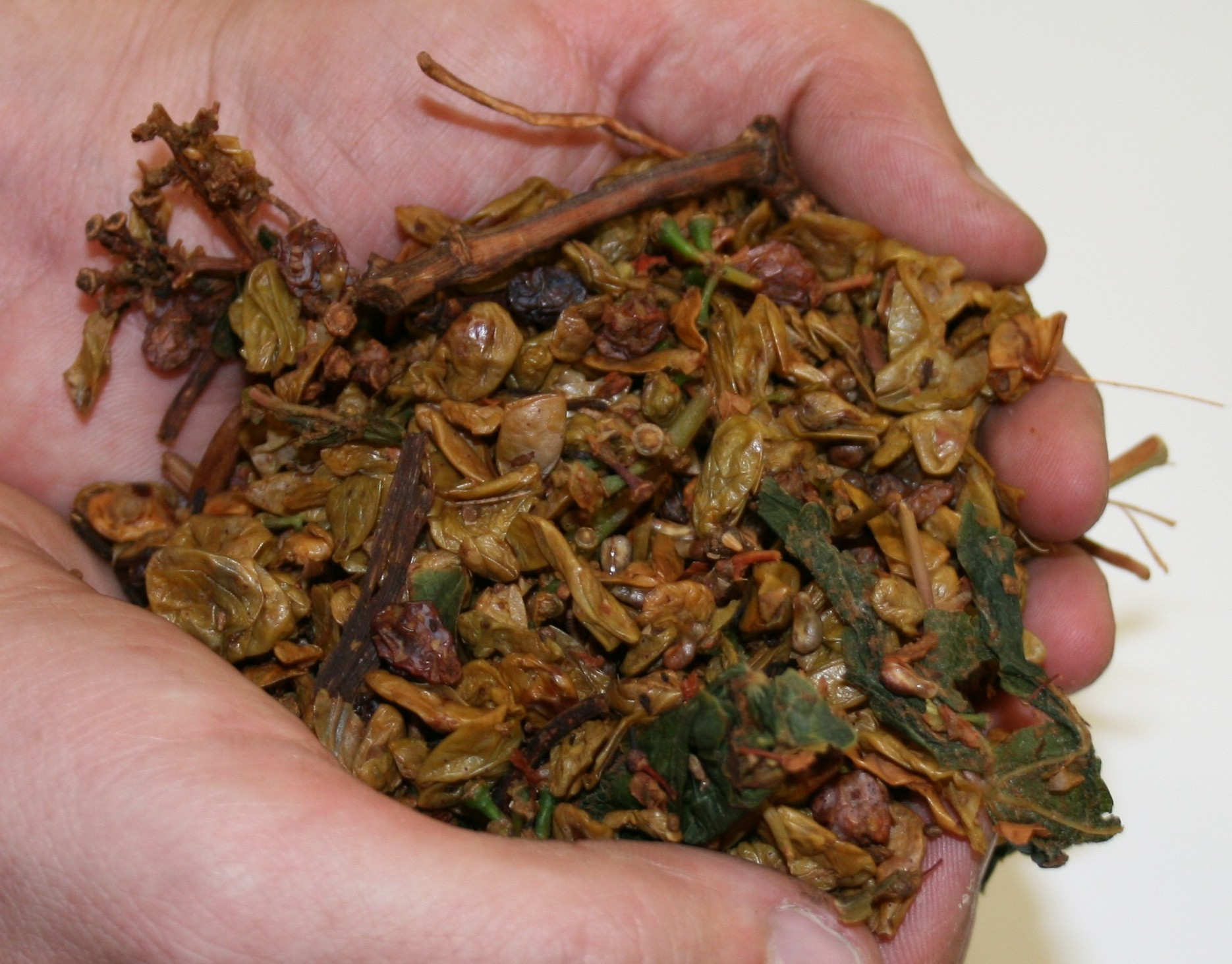

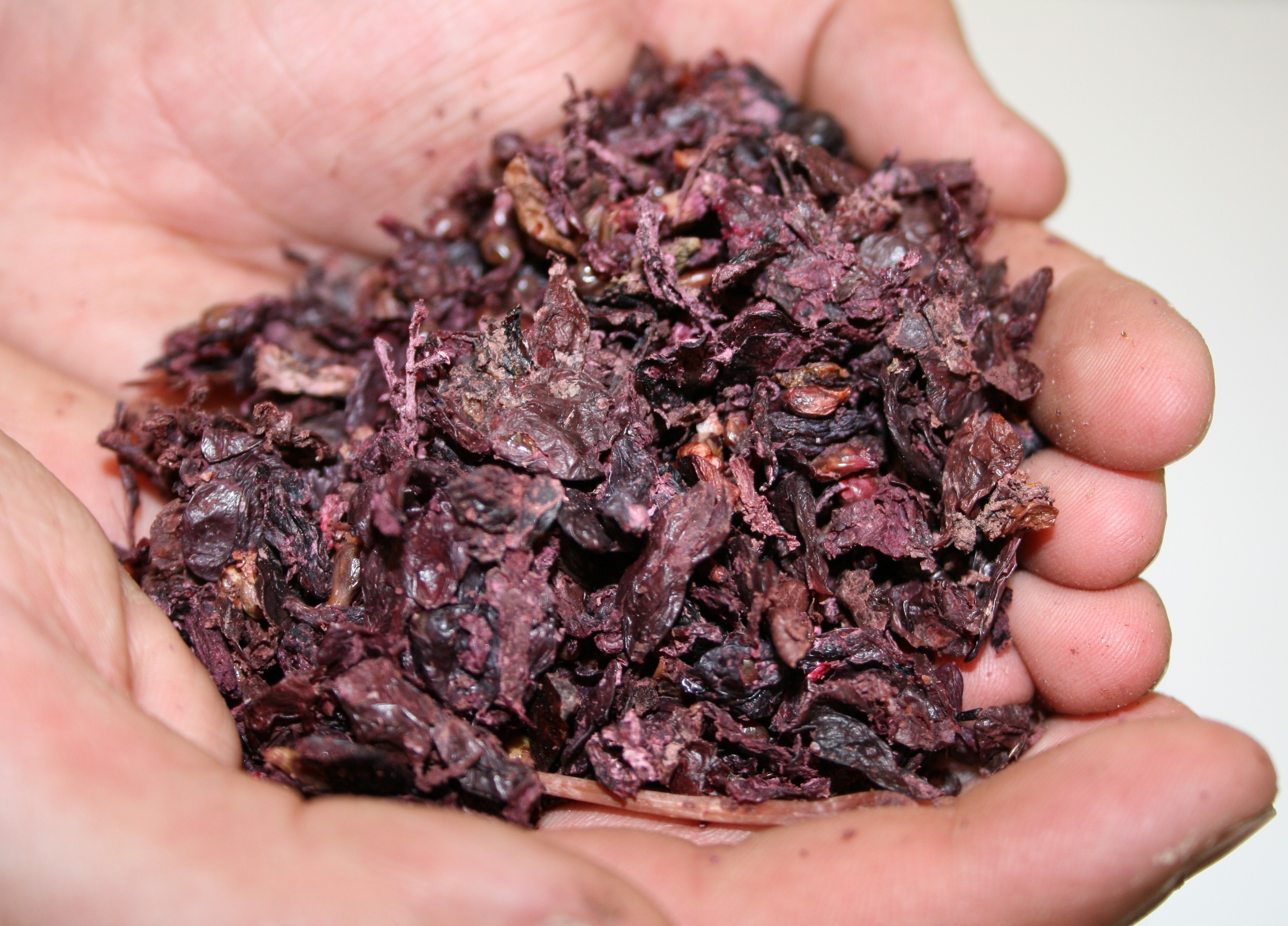
Grape pomace from wineries in the Barossa Valley, South Australia. Top, white grape pomace; bottom, red grape pomace.

Pomace is produced in large quantities in wine production, making its disposal an important environmental consideration. Some wineries use the material as fertilizer, while others are selling it to biogas companies for renewable energy. As envisioned, pomace would be introduced into anaerobic digesters that contain microorganisms that aid in its decomposition and produce methane gas that could be burnt to generate power.

Grape pomace is also used in the oil and gas industry as a lost circulation material in oil-based drilling muds due to the pomace being fibrous and tannin-rich.

Oenocyanin, a natural red dye and food-coloring agent, is produced from grape pomace. Tartrates (potassium bitartrate, 'cream of tartar') and grape polyphenols can also be manufactured from grape pomace.

Apple pomace has long been a traditional feed for various kinds of livestock. The use of grape pomace as livestock feed is encouraged in order to reduce the release of grape processing residues in the environment, which can lead to serious pollution. Apple pomace can also be milled in order to create apple flour, also known as apple pomace flour.

Grape and apple pomace have been used to make plant-based leather.

== Legal regulations ==
=== Canada ===
According to the Canadian Food and Drug Regulations, pomace can be a potable alcoholic distillate or a mixture of potable alcoholic distillates obtained by distilled skin and pulp of sound ripe fruit after removal of the fruit juice, wine or fruit wine. Pomace may contain caramel, fruit, botanical substances, flavoring and flavoring preparations. Pomace may be described on its label as "(name of the fruit) Pomace" or "(name of the fruit) Marc" if all of the skin and pulp of the fruit used to make the pomace originate from the particular fruit.

== See also ==
- Acqua pazza
- Olive mill pomace
- Olive pomace oil
- Piquette
