= Peasemeal =

Meal (flour) from field peas

Dry Pea Flour
Nutritional value per 100 g (3.5 oz)
- Energy: 365.0 kcal (1,527 kJ)
- Carbohydrates: 65.0 g
- Sugars: 8.0 g
- Dietary fiber: 25.5 g
- Fat: 2.2 g
- Saturated: 0.0 g
- Trans: 0.0 g
- Protein: 23.5 g
Vitamins and minerals
Vitamins	Quantity %DV^{†}
Vitamin A	149.0 IU
Thiamine (B1)	58% 0.7 mg
Riboflavin (B2)	15% 0.2 mg
Niacin (B3)	18% 2.9 mg
Vitamin B6	12% 0.2 mg
Folate (B9)	69% 274.0 μg
Vitamin C	2% 1.8 mg
Minerals	Quantity %DV^{†}
Calcium	4% 55.0 mg
Iron	24% 4.4 mg
Potassium	33% 981.0 mg
Sodium	1% 15.0 mg
Zinc	27% 3.0 mg
- Other constituents: Quantity
- Cholesterol: 0.0 g
- ^{†}Percentages estimated using US recommendations for adults, except for potassium, which is estimated based on expert recommendation from the National Academies.

Peasemeal (also called pea flour) is a flour produced from yellow field peas that have been roasted. The roasting enables greater access to protein and starch, thus increasing nutritive value. Traditionally the peas would be ground three times using water-powered stone mills. The color of the flour is brownish yellow due to the caramelization achieved during roasting, while the texture ranges from fine to gritty. The uses of peasemeal are similar to maize meal in baking, porridge and quick breads. Peasemeal has had a long history in Great Britain and is still used in Scotland for dishes such as brose and bannocks. Brose is similar to farina in its consumption by the addition of boiling water or stock to the peasemeal then eaten immediately with butter, pepper, salt, sugar or raisins.

The production of peasemeal disappeared in the 1970s until Fergus Morrison took over a run-down water-powered mill in Golspie, Scotland and revived the mill and peasemeal due to popular demand.

Currently, the use of yellow pea flour is again gaining momentum due to the nutritional benefits and sustainability associated to this food crop. Pea flour can fully or partly replace wheat flour in bakery products, such as cakes, cookies and bread.
