= Peanut flour =

Foodstuff

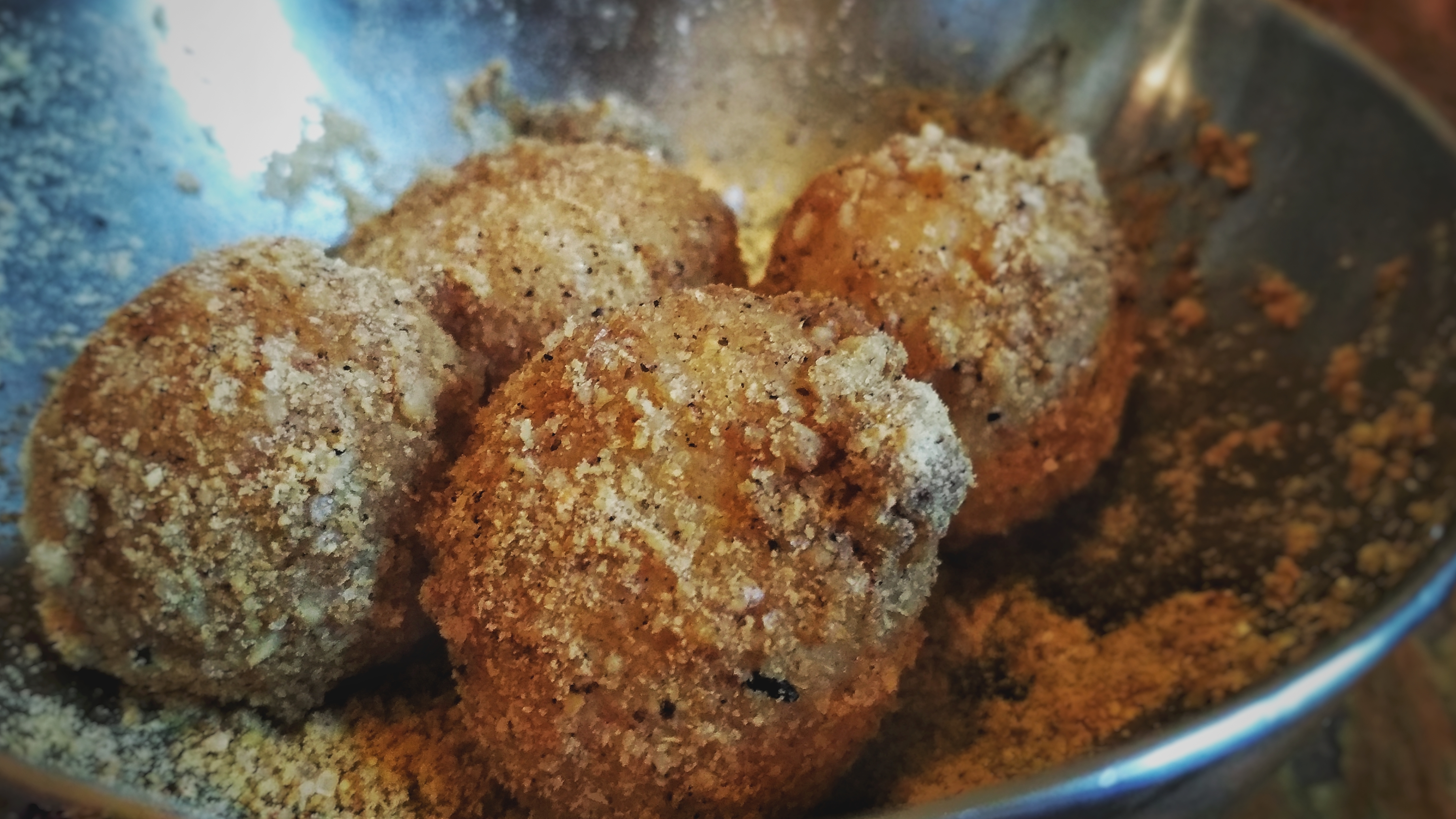
- Si with peanut flour
- Type: Flour
- Main ingredients: Peanuts
- Variations: Light roast/dark roast
Nutritional value
(per 100 g serving)
- Protein: 52.2 g
- Fat: 0.5 g
- Carbohydrate: 34.7 g

Peanut flour is made from crushed, fully or partly defatted peanuts. Peanut flour, depending on the quantity of fat removed, is highly protein-dense, providing up to 52.2 grams (1.84 oz) per 100 grams (3.5 oz). Culinary professionals use peanut flour as a thickener for soups and as a flavor and aromatic enhancer in breads, pastries, and main dishes.

== Types ==
Light roast: Light roast 12% fat is lightest in roast, aroma and in flavor of all of the peanut flours offered. It is used in applications where the peanut flour is not needed for flavor. Light roast with 28% fat provides a light flavor and aroma to dishes. It is used in culinary dishes where only a subtle flavor is needed.

Dark roast: The dark roast peanut flours provide a robust peanut taste and aroma. Both roasts are used when a strong peanut flour is wanted in the culinary dish. The dark roast 12% fat is less in flavor than the 28% fat.

== Powdered peanut butter ==
Peanut flour can be mixed with sugar and salt to create a powdered version of peanut butter. Since peanut flour has had most of its oil removed, peanut butter reconstituted from this powder can have up to 88% less fat than traditional peanut butter.

Powdered peanut butter can be used in baking, cooking and desserts.

== Nutritional value ==
Defatted peanut flour is very low in fat, saturated fat and cholesterol. It is also a good source of dietary fiber, thiamin, folate, potassium and zinc, and a very good source of protein, niacin, magnesium, phosphorus, copper and manganese. Note that as a processed food, the following values vary significantly depending on the exact product.

| Nutrient | Units | Amount per 100 g |
|---|---|---|
| Water | g | 7.8 |
| Energy | kJ | 1369 |
| Protein | g | 52.2 |
| Total fat | g | 0.5 |
| Total carbohydrates | g | 34.7 |
| Fiber | g | 15.8 |
| Sugars | g | 8.2 |

== See also ==
- List of peanut dishes

== Sources ==
- Source: USDA National Nutrient Database for Standard Reference, Release 22 (2009)
