= Mulsum (drink) =

Wine mixed with honey

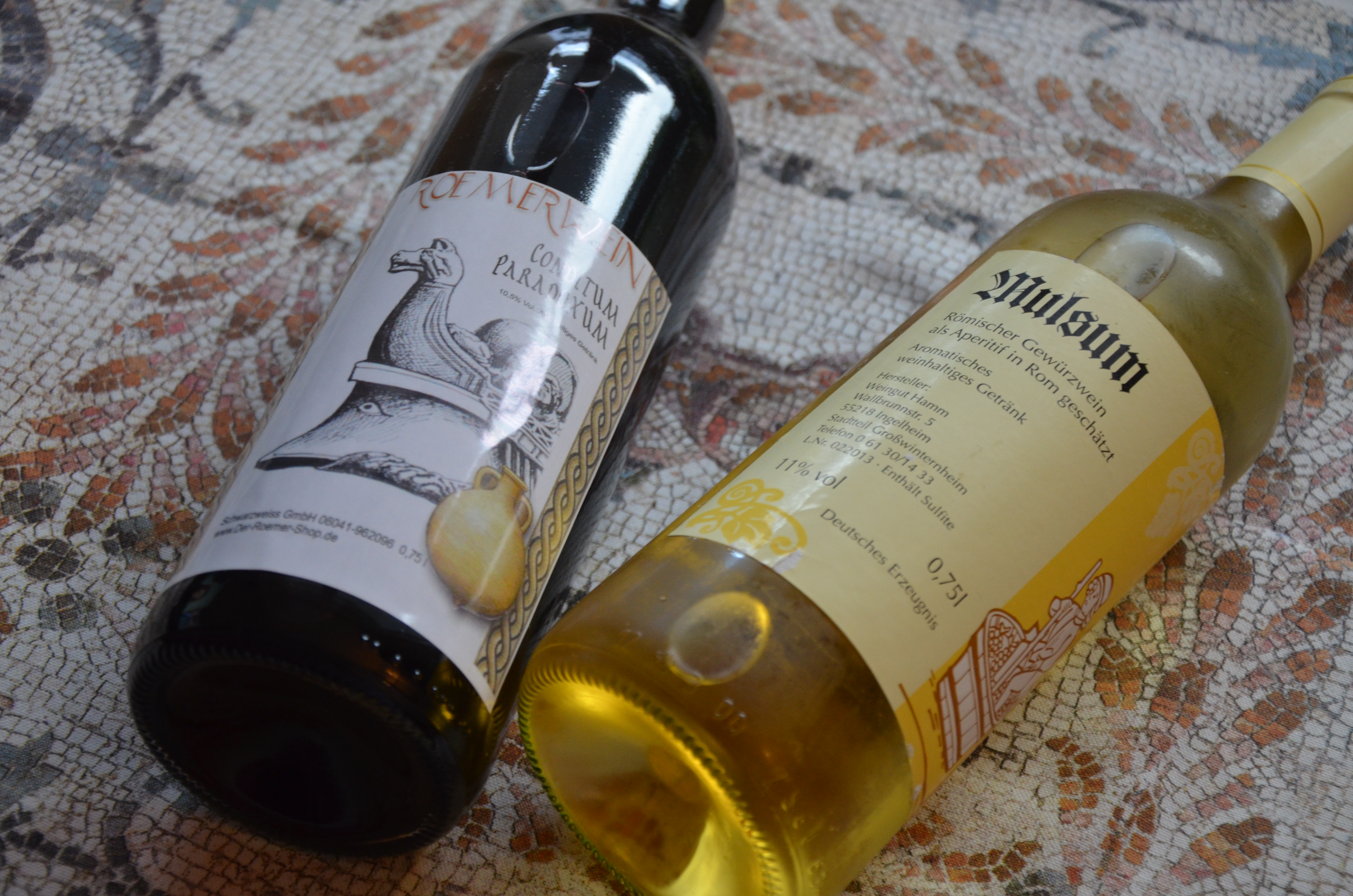
On the right side: A bottle of reconstituted mulsum

Mulsum was the ancient beverage used by Romans, with the two main ingredients being wine and honey. The beverage was usually served before the main meal and is therefore an aperitif.

== History ==
Mulsum was usually the drink offered at the beginning of the Roman dinner in conjunction with the "gustus", what we would call the course of appetizers. Also for mulsum there were different production methods and quality categories of the product. The best mulsum was obtained from the must resulting from the half-complete crushing of grapes coming from vines cultivated near trees and harvested in dry days. To 5-parts of must was added 1-part of honey; after careful shaking the mixture was put in a jar, which was closed and left to rest for at least one month in order to be filtered and put again to rest. A similar preparation is mentioned in the Greek Geoponica as oenomeli. Besides being used as a beverage, mulsum was also used as a "medicine", for example consumed against stomach pains.

== Composition ==
Some authors maintain that mulsum was elaborated with the first pressing of the grape to which honey was added, once the must was fermented (it sometimes appears under the denomination "wine and honey" in numerous references) in proportion of four parts of wine for one of honey. According to Columella the drink was made by adding 10 pounds of honey to a jar of must. The mixture was then kept for 30 days in a closed vessel and afterwards decanted and smoked. Pliny on the other hand, recommends old wine mixed with boiled honey in order to make mulsum.

== Uses ==
Mulsum is an alcoholic drink, with a sweet taste, very similar to mead (which is made by the fermentation of water and honey). It was customary, at the time, to offer this wine at the beginning of banquets. It is also known that, in spite of the presence of honey in its composition, mulsum was more affordable than pure honey, at the time of the Roman Empire.

== Celebrations ==
The Fair of Honey is celebrated in November, by the people of Llubí, Mallorca, the Balearic Islands, in Spain.

== See also ==
- Apicius
- Conditum
- Ancient Rome and wine
