= The Christian Martyrs' Last Prayer =

Painting by Jean-Léon Gérôme

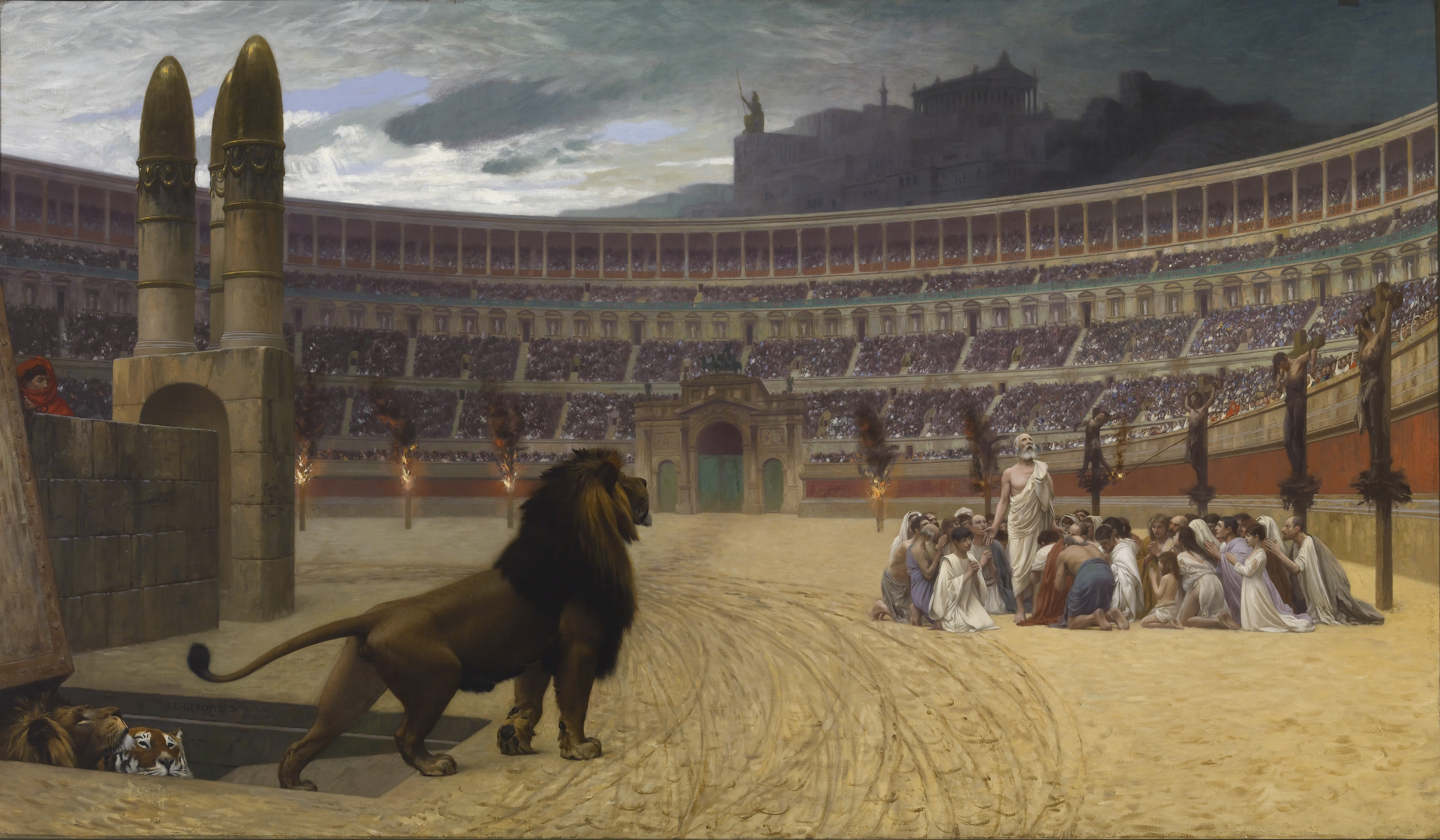
- Artist: Jean-Léon Gérôme
- Year: 1860–1883
- Medium: Oil on canvas
- Dimensions: 87.9 cm × 150.1 cm (34.6 in × 59.1 in)
- Location: Walters Art Museum

The Christian Martyrs' Last Prayer (French: La Dernière Prière des martyrs chrétiens), also known as The Christian Martyrs and The Last Prayer, is an 1883 painting by the French painter Jean-Léon Gérôme. It is part of the collection of the Walters Art Museum in Baltimore.

== Description ==
The amphitheatre is filled to overflowing with the crowd that has gathered to witness the martyrdom of the Christians. Around the vast circle, unhappy victims agonize upon the cross. In one corner of the arena, a group of men and women, condemned to die, confess their new faith in an ardent prayer, while from the opened subterraneous passage the ravenous beasts are advancing upon their human prey.

== Context ==
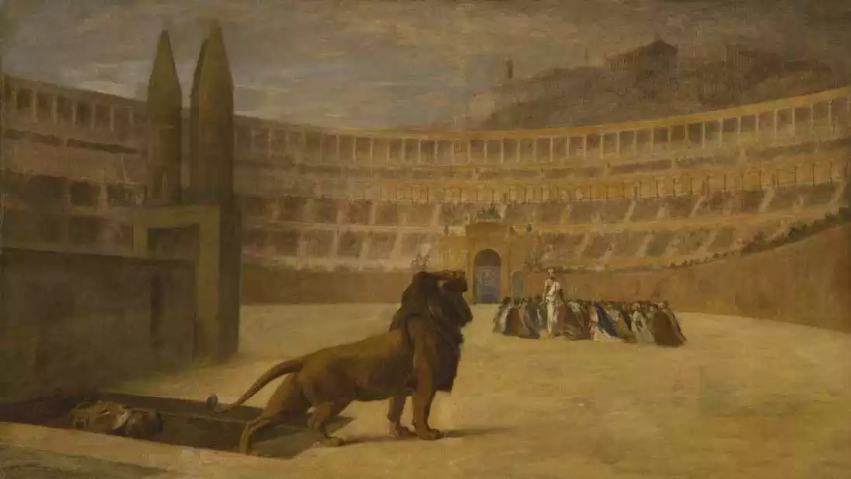
Sketch, 34 in (86.3 cm) x 59 in (149.8 cm)

It is disputed who Tacitus was referring to, the times between Jesus' death and the incident are close and predate the gospels by decades. Further, the notion of an 'anointed' (Christos) saviour was widespread at that time. Concerning the persecution of Christians in the Roman Empire, Tacitus wrote:

First, then, the confessed members of the sect were arrested; next, on their disclosures, vast numbers were convicted, not so much on the count of arson as for hatred of the human race. And derision accompanied their end: they were covered with wild beasts' skins and torn to death by dogs; or they were fastened on crosses, and, when daylight failed were burned to serve as lamps by night. Nero had offered his Gardens for the spectacle, and gave an exhibition in his Circus, mixing with the crowd in the habit of a charioteer, or mounted on his car. Hence, in spite of a guilt which had earned the most exemplary punishment, there arose a sentiment of pity, due to the impression that they were being sacrificed not for the welfare of the state but to the ferocity of a single man.

— Annals, xv. 44.

== History ==
W. T. Walters of Baltimore commissioned this painting in 1863, but the artist did not deliver it until twenty years later. In 1883, Gérôme completed this, one of his most famous works, and sent the following letter with the canvas to its new owner:

My Dear Sir: I send you a few notes about my picture The Christian Martyrs' Last Prayer, which you have bought. I regret to have made you wait for it so long, but I had a difficult task, being determined not to leave it until I accomplished all of which I was capable. This picture has been upon my easel for over twenty years. I have repainted it from the beginning three times; have rehandled and rechanged both the effect and the composition, always, however, preserving my first idea. This, therefore, is really the third canvas which you receive.

The scene is laid in the Circus Maximus, which might readily be mistaken for an amphitheatre, as in the picture only the end of the circus, and not the straight sides, is visible. But you will see on the left the meta, which ends the spina, and is the goal around which the chariots made their turns in the races, as I have indicated by the tracks of the wheels in the sand. The Circus Maximus was one of the mightiest monuments ever built. It held more than one hundred and fifty thousand spectators. Its left touched the Palace of the Caesars, whence a subterranean passage led directly to the Emperor's loge. In the time of the Caesars Christians were cruelly persecuted, and many were sentenced to be devoured by wild beasts.

This is the subject of my picture.

As they were religious enthusiasts, to die was a joy, and they cared little tor the animals, their only thought being to remain firm to the last. And rarely indeed was there found a case of apostasy. The Roman prisons were terrible dungeons, and Christians, being often long confined before the sacrifice, when led into the circus were emaciated by disease and covered only with rags. Their hearts alone remained strong, their faith alone remained unshaken. In the middle distance I have placed those destined to he burned alive. They were usually tied upon crosses and smeared with pitch to feed the flames. Alluding to this, Tacitus says, 'These Christians should certainly be put to death, but wherefore smear them with pitch and burn them like torches?' His sympathy, however, went no further. It was the custom to starve the wild beasts tor several days beforehand, and they were admitted to the arena up inclined planes.

Coming from the dark dens below, their first action was of astonishment upon facing the bright daylight and the great mass of people surrounding them.

They did then, as does to-day the Spanish bull when turned into the arena: entering with a bound, he suddenly halts in the very middle of a stride.

This moment I have sought to represent.

I consider this picture one of my most studied works, the one for which I have given myself most trouble.

Is it a success?

== See also ==
- Nero's Torches
- Academic art

== Sources ==
- Beeny, Emily (2010). "Blood Spectacle: Gérôme in the Arena". In Allan, Scott, & Morton, Mary (eds.). Reconsidering Gérôme. Los Angeles, CA: Getty Publications. pp. 40–54.
- Gotlieb, Marc (2010). "Gérôme's Cinematic Imagination". In Allan, Scott, & Morton, Mary (eds.). Reconsidering Gérôme. Los Angeles, CA: Getty Publications. pp. 54–65.
- Hering, Fanny Field (1892). Gérôme: The Life and Works of Jean Léon Gérôme. New York, NY: Cassell Publishing Company. pp. 2, 8, 242–243.
- Jackson, John (1962). Tacitus IV: Annals, Books XIII–XVI. London: William Heinemann Ltd.; Cambridge, MA: Harvard University Press. pp. 283–285.
- Junkelmann, Marcus (2000). "Familia Gladiatoria: The Heroes of the Amphitheatre". In Köhne, Eckart & Ewigleben, Cornelia (eds.). Gladiators and Caesars: The Power of Spectacle in Ancient Rome. University of California Press. pp. 31–32.
- Keim, Albert (1912). Gérôme. Cooper, Frederic Taber (trans.). Masterpieces in Colour. New York, NY: Frederick A. Stokes Company. p. 49.
- "The Christian Martyrs' Last Prayer". The Walters Art Museum. Retrieved 5 June 2022.
