= Speyer wine bottle =

Oldest unopened bottle of wine

- Römerwein
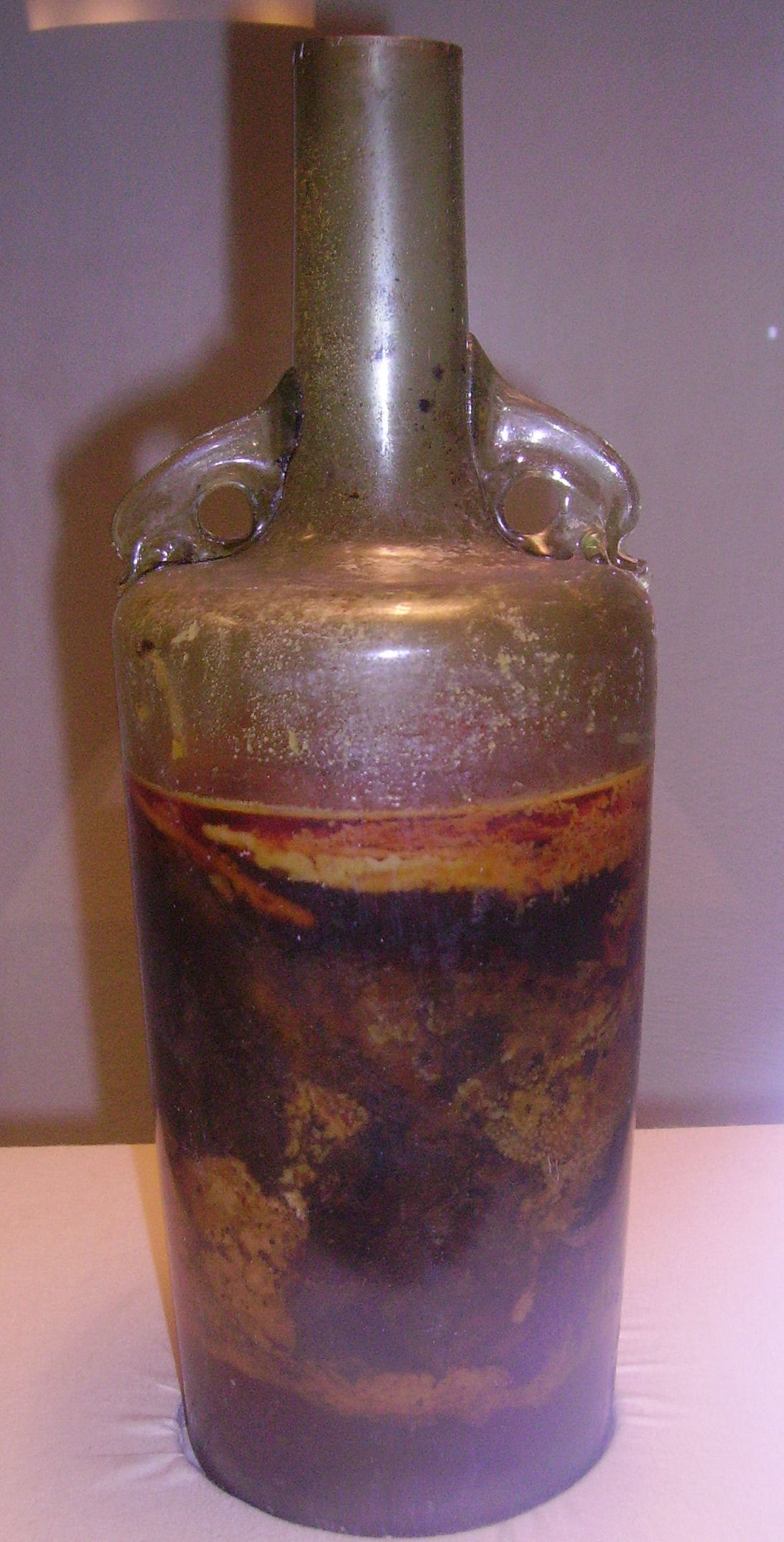
- Type: Sealed wine vessel
- Material: Glass
- Created: 325–350 AD
- Discovered: 1867; Near Speyer, Rhineland-Palatinate, Germany
- Present location: Historical Museum of the Palatinate, Speyer, Germany
- Culture: Roman

The Speyer wine bottle (or Römerwein) is a sealed vessel, presumed to contain liquid wine, and so named because it was unearthed from a Roman tomb found near Speyer, Germany. It contained the world's oldest known liquid wine (dated to about AD 325), until 2024, when a 1st century AD urn within a Roman tomb, found in the southern Spanish town of Carmona in 2019, was confirmed to still contain liquid wine.

== History ==
The Speyer wine bottle most likely holds wine, and was originally found in 1867, in what is now the Rhineland-Palatinate region of Germany near Speyer, one of the oldest settlements in the area. The artifact was known until 2024 as "the world's oldest existing bottle of wine". (Note: More precisely, the Speyer wine bottle is one of the oldest liquid wine still surviving, in contrast to the oldest known remains of wine (in the form of powdered residue), which date back to 6,000 BC.) The bottle has been dated between 325 and 350 AD and is the oldest known unopened bottle of wine in the world. Since its discovery, it has been exhibited at the Wine Museum section of the Historical Museum of the Palatinate in Speyer, always displayed in the same location within the museum. The Römerwein is housed in the museum's Tower Room. It is a 1.5 L (51 U.S. fl oz) glass vessel with amphora-like "shoulders," yellow-green in color, with dolphin-shaped handles. (Note: The same museum also houses "the oldest wine bottle in Germany that is still completely filled with wine", found in 1913 and bearing a vintage year of 1687 (from the Steinauer Vineyard near Naumburg).)

== Discovery ==
The bottle was discovered in 1867 during an excavation of a 4th-century AD Roman nobleman's tomb. The tomb contained two sarcophagi, one holding the body of a man and one a woman. One source says the man was a Roman legionary and the wine was a provision for his celestial journey. Of the six glass bottles in the woman's sarcophagus and the ten vessels in the man's sarcophagus, only one still contained a liquid. There is a clear liquid in the bottom third, and a mixture similar to rosin above.

== Wine preservation ==
While it has reportedly lost its ethanol content, analysis is consistent with at least part of the liquid having been wine. The wine was infused with a mixture of herbs. The preservation of the wine is attributed to the large amount of thick olive oil added to the bottle to seal the wine off from air, along with a hot wax seal. Petronius (c. 27–66 AD), in his work Satyricon, writes of plaster sealed bottles, and this one is analogous. The use of glass in the bottle is unusual, however, as typically Roman glass was too fragile to be dependable over time.

While scientists have considered accessing the liquid to further analyze the content, as of 2024, the bottle has remained unopened because of concerns about how the liquid would react when exposed to air. The museum's curator, Ludger Tekampe, has stated he has seen no variation in the bottle in over 25 years.

== See also ==
- Ancient Rome and wine
- Storage of wine
