= Ancient Rome and wine =

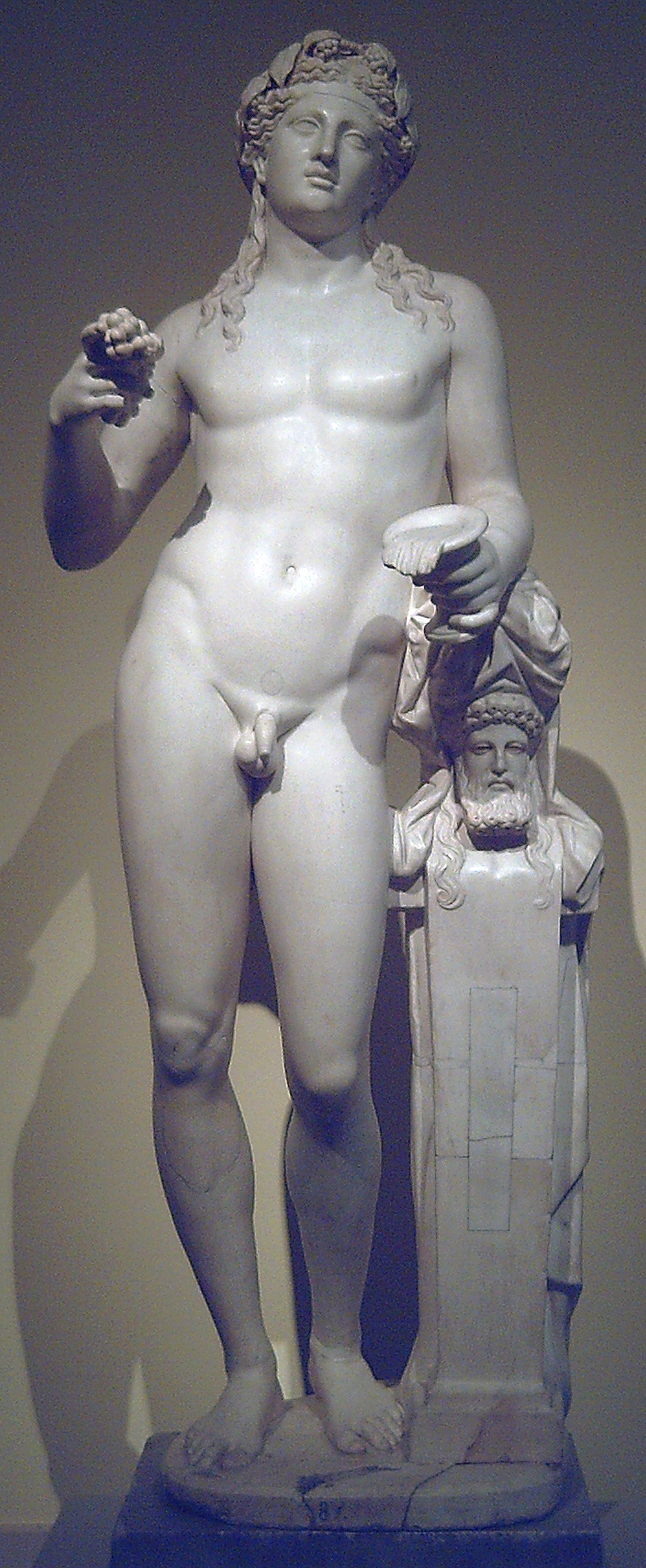
A Roman statue of Bacchus, god of wine (c. 150 AD, copied from a Hellenistic original, Prado Museum, Madrid).

Ancient Rome played a pivotal role in the history of wine. Influences on the viticulture of the Italian Peninsula can be traced to ancient Greeks, Phoenicians and the Etruscans. The rise of the Roman Empire saw both technological advances in and burgeoning awareness of winemaking, which spread to all parts of the empire. Rome's influence has had a profound effect on the histories of today's major winemaking regions in France, Germany, Italy, Portugal and Spain. New scientific techniques are adding even more detail to knowledge of Roman wine production, including the taste and sensory profiles of ancient Roman wine.

The Roman belief that wine was a daily necessity made the drink "democratic" and ubiquitous; in various qualities, it was available to slaves, peasants and aristocrats, men and women alike. To ensure the steady supply of wine to Roman soldiers and colonists, viticulture and wine production spread to every part of the empire. The economic opportunities presented by trading in wine drew merchants to do business with tribes native to Gaul and Germania, bringing Roman influences to these regions even before the arrival of the Roman military. Evidence of this trade and the far-reaching ancient wine economy is most often found through amphorae – ceramic jars used to store and transport wine and other commodities.

The works of Roman writers – most notably Cato, Columella, Horace, Catullus, Palladius, Pliny, Varro and Virgil – have provided insight into the role played by wine in Roman culture as well as contemporary understanding of winemaking and viticultural practices. Many of the techniques and principles first developed in ancient Roman times can be found in modern winemaking.

== Early history ==
The beginnings of domestic viticulture and winemaking on the Italian Peninsula are uncertain. Neolithic people groups exploited grapes in Italy, but it is not clear whether they experimented with fermentation. It is possible that the Mycenaean Greeks had some influences through early settlements in southern Italy, but the earliest evidence of Greek influence dates to 800 BC. Before this, viticulture was widely entrenched in Etruscan civilization, which was centered around the modern winemaking region of Tuscany.

The ancient Greeks saw wine as a staple of domestic life and a useful trade commodity. Their colonies were encouraged to plant vineyards for local use and trade with Greek city-states. Southern Italy's abundance of indigenous vines provided an ideal opportunity for wine production, giving rise to the Greek name for the region: Oenotria ("land of vines"). The southern Greek colonies probably also brought their own wine pressing methods with them and influenced Italian production methods.

In the Republican era, the culture of Roman winemaking was influenced by the viticultural skills and techniques of allies, and of regions conquered in Rome's expansion. The Greek settlements of southern Italy were brought under Roman control by 270 BC. The Etruscans, who had long-established, mostly maritime trade routes into Gaul, were largely Romanised by the 1st century BC.

The Punic Wars with Carthage had a particularly marked effect on Roman viticulture. The Carthaginians practised advanced viticultural techniques, described in the work of the Carthaginian writer Mago. Rome ransacked and burned the libraries of Carthage but the 28 volumes of Mago's agricultural treatise survived intact. They were subsequently translated into Latin and Greek in 146 BC. Although this work did not survive to the modern era, it has been extensively quoted in the influential writings of Romans Pliny, Columella, Varro and Gargilius Martialis.

=== Golden age ===
For most of Rome's winemaking history, Greek wine was the most highly prized, with domestic Roman wine commanding lower prices. The 2nd century BC saw the dawn of the "golden age" of Roman winemaking and the development of grand cru vineyards. The famous vintage of 121 BC became known as the Opimian vintage, named for consul Lucius Opimius. Remarkable for its abundant harvest and the unusually high quality of wine produced, some of the vintage's best examples were being enjoyed over a century later.

Pliny the Elder wrote extensively about the first growths of Rome—most notably Falernian, Alban and Caecuban wines. Other first-growth vineyards included Rhaeticum and Hadrianum from Atri of the Adriatic, along the Po in what are now the modern-day regions of Lombardy and Venice respectively; Praetutium (not related to the modern Italian city of Teramo, historically known as Praetutium) along the Adriatic coast near the border of Emilia-Romagna and Marche; and Lunense in modern-day Tuscany. Around Rome itself were the estates of Alban, Sabinum, Tiburtinum, Setinum and Signinum. Southward to Naples were the estates of Caecuban, Falernian, Caulinum, Trebellicanum, Massicum, Gauranium, and Surrentinum. In Sicily was the first-growth estate of Mamertinum.

Modern estimates of Roman wine consumption vary. All classes drank it, but not the very young. Women seem to have consumed less wine than men. Wine was almost always diluted before drinking, by as much as an equal volume of water, except for the elderly, libations to the gods, and alcoholics. Phillips estimates that on average, each member of Rome's urban population (man, woman or child) consumed half a litre of undiluted wine daily. Tchernia and Van Limbergen estimate the same average consumption levels per diem, per capita throughout the Greco-Roman world.

=== Pompeii ===
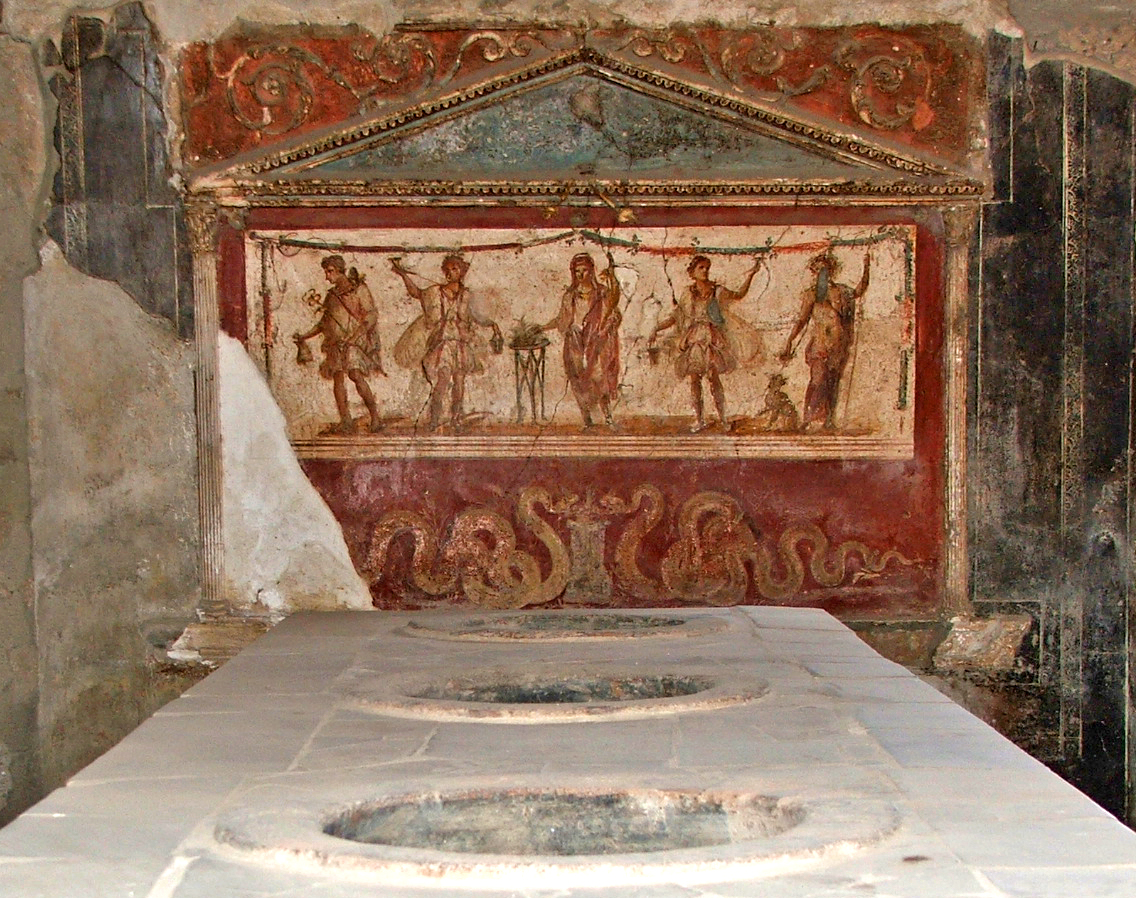
A painted Lararium (shrine) depicting Mercury (god of commerce) and Bacchus (god of wine) in Pompeii, in one of the hot-food establishments (thermopolia) that served the city prior to its destruction.

One of the most important wine centres of the Roman world was the city of Pompeii, located south of Naples, on the Campanian coast. An expanse of farms and vineyards covered the slopes of nearby Vesuvius, exploiting its exceptionally fertile soil to produce some of the best wines available to the Italian mainland, Rome and the Provinces.

The Pompeians themselves developed a widespread reputation for their wine-drinking capacity. The worship of Bacchus, the Roman god of wine, is attested by his image on frescoes and archaeological fragments throughout the region. Amphoras stamped with the emblems of Pompeian merchants have been found across the modern-day remnants of the Roman empire, including Bordeaux, Narbonne, Toulouse and Spain. Evidence in the form of counterfeit stamps on amphoras of non-Pompeian wine suggests that the popularity and reputation of Pompeian wine may have given rise to early wine fraud.

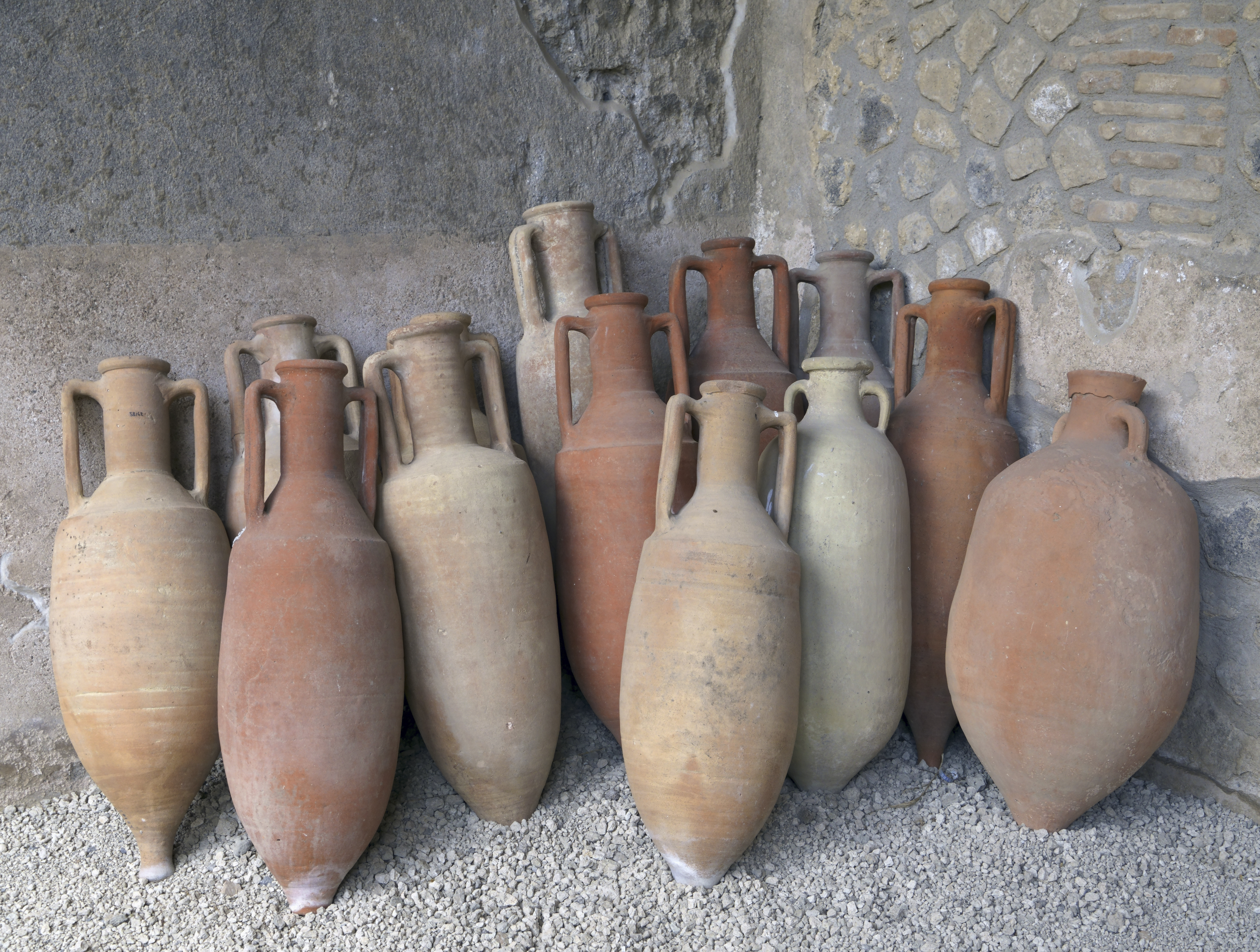
Ancient Roman amphoras in Pompeii

The 79 AD eruption of Mount Vesuvius had a devastating effect on Campana's well-established, long-distance maritime export and trade. Ports, vineyards, and the warehouses that stored the 78 AD vintage were destroyed. Prices rose sharply, making wine unaffordable to all but the most affluent, at a time when wine-drinking habits and demand had percolated down to the less affluent majority. The wine shortage, and the potential for increased profits, led to the hurried planting of new vineyards nearer to Rome and the replanting of existing grain fields with grapevines.

The subsequent wine surplus created by successful efforts to relieve the wine shortage caused a depression in price, and in the medium term, damage to the interests of wine producers and traders. The loss of grain fields now contributed to a food shortage for the growing Roman population. In 92 AD, Roman Emperor Domitian issued an edict that not only banned new vineyards in Rome but ordered the uprooting of half of the vineyards in Roman wine-producing provinces.

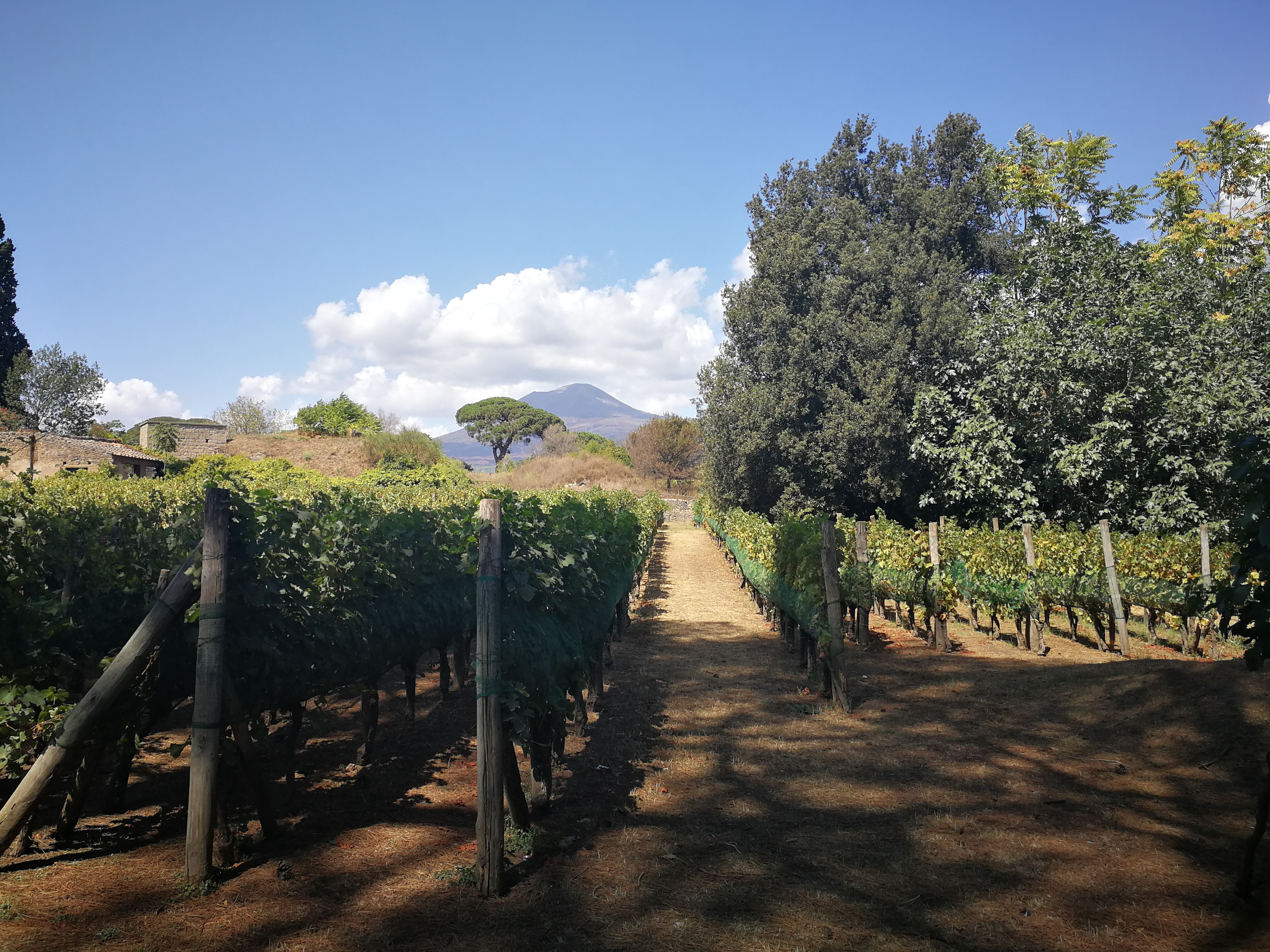
The 'Foro Boario' vineyard at Pompeii, replanted as it was at the time of the eruption, with small wine press in structure at back.

Although there is evidence to suggest that this edict was largely ignored in the Roman provinces, wine historians have debated the effect of the edict on the infant wine industries of Spain and Gaul. The intent of the edict was that fewer vineyards would result in only enough wine for domestic consumption, with little or no surplus for foreign trade. While vineyards were already established in these growing wine regions, the ignoring of trade considerations may have suppressed the spread of viticulture and winemaking in these areas. Domitian's edict remained in effect for nearly two centuries until Emperor Probus repealed it in 280 AD.

The preservation of Pompeii has provided unique insights into Roman wine making and viticulture. Preserved vine roots reveal planting patterns. Whole vineyards have been excavated within the city walls (for example, at Pompei's former cattle-market, the Forum Boarium). This complements evidence of pressing and production technologies that worked in tandem with this cultivation. Some of these vineyards have been replanted in the modern era with ancient grape varieties and experimental archaeology used to recreate Roman wine.

== Expansion of viticulture ==
Among the lasting legacies of the ancient Roman empire were the viticultural foundations laid by the Romans in lands that would become world-renowned wine regions. Through trade, military campaigns and settlements, Romans brought with them a taste for wine and the impetus to plant vines. Trade was the first and farthest-reaching arm of their influence, and Roman wine merchants were eager to trade with enemy and ally alike—from the Carthaginians and peoples of southern Spain to the Celtic tribes in Gaul and Germanic tribes of the Rhine and Danube.

During the Gallic Wars, when Julius Caesar brought his troops to Cabyllona in 59 BC, he found two Roman wine merchants already established in business trading with the local tribes. In places like Bordeaux, Mainz, Trier and Colchester where Roman garrisons were established, vineyards were planted to supply local need and limit the cost of long-distance trading. Roman settlements were founded and populated by retired soldiers with knowledge of Roman viticulture from their families and life before the military; vineyards were planted in their new homelands. While it is possible that the Romans imported grapevines from Italy and Greece, there is sufficient evidence to suggest that they cultivated native vines that may be the ancestors of the grapes grown in those provinces today.

As the republic grew into empire beyond the peninsula, wine's trade and market economy echoed this growth. The wine trade in Italy consisted of Rome's sale of wine abroad to settlements and provinces around the Mediterranean Sea, yet by the end of the 1st century AD, its exports had competition from the provinces, themselves exporters to Rome.

=== Hispania ===
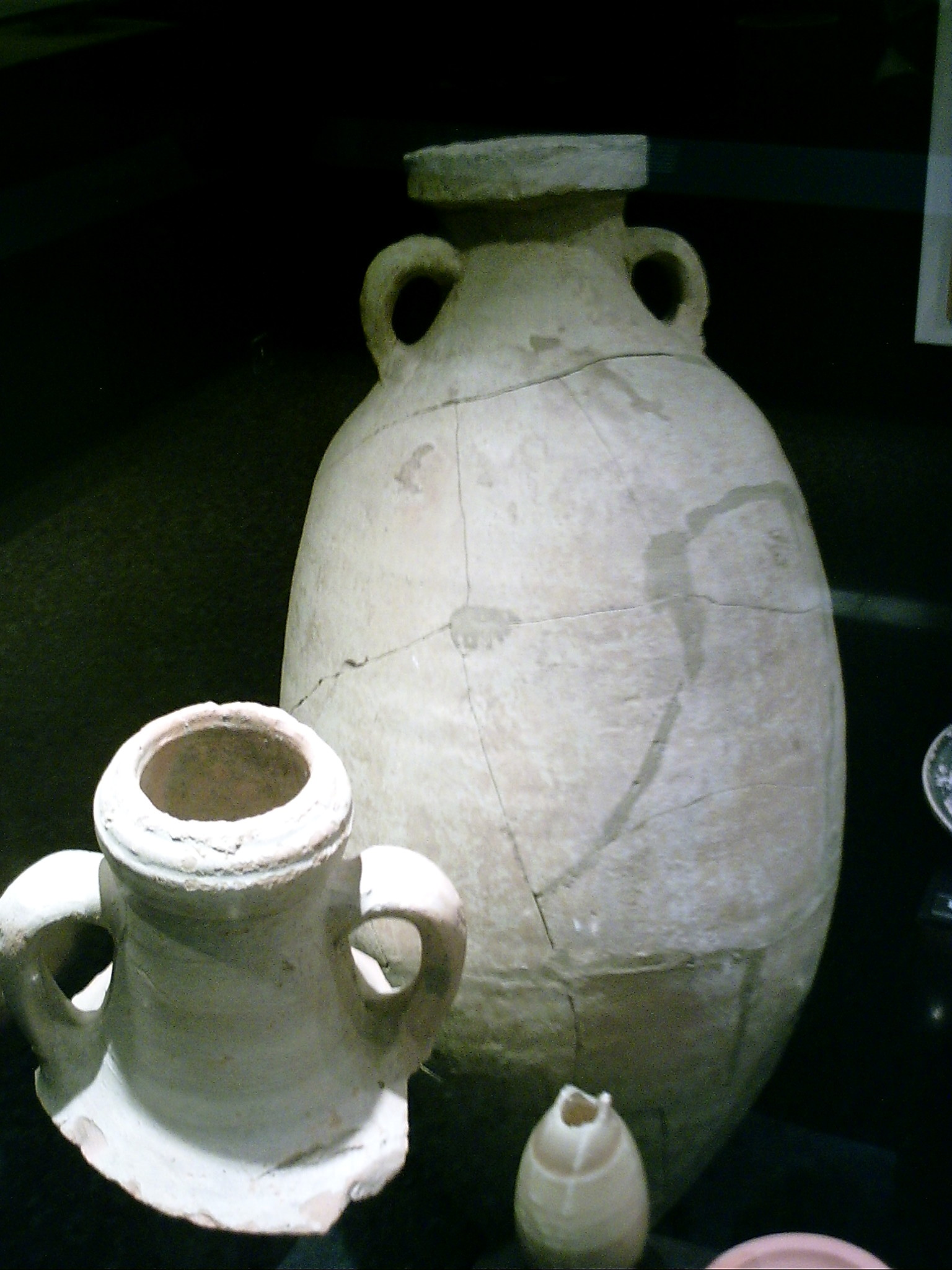
Roman amphorae recovered from Catalonia.

Rome's defeat of Carthage in the Punic Wars brought the southern and coastal territories of Spain under its control, but the complete conquest of the Iberian Peninsula remained unaccomplished until the reign of Caesar Augustus. Roman colonization led to the development of Tarraconensis in the northern regions of Spain (including what are now the modern winemaking regions of Catalonia, the Rioja, the Ribera del Duero, and Galicia) and Hispania Baetica (which includes modern Andalusia) Montilla-Moriles winemaking region of Cordoba and the sherry winemaking region of Cádiz.

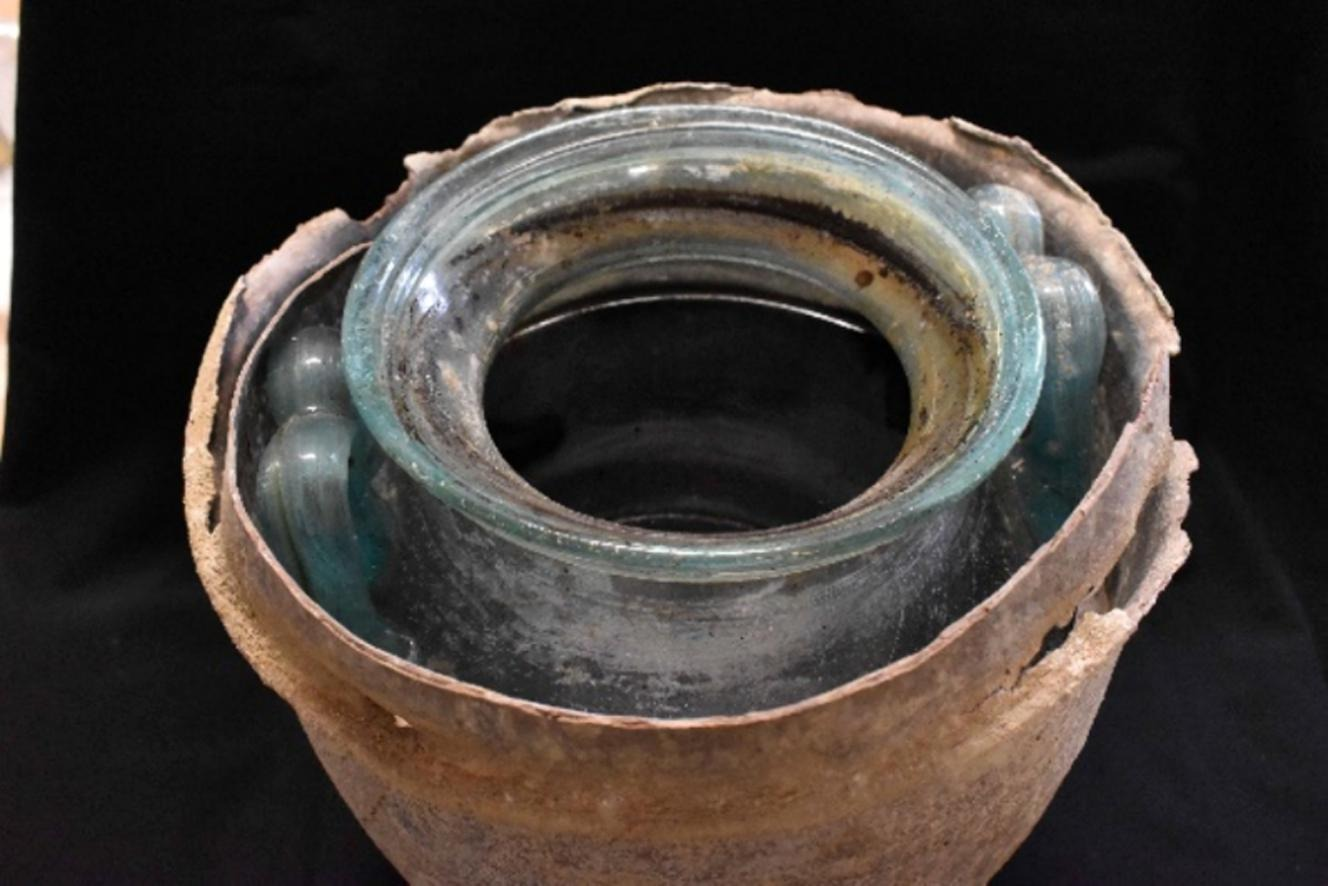
The Carmona Wine Urn, the oldest surviving liquid wine, discovered in Carmona, Spain in 2019 (1st century AD)

While the Carthaginians and Phoenicians were the first to introduce viticulture to Spain, Rome's influential wine technology and the development of road networks brought new economic opportunities to the region, elevating grapes from a private agricultural crop to an important component of a viable commercial enterprise. Spanish wine was in Bordeaux before the region produced its own. French historian Roger Dion has suggested that the balisca vine (common in Spain's northern provinces, particularly Rioja) was brought from Rioja to plant the first Roman vineyards of Bordeaux.

Spanish wines were frequently traded in Rome. The poet Martial described a highly regarded wine known as ceretanum from Ceret (modern-day Jerez de la Frontera). Wine historian Hugh Johnson believes this wine was an early ancestor of sherry. Spanish wines penetrated more extensively than Italian wines into the Roman Empire, with amphoras from Spain discovered in Aquitaine, Brittany, the Loire Valley, Normandy, Britain and the German frontier. The historian Strabo noted in his work Geographica that the vineyards of Baetica were famous for their beauty. The Roman agricultural writer Columella was a native of Cádiz and was duly influenced by the region's viticulture.

In 2019, the oldest surviving liquid wine, dating to the 1st century, was discovered in the city of Carmona, Spain, part of Hispania Baetica, its contents were identified as a type of Sherry.

=== Gaul ===
There is archaeological evidence to suggest that the Celts first cultivated the grapevine in Gaul. Grape pips have been found throughout France, pre-dating the Greeks and Romans, with some examples found near Lake Geneva dated to 10,000 BC. The extent to which the Celts and Gallic tribes produced wine is not clearly known, but the arrival of the Greeks near Massalia in 600 BC certainly introduced new types and styles of winemaking and viticulture. The limit of Greek viticultural influence was planting in regions with Mediterranean climates where olives and fig trees would also flourish.

The Romans looked for hillside terrain in regions near a river and an important town. Their knowledge of the sciences included the tendency for cold air to flow down a hillside and to pool in frost pockets in the valley. As these are poor conditions under which to grow grapes, they were avoided in favor of sunny hillsides that could provide sufficient warmth to ripen grapes, even in northerly areas. When the Romans seized Massalia in 125 BC, they pushed farther inland and westward. They founded the city of Narbonne in 118 BC (in the modern-day Languedoc region) along the Via Domitia, the first Roman road in Gaul. The Romans established lucrative trading relations with local tribes of Gaul, despite their potential to produce wine of their own. The Gallic tribes paid high prices for Roman wine, with a single amphora worth the value of a slave.

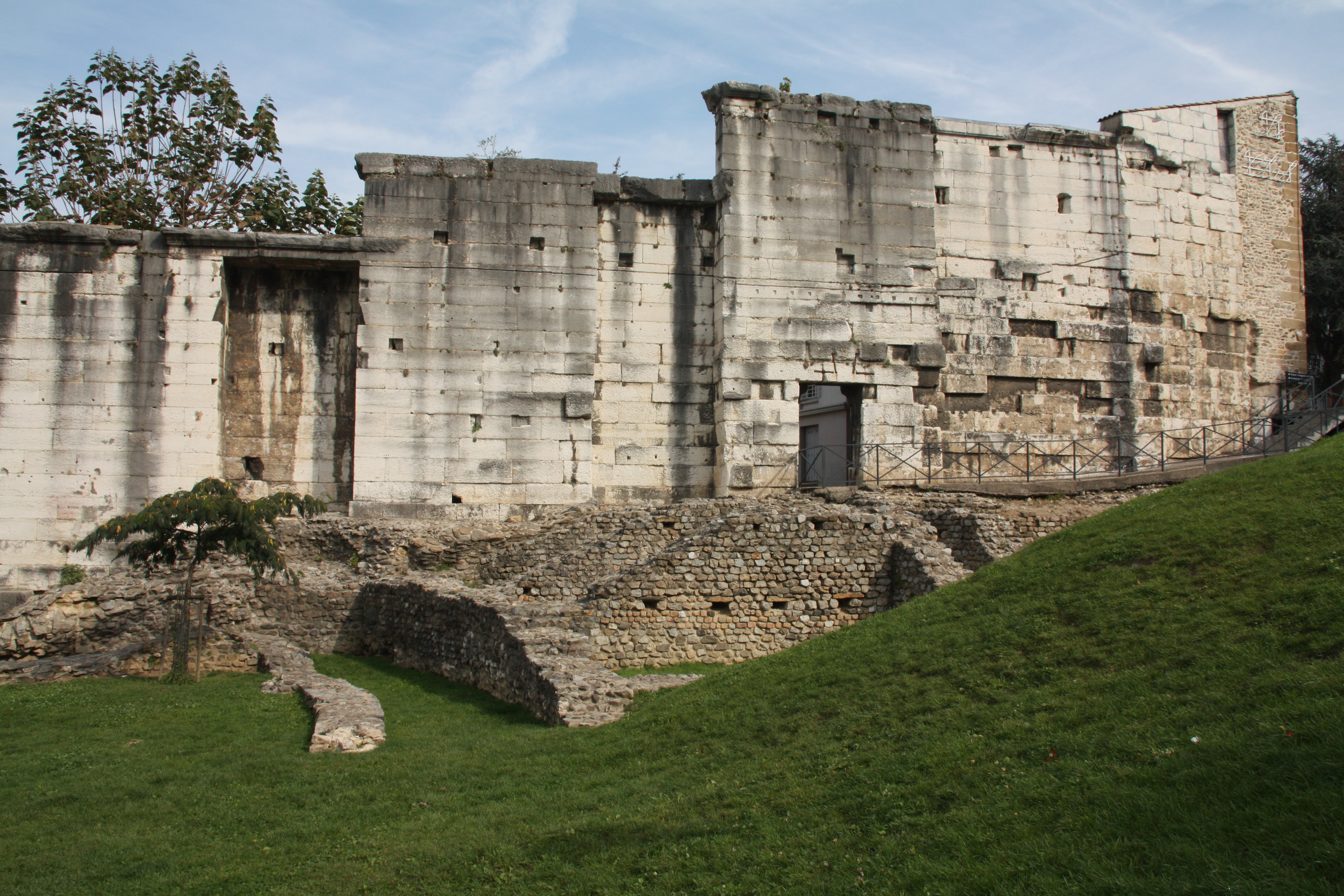
Roman ruins in Vienne. The first French wine to receive international acclaim was produced in this area near the modern Côte-Rôtie wine region.

From the Mediterranean coast, the Romans pushed further up the Rhone Valley, to areas where olives and figs were unable to grow but where oak trees were still found. As a result of their experience in what is now northeastern Italy, the Romans knew that regions where Quercus ilex were found had climates warm enough to allow the full ripening of grapes. In the 1st century AD, Pliny notes that the settlement of Vienne (near what is now the Côte-Rôtie AOC) produced a resinated wine that fetched high prices in Rome. Wine historian Hanneke Wilson notes that this Rhone wine was the first truly French wine to receive international acclaim.

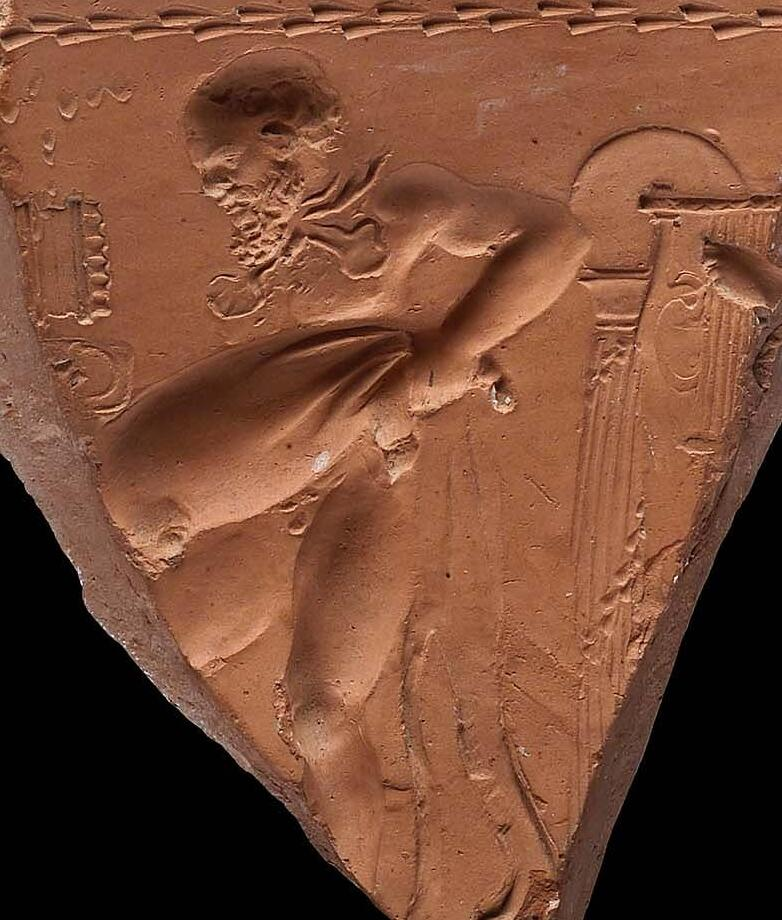
Portion of bearded satyr, emptying a wine-skin, Arretine ware, Roman, Augustan Period 31 BC – AD 14

The first mention of Roman interest in the Bordeaux region was in Strabo's report to Augustus that there were no vines down the river Tarn towards Garonne into the region known as Burdigala. The wine for this seaport was being supplied by the "high country" region of Gaillac in the Midi-Pyrénées region. The Midi had abundant indigenous vines that the Romans cultivated, many of which are still being used to produce wine, including—Duras, Fer, Ondenc and Len de l'El. The location of Bordeaux on the Gironde estuary made it an ideal seaport from which to transport wine along the Atlantic Coast and to the British Isles. Bordeaux soon became self-sufficient with its own vineyards to export its own wine to Roman soldiers stationed in Britain. In the 1st century AD, Pliny the Elder mentions plantings in Bordeaux, including the Balisca grape (previously known in Spain) under the synonym of Biturica after the local Bituriges tribe. Ampelographers note that corruption of the name Biturica is Vidure, a French synonym of Cabernet Sauvignon, perhaps pointing to the ancestry of this vine with the Cabernet family that includes Cabernet Sauvignon, Cabernet Franc, Merlot and Petit Verdot.

Further up the Rhone, along the Saône tributary, the Romans encountered the areas that would become the modern-day wine regions of Beaujolais, the Mâconnais, the Côte Chalonnaise and the Côte d'Or. Rome's first allies among the tribes of Gaul were the Aedui, whom they supported by founding the city of Augustodunum in what is now the Burgundy wine region. While it is possible that vineyards were planted in the 1st century AD, shortly after the founding of Augustodunum, the first definitive evidence of wine production comes from an account of the visit by Emperor Constantine to the city in 312 AD.

The founding of France's other great wine regions is not as clear. The Romans' propensity for planting on hillsides has left archaeological evidence of Gallo-Roman vineyards in the chalk hillsides of Sancerre. In the 4th century, the Emperor Julian had a vineyard near Paris on the hill of Montmartre, and a 5th-century villa in what is now Épernay shows the Roman influence in the Champagne region.

=== Germania ===
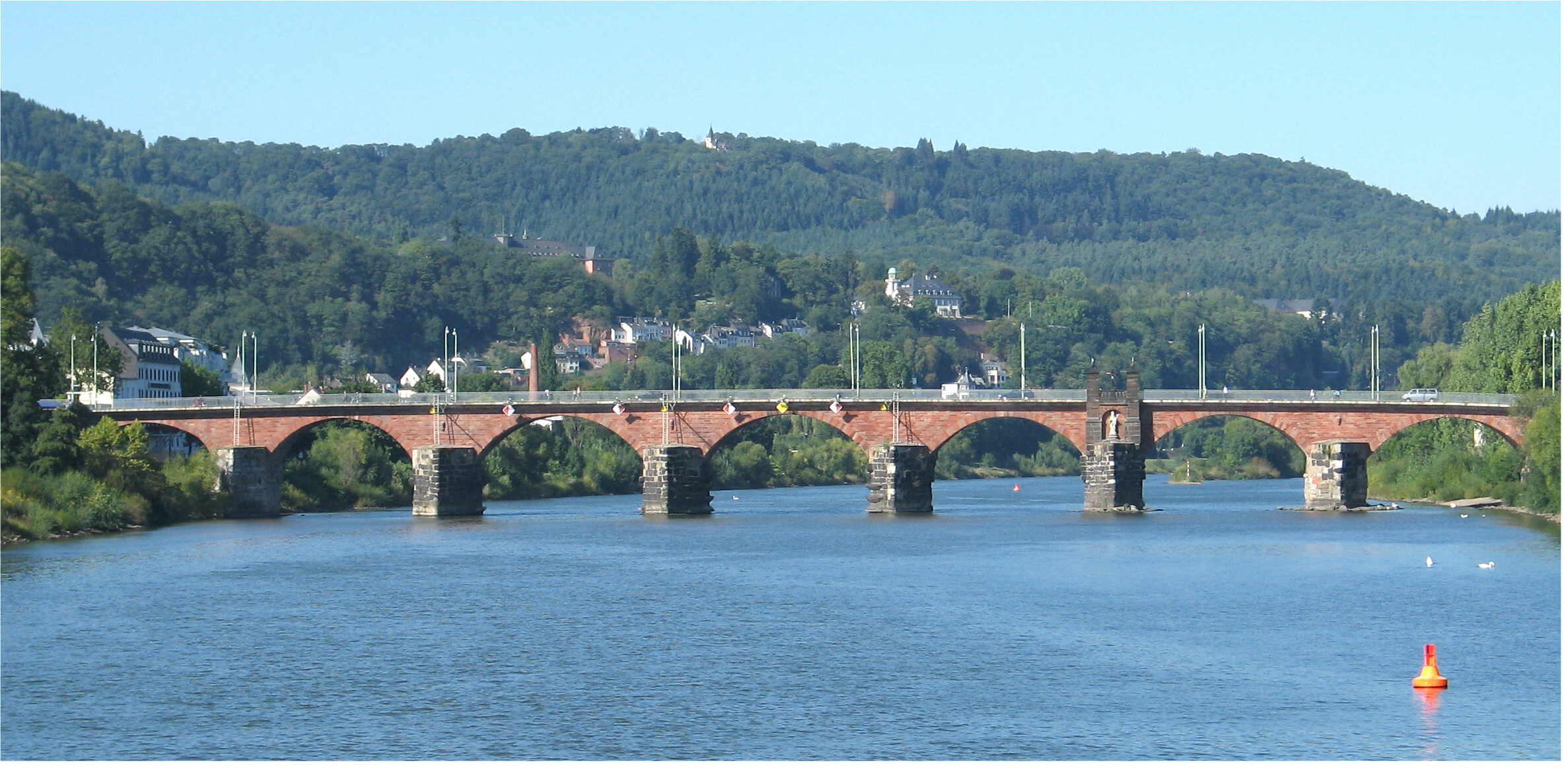
The Roman bridge of Trier crosses the river Mosel. The Romans found that planting vines on the steep banks along the river provided enough warmth to ripen wine grapes.

Although wild V. vinifera vines have existed along the Rhine since prehistory, the earliest evidence of viticulture dates to the Roman conquest and settlement of the western territories of Germania. Agricultural tools, such as pruning knives, have been found near Roman garrison posts in Trier and Cologne, but the first definitive record of wine production dates to the 370 AD work by Ausonius titled Mosella, wherein he described vibrant vineyards along the Mosel. A native of Bordeaux, Ausonius compared the vineyards favorably to those of his homeland and seems to indicate that viticulture had long been present in this area. The reasons for planting Rhineland were to cater to the growing demand of Roman soldiers along the Limes Germanicus (German frontier) and the high costs associated with importing wine from Rome, Spain or Bordeaux. The Romans briefly considered building a canal that would link the Saône and Mosel rivers in order to facilitate waterway trading. The alternative was to drink what Tacitus described as an inferior beer-like beverage.

The steep hillsides along the rivers Mosel and Rhine provided an opportunity to extend the cultivation of grapes to a northerly location. A south-southwest-facing slope maximizes the amount of sunshine vines receive, with the degree of angle allowing the vines to receive the sun's rays perpendicularly rather than at the low or diffuse angle vineyards on flatter terrain receive. Hillsides offered the added benefit of shielding vines from the cold northern winds, and the rivers' reflection offered additional warmth to aid in ripening the grapes. With the right type of grape (perhaps even an early ancestor of the German wine grape Riesling), the Romans found that wine could be produced in Germania. From the Rhine, German wine would make its way downriver to the North Sea and to merchants in Britain, where it began to develop a good reputation.

Despite military hostilities, the neighboring Germanic tribes like the Alamanni and Franks were eager customers for German wine until a 5th-century edict forbade the sale of wine outside of Roman settlements. Wine historian Hugh Johnson believes this might have been an added incentive for the barbarian invasions and sacking of Roman settlements such as Trier—"an invitation to break down the door."

=== Britannia ===
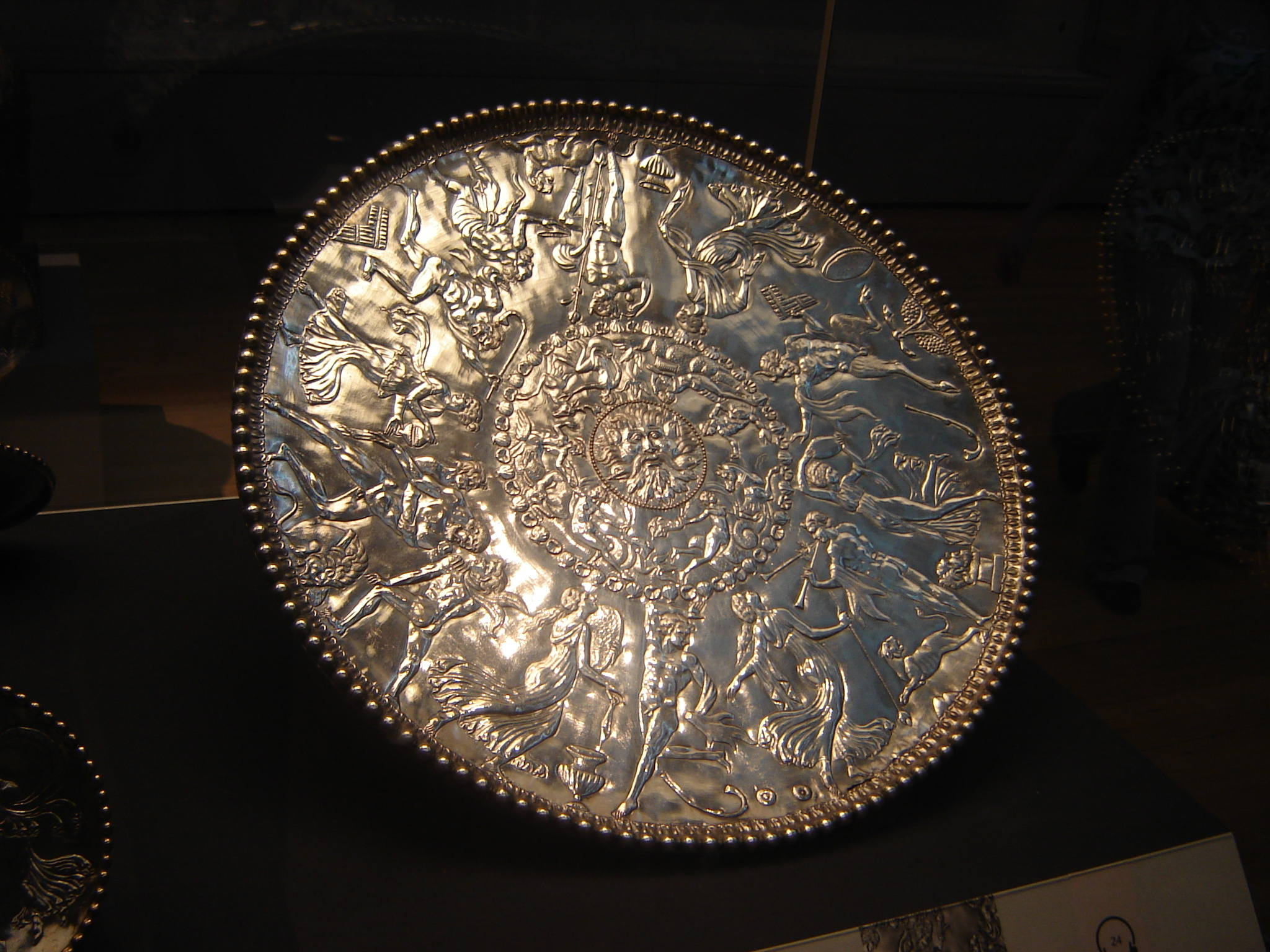
The silver serving tray depicting Bacchus found in Mildenhall

Rome's influence on Britain with respect to wine is not so much viticultural as it is cultural. Throughout modern history, the British have played a key role in shaping the world of wine and defining global wine markets. Though evidence of V. vinifera vines in the British Isles dates to the Hoxnian Stage when the climate was warmer than it is now, British interest in wine production greatly increased following the Roman conquest of Britain in the 1st century AD.

Amphoras from Italy indicate that wine was regularly transported to Britain at great expense by sea, around the Iberian Peninsula. The development of wine-producing regions in Bordeaux and Germany made supplying the needs of local Roman colonists much easier and cheaper, but in Britain, no certain evidence of an early local or provincial wine industry has been found, possibly because climate and soil conditions have not favoured its preservation. Remnants of amphora production at Brockley Hill, in Middlesex, have been dated to 70–100 AD, and may be explained as a sign of short-lived local wine production, brought to an end by Domitian's edict against vine cultivation during a widespread grain famine. The edict was rescinded by Probus in 270 AD. Investigations of the Nene Valley and pollen analysis by Brown et al confirm several viticulture sites, at least from that date.

More than 400 artifacts depicting Bacchus have been found throughout Britain, evidence of his widespread cult as a wine-god. They include the great silver dish of the Mildenhall Treasure, showing the rites of Bacchus' procession and his triumph over Hercules in a drinking contest. In Colchester, the early capital of Roman Britain, excavations have uncovered containers identifying over 60 different types of wines from Italy, Spain, the Rhine and Bordeaux.

== Growers and traders ==
Roman attitudes to wine were complex, especially among the equestrian and senatorial classes; the latter were supposed to have no interest in personal profits. Equestrian entrepreneurs often acted as agents and negotiators for landowners of the senatorial class, whose estates, large or small, were traditionally used to provide grain, olives and other food staples, not ingredients for luxuries such as wine production. Viticulture involved a very different set of skills, practices, abilities and landscapes than traditional agriculture, and a deal of expense at harvest-time, for picking, pressing and storage. The yields were notoriously unpredictable. For a large estate, a bad season's losses could be enormous, or the profits exceed what was considered proper for an aristocratic farmer-citizen. Very large wine estates were therefore quite rare, and the lowest risk investment strategy was an exchange of small, specialist properties already in production, along with the equipment, knowledge and skills that came with them, a ready-made wine estate. Considering the disinhibiting, even disabling effects of alcohol, any investment in commercial-scale wine production by Rome's ruling class was also of doubtful morality. Purcell suggests that for these reasons, Rome's upper classes were committed to refinement and high quality, and had only marginal open involvement in high volume wine production and the wine trade until the Imperial era.

=== Roman writings on wine ===
Works of classical Roman writers—most notably Cato, Columella, Horace, Palladius, Pliny, Varro and Virgil—shed light on the role of wine in Roman culture as well as contemporary winemaking and viticultural practices. Some of these influential techniques can be found in modern winemaking. These include the consideration of climate and landscape in deciding which grape varieties to plant, the benefits of different trellising and vine-training systems, the effects of pruning and harvest yields on the quality of wine, as well as winemaking techniques such as sur lie aging after fermentation and the maintenance of sanitary practices throughout the winemaking process to avoid contamination, impurities and spoilage.

=== Marcus Porcius Cato the Elder ===
Marcus Porcius Cato was a Roman statesman. He had been raised on his family's farm in Reate, northeast of Rome, and wrote extensively on a variety of subjects in De agri cultura (Concerning the Cultivation of the Land), the oldest surviving work of Latin prose. He comments in detail on viticulture and winemaking. He believes that grapes produce the best wine when they receive the maximum amount of sunshine, so he recommends that vines be trained in trees as high as possible and have all leaves removed once the grapes begin to ripen. He advises winemakers to wait until the grapes are fully ripe before harvesting, to ensure high quality in the wine and thus maintain the reputation of the wine estate. Inferior and sour wines should be reserved for the work-hands. Cato claimed that vineyard cultivation was the only profitable agricultural use for slaves; if they became unproductive for any reason, their rations should be cut. Once they were worn out, they should be sold on.

Cato was an early advocate for hygiene in winemaking, recommending, for example, that wine jars be wiped clean twice a day with a new broom every time; thoroughly sealing the jars after fermentation to prevent the wine from spoiling and turning into vinegar; and not filling the amphoras to the top but leaving some head space, allowing a degree of oxidation. Cato's manual was fervently followed, becoming the standard textbook of Roman winemaking for centuries.

=== Columella ===
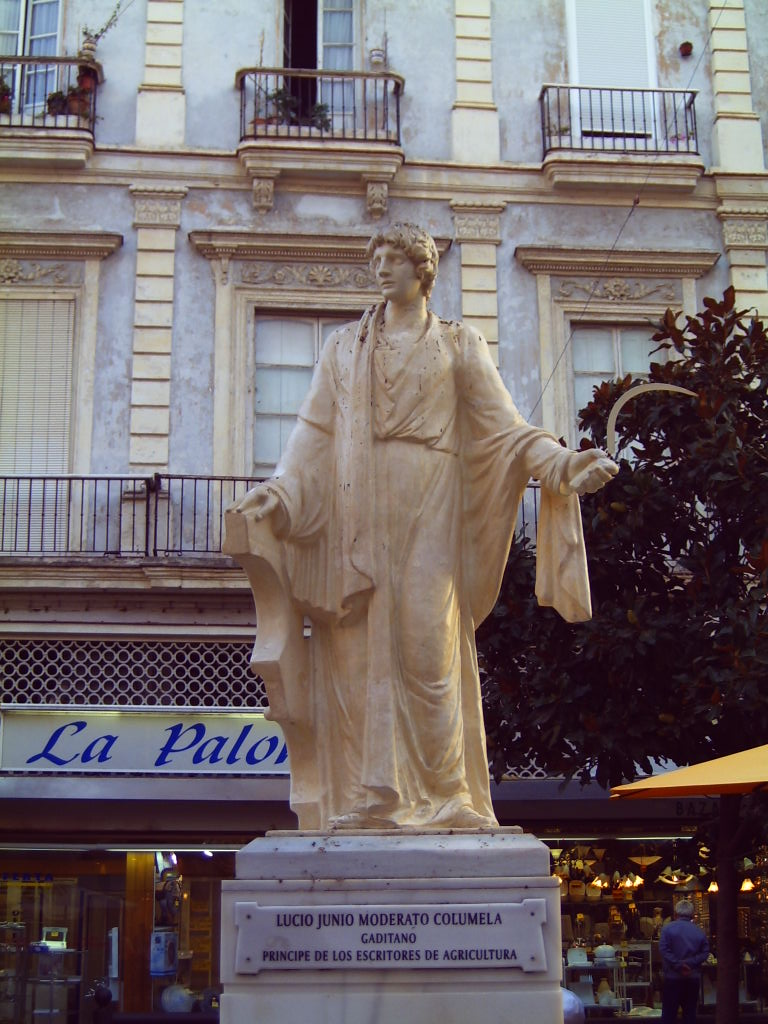
Modern statue of Columella in his native land of Cádiz.

Columella was a 1st-century AD writer. His 12-volume De re rustica is considered one of the most important works on Roman agriculture. Its eleven volumes of prose are augmented by one on gardens (Volume 10), in hexameter verse. Volumes 3 and 4 delve into the technical aspects of viticulture, including advice on which soil types yield the best wine. Volume 12 concerns various aspects of winemaking.

Columella describes the boiling of grape must in a lead vessel to concentrate sugars and at the same time allow the lead to impart sweetness and desirable texture to the wine, a practice that may have contributed to lead poisoning. He presents precise details on how a well-run vineyard should operate, from the optimum breakfast for slaves to the yield of grapes from each jugerum of land and the pruning practices to ensure those yields. Many modern elements of vine training and trellising are evident in Columella's description of best practices. In his ideal vineyard, vines are planted two paces apart and fastened with willow withies to chestnut stakes about the height of a man. He also describes some of the wines of Roman provinces, noting the potential of wines from Spain and the Bordeaux region. Columella extols the quality of wines made from the ancient grape varieties Balisca and Biturica, believed by ampelographers to be ancestral to the Cabernet family.

=== Pliny the Elder ===
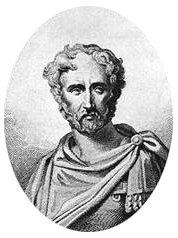
Imaginary portrayal of Pliny the Elder.

Pliny the Elder was a 1st-century AD naturalist and author of the 37-volume Roman encyclopedia Naturalis Historia (Natural History), dedicated to the Emperor Titus. Published after Pliny's death near Pompeii following the eruption of Mount Vesuvius, the work covers a vast array of topics, including serious discourse on viticulture and wine.

Book 14 deals exclusively with the subject of wine itself, including a ranking of the "first growths" of Rome. Book 17 includes a discussion of various viticultural techniques and an early formalization of the concept of terroir, in that unique places produce unique wine. In his rankings of the best Roman wines, Pliny concludes that the vineyard has more influence on the resulting quality of wine than the particular vine. The early sections of Book 23 deal with some of the purported medicinal properties of wine.

Pliny was a strong advocate for training vines up trees in a pergola, noting that the finest wines in Campania all derived from this practice. Due to the dangers in working on and pruning vines trained this way, however, he advised not using slaves, who were costly to buy and maintain, but rather vineyard workers hired with a stipulation in their contract to cover grave and funeral expenses. He described some contemporary varieties, recommending Aminean and Nomentan as the best. Some modern ampelographers believe that two white wine varieties mentioned, Arcelaca and Argitis, may be early ancestors to the modern grape Riesling.

Pliny is also the source for one of the most famous Latin quotations about wine: "In vino veritas," or "There's truth in wine," referring to the often confessional loquacity of the intoxicated. This is not a commendation on Pliny's part: he regrets that the "excessive candour" of drunkards can lead to serious breaches of etiquette, and thoughtless disclosure of matters best kept private.

=== Other writers ===
Marcus Terentius Varro, whom the rhetorician Quintilian called "the most learned man among the Romans," wrote extensively on such topics as grammar, geography, religion, law and science, but only his agricultural treatise De re rustica (or Rerum rusticarum libri) has survived in its entirety. While there is evidence that he borrowed some of this material from Cato's work, Varro credits the lost multi-volume work of Mago the Carthaginian, as well as the Greek writers Aristotle, Theophrastus and Xenophon. Varro's treatise is written as a dialogue and divided into three parts, the first of which contains most of the discussion on wine and viticulture. He defines old wine as one removed from its vintage by at least a year; nonetheless, he notes that while some wines are best consumed young, especially fine wines such as Falernian are meant to be consumed much older.

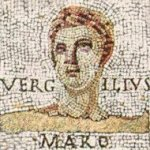
Virgil.

The poetry of Virgil recalls that of the Greek poet Hesiod in its focus on the morality and virtue of viticulture, particularly the austerity, integrity and hard work of Roman farmers. The second book of the didactic poem Georgics deals with viticultural matters. Virgil advises leaving some grapes on the vine until late November when they become "stiff with frost." This early version of ice wine would have produced sweet wines without the acidity of wine made from grapes harvested earlier.

Virgil's contemporary Horace wrote often of wine, though no single work is devoted entirely to the subject. He espoused an Epicurean view of taking life's pleasures, including wine, in moderation. Among the earliest recorded examples of deliberately choosing a wine for a specific occasion, Horace's Odes included serving a wine from the birth-year vintage at a celebration of an honored guest. He writes of serving simple wines for everyday occasions and saving celebrated wines such as Caecuban for special events. Horace answered the question posed by the Alexandrian poet Callimachus as to whether water or wine was the preferred drink of poetic inspiration by enthusiastically siding with Cratinus and the wine drinkers. His affinity for wine was such that while contemplating his death, he expressed more dread at the thought of departing from his beloved wine cellar than his wife.

Palladius was the 4th-century writer of the 15-volume agricultural treatise Opus agriculturae or De re rustica, the first volume of which was an introduction to basic farming principles. The 12 volumes following were dedicated to each month of the calendar and the specific agricultural tasks to be performed in that month. While Palladius deals with a variety of agricultural crops, he devotes more discussion to the practices of the vineyard than to any other. The last two volumes treat mostly veterinary medicine for farm animals but also include a detailed account of late-Roman grafting practices. Though borrowing heavily from Cato, Varro, Pliny and Columella, the work of Palladius is one of the few Roman agricultural accounts to still be widely used through the Middle Ages and into the early Renaissance. His writings on viticulture were widely quoted by Vincent of Beauvais, Albertus Magnus and Pietro Crescenzi.

== Roman winemaking ==
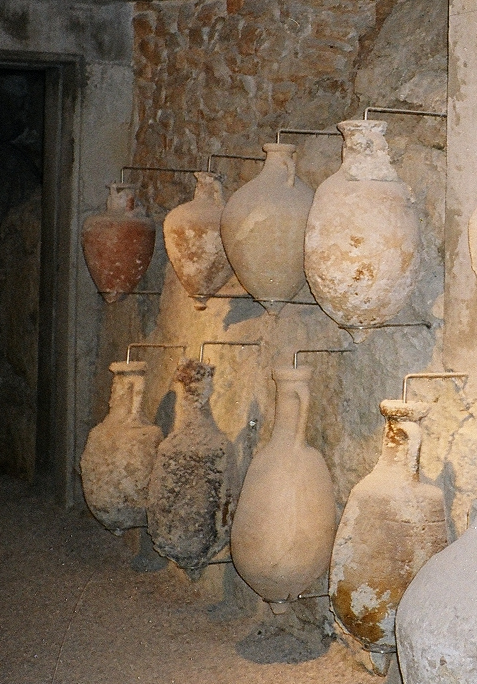
After fermentation, Roman wine was stored in amphoras to be used for serving or further aging.

The process of making wine in ancient Rome began immediately after the harvest with treading the grapes (often by foot), in a manner similar to the French pigeage. The juice thus expressed was the most highly prized and kept separate from what would later come from pressing the grape. This free-run juice was also believed to have the most beneficial medicinal properties.

Cato described the process of pressing as taking place in a special room that included an elevated concrete platform containing a shallow basin with raised curbs. The basin was shaped with gentle slopes that led to a runoff point. Horizontally across the basin were long, wooden beams whose front parts were attached by rope to a windlass. The crushed grapes were placed between the beams, with pressure applied by winding down the windlass. The pressed juice ran down between the beams and collected in the basin. As the construction and use of a wine press was labor-intensive and expensive, its use was generally restricted to large estates, with smaller wineries relying on treading alone to obtain grape juice.

If grape pressing was used, an estate would press the skins one to three times. Since juice from later pressings would be coarser and more tannic, the third pressing normally made wine of low quality called lora. After pressing, the grape must was stored in large earthenware jars known as dolia. With a capacity of up to several thousand liters, these jars were often partially buried into the floors of a barn or warehouse. Fermentation took place in the dolium, lasting from two weeks to a month before the wine was removed and put in amphoras for storage. Small holes drilled into the top allowed the carbon dioxide gas to escape.

To enhance flavor, white wine might age on its lees, and chalk or marble dust was sometimes added to reduce acidity. Wines were often exposed to high temperatures and "baked," a process similar to that used to make modern Madeira. To enhance a wine's sweetness, a portion of the wine must was boiled to concentrate the sugars in the process known as defrutum and then added to the rest of the fermenting batch. (Columella's writings suggest that the Romans believed boiling the must acted as a preservative as well.) Lead was also sometimes used as a sweetening agent, or honey could be added, as much as 3 kilograms (6.6 lb) recommended to sweeten 12 litres (3.2 US gal) of wine to Roman tastes. Another technique was to withhold a portion of the sweeter, unfermented must and blend it with the finished wine, a method known today as süssreserve.

== Wine styles ==
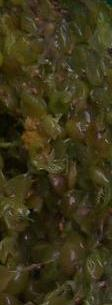
The grape material from pomace (pictured) was used to make lora, a low-quality wine commonly drunk by Roman slaves.

As in much of the ancient world, sweet white wine was the most highly regarded style. Wine was often diluted with warm water, occasionally seawater.

The ability to age was a desirable trait in Roman wines, with mature examples from older vintages fetching higher prices than that from the current vintage, regardless of its overall quality. Roman law codified the distinction between "old" and "new" as whether wine had aged for at least a year. Falernian was particularly valued for its aging ability, said to need at least 10 years to mature but being at its best between 15 and 20 years. The white wine from Surrentine was said to need at least 25 years.

In the manner of Greek wine, Roman wine was often flavored with herbs and spices (similar to modern vermouth and mulled wine) and was sometimes stored in resin-coated containers, giving it a flavor similar to modern retsina. Romans were particularly interested in the aroma of wine and experimented with various methods of enhancing a wine's bouquet. One technique that gained some usage in southern Gaul was planting herbs such as lavender and thyme in the vineyards, believing that their flavors would pass through the ground and into the grapes. Modern-day wines from the Rhone are often characterized by using the aroma descriptors of lavender and thyme, presumably as a reflection of the grape varieties used and the terroir. Another widespread practice was the storage of amphoras in a smoke chamber called a fumarium to add smokiness to a wine's flavor. Passum, or wine made from dried grapes or raisins, was also particularly popular and was produced in the eastern Mediterranean. It was widely used in ritual contexts and also found popularity in the kitchen and medicinal spheres.

The term "vinum" spanned a broad spectrum of wine-based beverages, the quality of which depended on the amount of pure grape juice used and how diluted the wine was when served. Temetum, a sacrificial grade, strong wine from the first pressing, was served undiluted, and was supposedly reserved for men of the Roman elite, and for offerings to the gods. Its name suggests an archaic Etruscan origin; in Rome's distant past, temetum might have been an alcoholic drink brewed from Rowan fruits. Well below that was posca, a mixture of water and sour wine that had not yet turned into vinegar. Less acidic than vinegar, it still retained some of the aromas and texture of wine and was the preferred wine for the rations of Roman soldiers due to its low alcohol levels. Posca's use as soldiers' rations was codified in the Corpus Juris Civilis and amounted to around a liter per day. Still lower in quality was lora (modern-day piquette), which was made by soaking in water for a day the pomace of grape skins already pressed twice, and then pressing a third time. Cato and Varro recommended lora for their slaves. Both posca and lora were the most commonly available wine for the general Roman populace and probably would have been for the most part red wines, since white wine grapes would have been reserved for the upper class.

=== Grape varieties ===
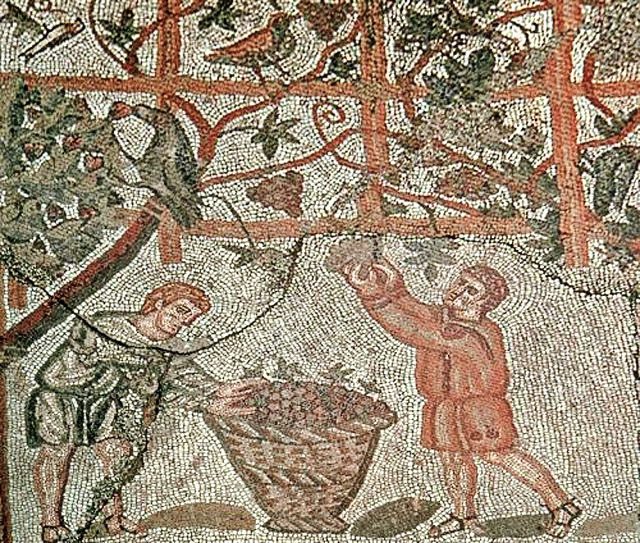
Mosaic depicting the vintage (from Cherchell, present-day Algeria, Roman Africa

The writings of Virgil, Pliny and Columella offer the most detail about the grape varieties used in the production of wine in the Roman empire, many of which have been lost to antiquity. While Virgil's writings often do not distinguish between a wine's name and the grape variety, he made frequent mention of the Aminean grape variety, which Pliny and Columella ranked as the best in the empire. Pliny described five sub-varieties of the grape that produced similar but distinct wines, declaring it to be native to the Italian peninsula. While he claimed that only Democritus knew of every grape variety that existed, he endeavored to speak with authority on the grapes he believed were the only ones worthy of consideration.

Pliny described Nomentan as the second-best wine-producing grape, followed by Apian and its two sub-varieties, which were the preferred grape of Etruria. The only other grapes worthy of his consideration were Greek varieties, including the Graecula grape used to make Chian wine. He remarked that the Eugenia had promise, but only if planted in the Colli Albani region. Columella mentioned many of the same grapes but noted that the same grape produced varied wines in different regions and could even be known under different names, making it hard to track. He encouraged vine growers to experiment with different plantings to find the best for their areas.

Ampelographers debate these descriptions of grapes and their possible modern counterparts or descendants. The Allobrogica grape that was used to produce the Rhone wine of Vienne may have been an early ancestor of the Pinot family. Alternative theories posit that it was more closely related to Syrah or Mondeuse noire—two grapes that produce vastly different wines. The link between these two is the Mondeuse noire synonym of Grosse Syrah. The Rhaetic grape that Virgil praised is believed to be related to the modern Refosco of northeastern Italy.

== Wine in Roman culture ==
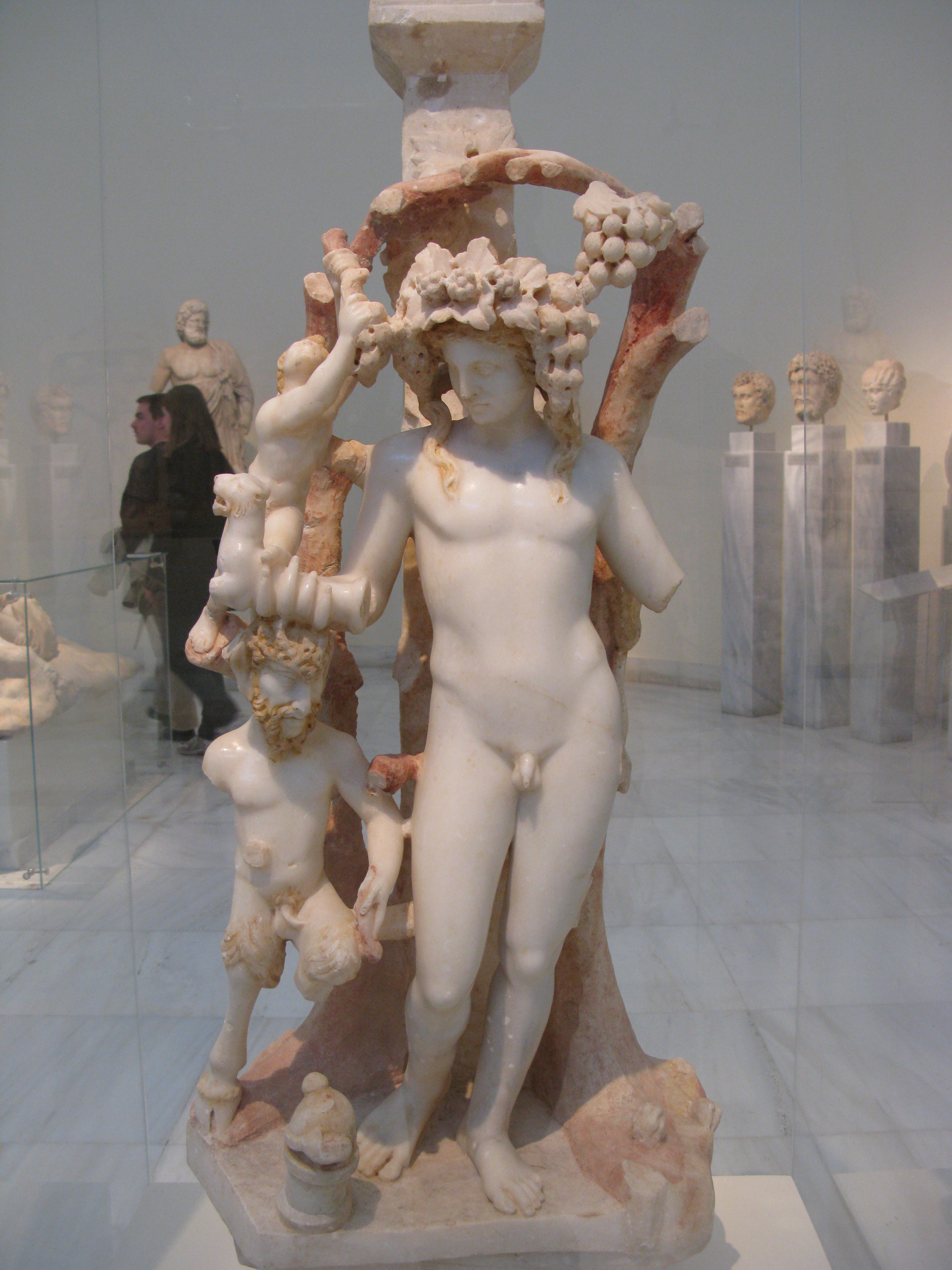
Marble table support adorned by Dionysos, Pan and a Satyr; Dionysos holds a rhyton (drinking vessel) in the shape of a panther, 170–180 AD

In its early years, Rome probably imported wine as a somewhat rare and costly commodity, and its native wine-god, Liber pater, was probably a fairly minor deity. Rome's traditional history has its first king, Romulus, offer the gods libations of milk, not wine, and approve the execution of a wife whose husband caught her drinking wine. The writer Aulus Gellius claims that in those earlier times, women were forbidden to drink wine, "for fear that they might lapse into some disgraceful act. For it is only a step from the intemperance of Liber pater to the forbidden things of Venus". He cites the much respected arch-conservative Cato the elder as his source, but Cato's own writings make no mention of this. The claimed prohibition and the consequences of its subversion have parallels in the myths pertaining to the "Women's goddess" Bona Dea, the nature deities Faunus and Fauna, and the founding of ancient Latium. Modern literature suggests that if there ever was such a prohibition it did not apply to wine and women in general, but to women of the elite classes and "particular types of [strong] wines" used in sacrifice, such as temetum. Women of the elite were expected to set the best possible example of female chastity and purity. Drunkenness could easily lead to adultery, but women who committed adultery could be lawfully punished by fines, loss of dowry or exile, at most.

Wine played a major role in ancient Roman religion and Roman funerary practices, and was the preferred libation for most deities, including one's deified ancestors, whose tombs were sometimes fitted with a permanent, usually stoppered "feeding tube". The invention of wine was usually credited to Liber or his Greek equivalents, Bacchus (later Romanised) and Dionysus, who promoted the fertility of human and animal semen, and the "soft seed" of the vine. Ordinary, everyday, mixed wines were under the protection of Venus, but were considered profane (vinum spurcum), and could therefore not be used in official sacrifice to deities of the Roman State. A sample of pure, undiluted strong wine from the first pressing was offered to Liber/Bacchus, in gratitude for his assistance in its production. The undiluted wine, known as temetum, was customarily reserved for Roman men and Roman gods, particularly Jupiter, king of the gods. It was an essential element of the secretive, nocturnal and exclusively female Bona Dea festival, during which it was freely consumed but referred to euphemistically, as "milk" or "honey". Outside of this context, ordinary wine (that is, Venus' wine) tinctured with myrtle oil was thought particularly suitable for women; myrtle was sacred to Venus.

Venus' long association with wine reflects the inevitable connections between wine, intoxication and sex, expressed in the proverbial phrase sine Cerere et Baccho friget Venus (loosely translated as "without food and wine, Venus freezes"). It was employed in various forms, notably by the Roman playwright, Terence, and well into the Renaissance.

The major public festivals concerning wine production were the two Vinalia. At the Vinalia prima ("first Vinalia") of 23 April, ordinary men and women sampled the previous year's vintage of ordinary wine in Venus' name, while the Roman elite offered a generous libation of wine to Jupiter, in the hope of good weather for the next year's growth. The Vinalia Rustica of 19 August, originally a rustic Latin harvest festival, celebrated the grape harvest, and the growth and fertility of all garden crops; its patron deity may have been Venus, or Jupiter, or both.

Early Roman culture was strongly influenced by the neighbouring Etruscans to the north, and the ancient Greek colonists of Southern Italy (Magna Graecia) both of whom exported wine, and held viticulture in high esteem. Though Rome was still probably very "dry" by Greek standards, Roman attitudes to wine were drastically changed by the establishment and growth of empire. Wine had religious, medicinal and social roles that set it apart from other ingredients of Roman cuisine. Wine might be watered by more than half its volume, possibly for taste or purification. Excessive drinking of undiluted wine was thought barbaric and foolish; on the other hand, undilute wine was thought to be beneficial and "warming" for old men. Throughout Rome's Republican and Imperial eras, the offering of good wine to guests at banquets was a mark of the host's generosity, wealth and prestige.

During the mid-to-later Republic, wine was increasingly treated as a necessity of everyday life rather than simply a luxury enjoyed by the elite. Cato recommended that slaves should have a weekly ration of 5 liters (over a gallon), though this should be sour or otherwise inferior wine. Should slaves become old, or sick and unproductive, Cato advised halving their rations. The widespread planting of grapevines reflects the increase in demand for wine among all classes; the expanding market for wine also reflects an overall change in Roman diets. In the 2nd century BC, Romans began to shift from meals consisting of moist porridge and gruel to those more bread-based; wine aided in eating the drier food.

=== Bacchic cult ===
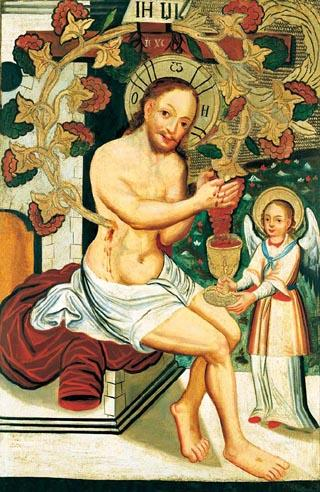
Wine's use in the Christian sacrament of the Eucharist shares similarities with the pagan rites dedicated to Bacchus.

The Bacchanalia were private Roman mystery cults of Bacchus, the Greco-Roman god of wine, freedom, intoxication and ecstasy. They were based on the Greek Dionysia and the Dionysian mysteries, and probably arrived in Rome c. 200 BC from Greek colonies in southern Italy, and Etruria, Rome's northern neighbour. They were originally occasional, women-only affairs, but became increasingly popular and frequent, and were opened to priests and initiates of both genders and all classes; they may have briefly supplanted an existing, lawful cult to Liber. Cult initiates employed music, dance and copious amounts of wine to achieve ecstatic religious possession. The Roman Senate perceived the cult as a threat to its own authority and Roman morality, and suppressed it with extreme ferocity in 186. Of some seven thousand initiates and their leaders, most were put to death. Thereafter the Bacchanalia continued in much diminished form, under the supervision of Rome's religious authorities, and were probably absorbed into Liber's cult. Despite the ban, illicit Bacchanals persisted covertly for many years, particularly in Southern Italy, their likely place of origin.

=== Judaism and Christianity ===
As Rome assimilated more cultures, it encountered peoples from two religions that viewed wine in generally positive terms—Judaism and Christianity. Grapes and wine make frequent literal and allegorical appearances in both the Hebrew and Christian Bibles. In the Torah, grapevines were among the first crops planted after the Great Flood, and in exploring Canaan following the Exodus from Egypt, one of the positive reports about the land was that grapevines were abundant. The Jews under Roman rule accepted wine as part of their daily life, but regarded negatively the excesses that they associated with Roman "impurities".

Many of the Jewish views on wine were adopted by the new Christian sect that emerged in the 1st century AD. One of the first miracles performed by the sect's founder, Jesus, was to have turned water into wine. In addition, the sacrament of the Eucharist prominently involves wine. The Romans drew some parallels between Bacchus and Christ. Both figures possessed narratives strongly featuring the symbolism of life after death: Bacchus in the yearly harvest and dormancy of the grape; and Christ in the death and resurrection story. Eucharist's act of drinking wine as a stand-in for consuming Christ, either metaphysically or metaphorically, echoes the rites performed in festivals dedicated to Bacchus.

The influence and importance of wine in Christianity was undeniable, and soon the Church itself would take the mantle from ancient Rome as the dominant influence in the world of wine for the centuries leading to the Renaissance.

=== Medical uses ===
Romans believed that wine had the power to both heal and harm. Wine was a recommended cure for mental disorders such as depression, memory loss and grief, as well as bodily ailments, from bloating, constipation, diarrhea, gout, and halitosis to snakebites, tapeworms, urinary problems and vertigo.

Cato wrote extensively on the medical uses of wine, including a recipe for a laxative: wine made from grapevines treated with a mixture of ashes, manure and hellebore. He recommended that the flowers of certain plants, e.g. juniper and myrtle, be soaked in wine to help with snakebites and gout. He also believed that a mixture of old wine and juniper, boiled in a lead pot, could aid in urinary issues and that mixing wine with very acidic pomegranates could cure tapeworms.

The 2nd-century CE Greco-Roman physician Galen provided several details concerning wine's medicinal use in later Roman times. In Pergamon, Galen was responsible for the diet and care of the gladiators, and used wine liberally in his practice, boasting that not a single gladiator died in his care. Wine served as an antiseptic for wounds and an analgesic for surgery. When he became Emperor Marcus Aurelius's physician, he developed pharmaceutical concoctions made from wine known as theriacs. Superstitious beliefs concerning theriacs' "miraculous" ability to protect against poisons and cure everything from the plague to mouth sores lasted until the 18th century. In his work De Antidotis, Galen noted the trend in Romans' tastes from thick, sweet wines to lighter, dry wines that were easier to digest.

The Romans were also aware of the negative health effects of drinking wine, particularly the tendency towards "madness" if consumed immoderately. Lucretius warned that wine could provoke a fury in one's soul and lead to quarrels. Seneca the Elder believed that drinking wine magnified the physical and psychological defects of the drinker. Drinking wine in excess was frowned upon and those who imbibed heavily were considered dangerous to society. The Roman politician Cicero frequently labeled his rivals drunkards and a danger to Rome—most notably Mark Antony, who apparently once drank to such excess that he vomited in the Senate.

The ambivalent attitude of the Romans is summarized in an epitaph:

balnea vina Venus
corrumpunt corpora
nostra sed vitam faciunt
balnea vina Venus

"Baths, wine, and sex corrupt our bodies, but baths, wine, and sex make life worth living."

— epitaph of Tiberius Claudius Secundus, CIL VI, 15258,

== See also ==
- Ancient Roman cuisine
- Ancient Greece and wine
- Phoenicians and wine
- Speyer wine bottle
- History of wine
