= Cornelia Ewigleben =

German museum director

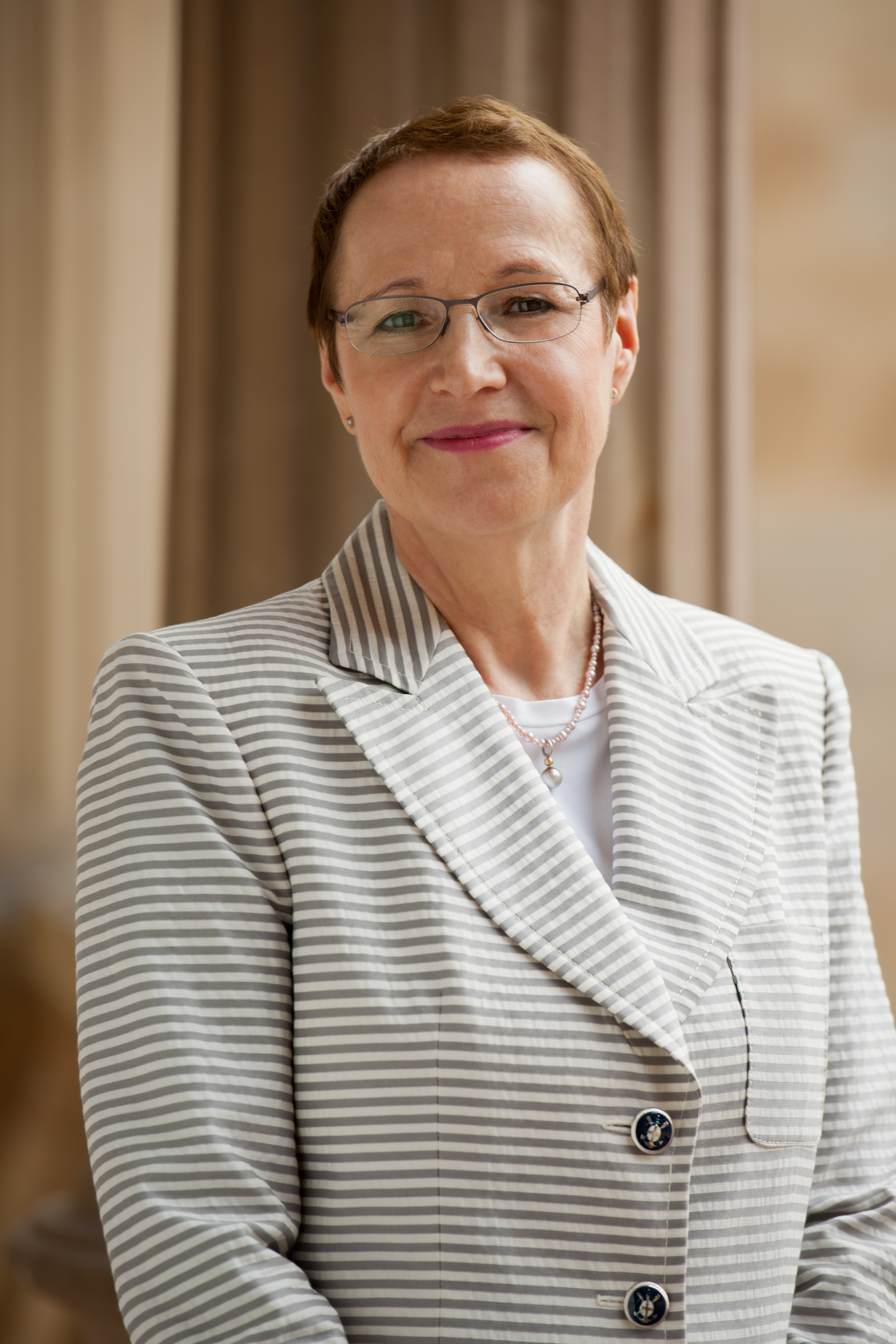
- Ewigleben in 2014
- Born: 1954 (age 71–72); Bispingen, Lower Saxony, Germany

Academic background
- Education: Oxford University; University of Trier

Academic work
- Discipline: Archaeology
- Institutions: Historical Museum of the Palatinate; Landesmuseum Württemberg

Cornelia Ewigleben (born 1954) is a German archaeologist and museum director. An alumna of the universities of Trier and Oxford, she has served as the director of two notable German museums: the Historical Museum of the Palatinate from 2000 to 2005, and the Landesmuseum Württemberg from 2005 to 2020. She also edited a book on the politics of the Roman games (Gladiators and Caesars: The Power of Spectacle in Ancient Rome).

== Life and career ==
Cornelia Ewigleben was born in 1954 in Bispingen, Lower Saxony. She studied classical archaeology at the universities of Trier and Oxford, and was awarded a doctorate for a dissertation on the archaeology of metalworking in Ancient Thrace.

Between 2000 and 2005, she directed the Historical Museum of the Palatinate in Speyer. From 2005 she served as the director of the Landesmuseum Württemberg in Stuttgart. In March 2020, she stepped down from her role at the museum, and was replaced by the sociologist Astrid Pellengahr. She also serves on the academic board of the Oxford Centre for Maritime Archaeology.

== Publications ==
In 2000, Ewigleben and the German archaeologist Eckart Köhne published a conference volume on the politics of the Roman games. The book (Caesaren und Gladiatoren: die Macht der Unterhaltung im antiken Rom) was translated into English as Gladiators and Caesars: The Power of Spectacle in Ancient Rome.
