= Fumarium =

A fumarium was a smoke chamber used in ancient Rome to enhance the flavor of wine through artificially "aging" the wine. Amphorae were placed in the chamber, which was built on top of a heated hearth, in order to impart a smoky flavor in the wine that also seemed to sharpen the acidity. The wine would sometimes come out of the fumarium with a paler color. In his book Vintage: The Story of Wine, Hugh Johnson noted that Pliny the Elder and Columella did not recommend that "first-growth wines" like Falernian, Caecuban, and Alban be smoked.

== Process ==
For preservation, the amphorae were sometimes treated with sulphur dioxide prior to being placed in the fumarium. In his book, The Cyclopedia of Biblical Literature, John Kitto states that the ban on smoked wines as offerings in the Mishna stemmed from the Roman use of sulphur fumes - a uniquely Gentile technique.

== See also ==
- List of smoked foods
