= Historical Museum of the Palatinate =

Coordinates: 49.3155°N 8.4415°E

- Historisches Museum der Pfalz
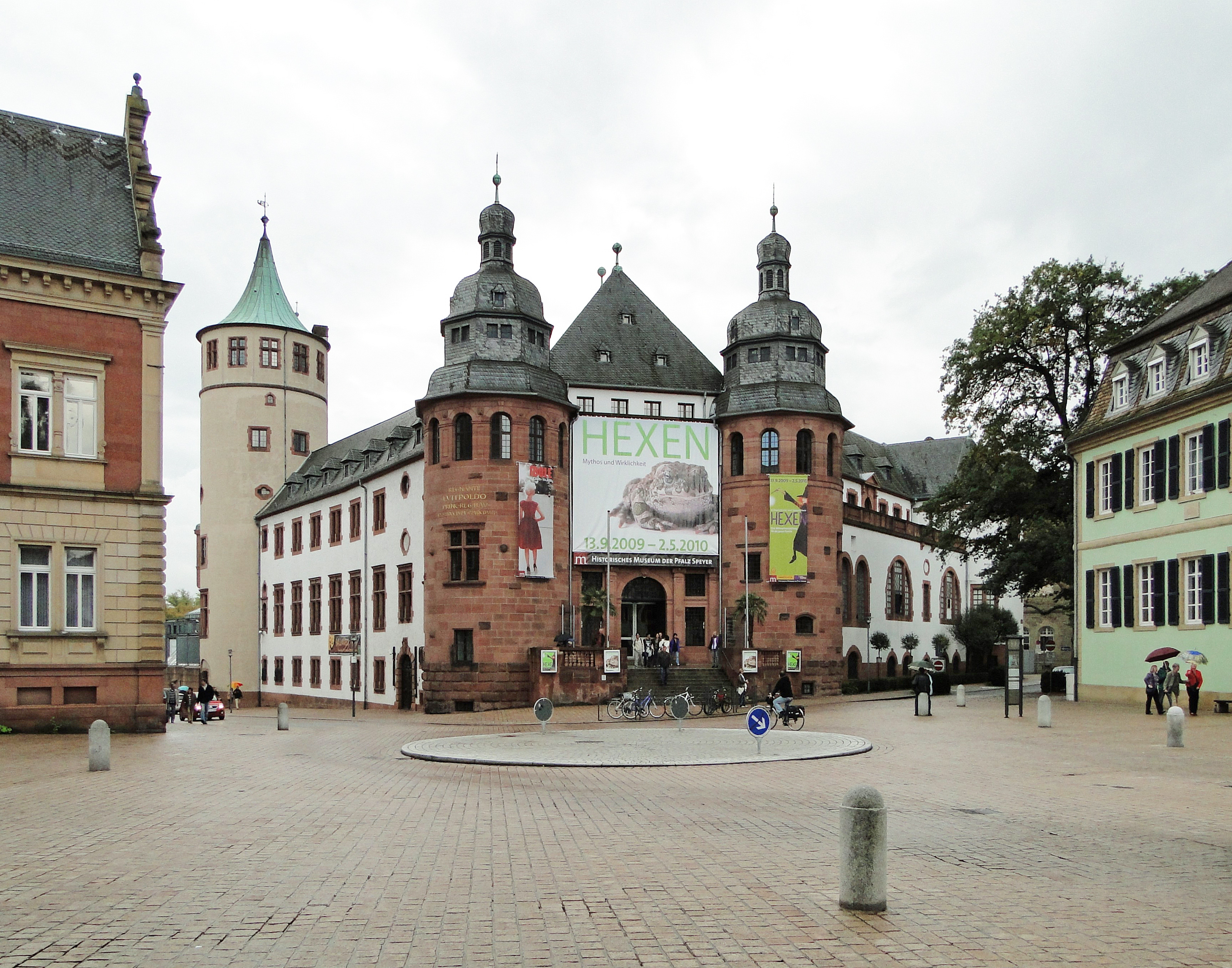
- Museum of the Palatinate – Entrance at the Cathedral Square
- Established: 1869
- Location: Speyer, Rhineland-Palatinate, Germany
- Type: Museum
- Collection size: About 1 million artifacts
- Visitors: 200,000 per year

The Historical Museum of the Palatinate (German: Historisches Museum der Pfalz) is a museum in the city of Speyer in the Palatinate region of the German state of Rhineland-Palatinate. It is situated across the square from the Speyer Cathedral. The museum's focus is on the history of the Palatinate; it has a collection of about 1 million artifacts, the oldest being an approximately 190,000-year-old hand axe. The museum is known for its special exhibitions. With over 200,000 visitors per year it is one of the major attractions of Speyer.

The museum is a trust borne by the City of Speyer, the Evangelical Church of the Palatinate, the Roman Catholic Diocese of Speyer, the State of Rhineland-Palatinate, the Historical Society of the Palatinate and the Bezirksverband Palz (County Association).

== History ==
The museum was established in 1869 when the collections of the Historical Society of the Palatinate, the former Rhine District, and the City of Speyer were combined. The building at the present site was built in 1910 by architect Gabriel von Seidl; a modern annex was added in 1990.

== Exhibitions ==
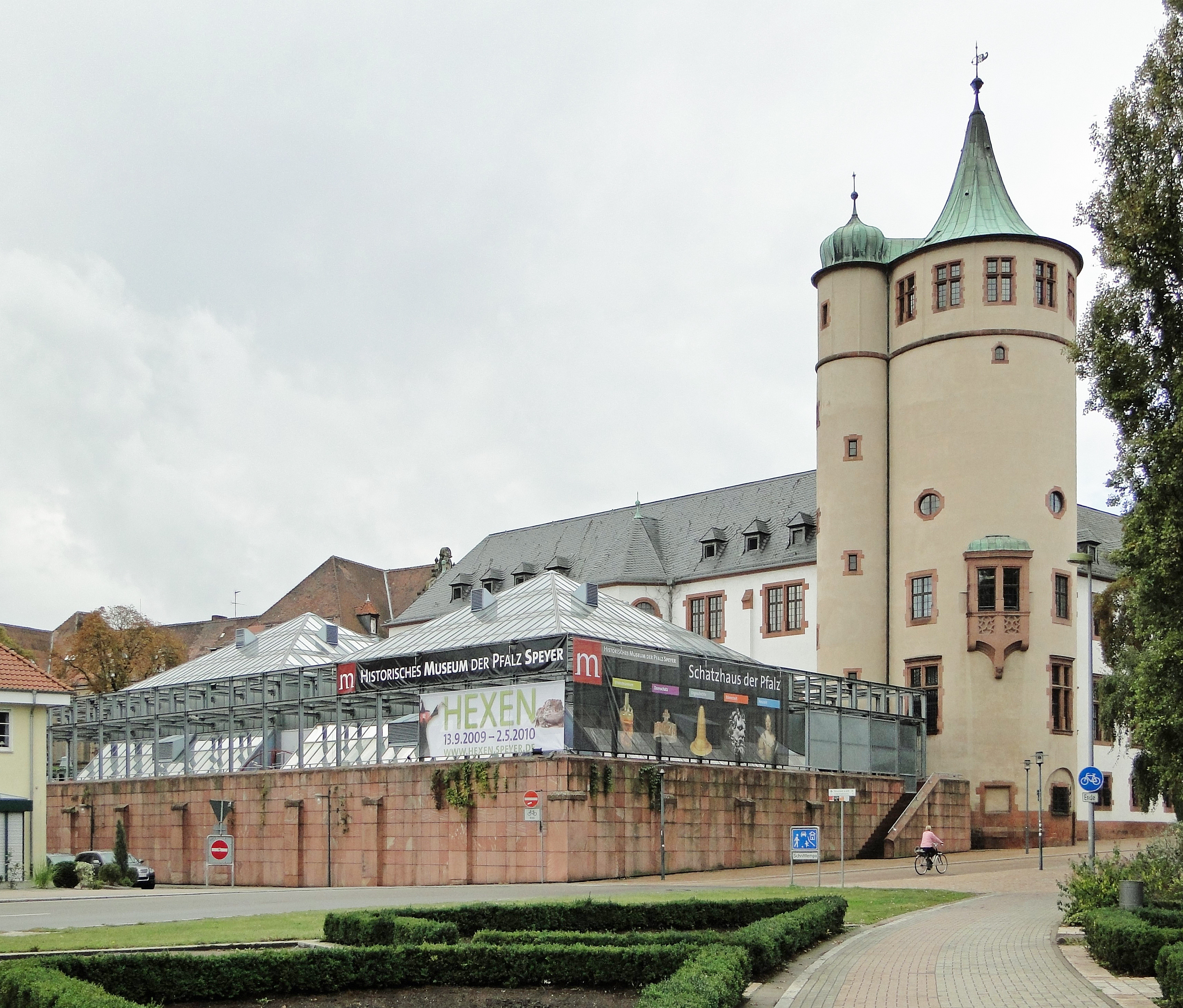
Southeastern side of the Historical Museum of the Palatinate with modern annex

The Museum offers two kinds of exhibitions: permanent and special ones. While the permanent exhibitions focus on the history of the Palatinate, the special ones can have general historical topics.

=== Special exhibitions ===
- "Germany and the World Football Championships since 1954" (2004), on occasion of the 50th anniversary of the World Football Championship 1954
- "Looted and Sunk in the Rhine – The Barbarian’s Treasure of Neupotz" (2006) Over 1,000 pieces of silver, bronze, brass and iron (weapons, tools, coins, tableware, kitchenware etc.), weighing more than 700 kg, sunk in the waters of the Rhine 1,700 years ago, the largest Roman-era trove of metals found in Europe, dug up in a gravel quarry near Neupotz, 30 km south of Speyer.
- "Attila and the Huns" (2007)
- "The Samurai" (2008)
- "The Vikings" (2009)
- "Witches – Myth and Reality" (2010)
- "Amazons – Mysterious Female Warriors" (2010/2011)
- "The Salian Dynasty – Changing Power" (2011)
- "Discovering Egypt’s Treasures – Masterworks from the Egyptian Museum in Turin" (2012)

=== Permanent exhibitions ===
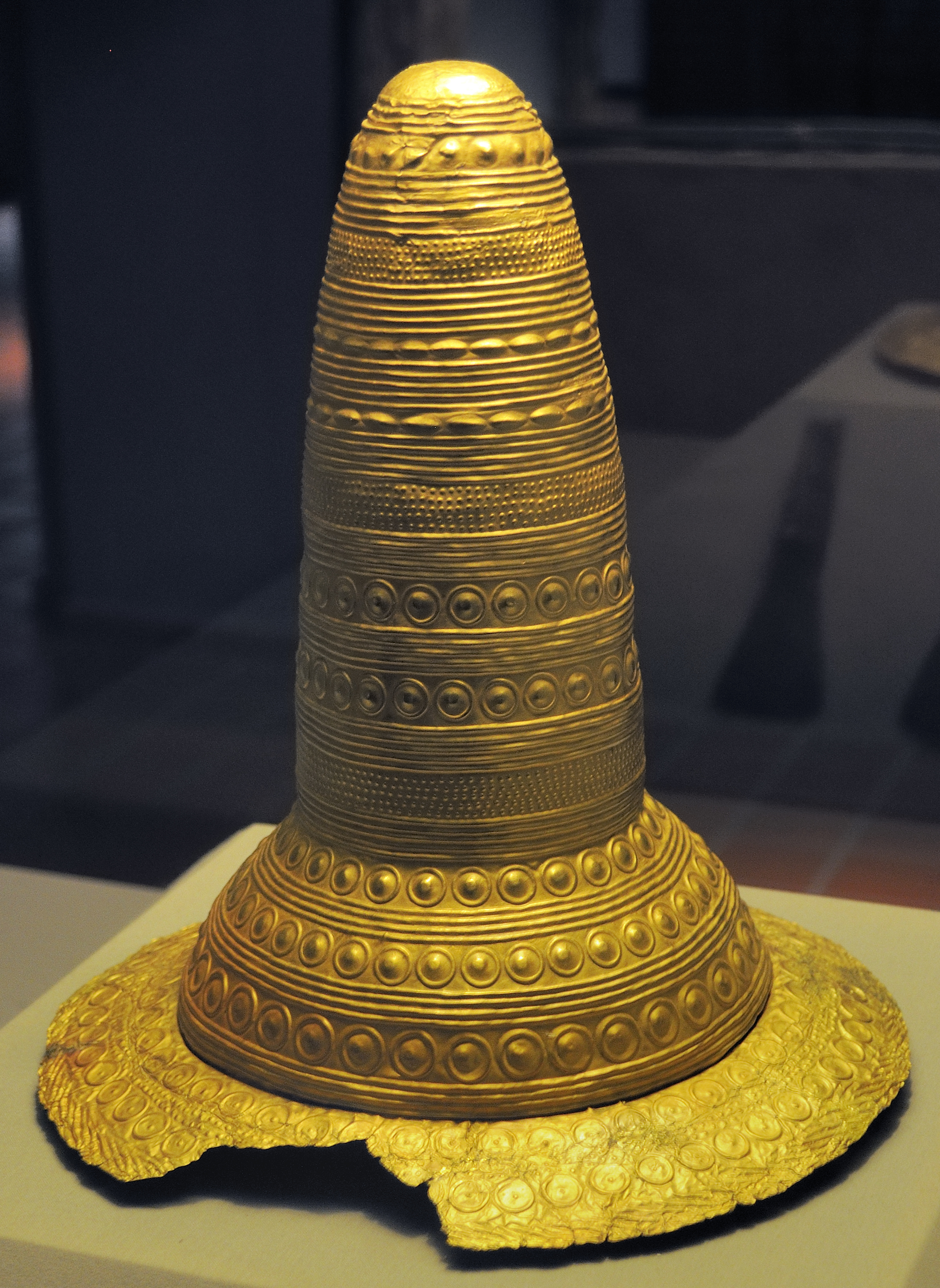
Prehistoric Golden Hat found near Schifferstadt

The five permanent exhibitions covering 8,000 m^{2} are: Prehistory, Roman Era, Cathedral Treasure, Modern Era and the Wine Museum.

- Cathedral Treasure – The cathedral treasure contains the most important testimonies of the Salian Dynasty. One of them is the imperial crown of Conrad II from 1039.
- The Emperor's last clothes – This exhibition shows the restoration and conservation of remnants of clothing found in the imperial and royal graves in the Speyer Cathedral.
- Prehistory – The exhibits show the cultural, social and economical development in the Palatinate beginning from the earliest findings to the eve of the Roman occupation. One of the most prominent exhibits is the Golden Hat of Schifferstadt found near Schifferstadt.
- Roman Era – The Roman Era collection shows findings from the Palatinate, which once was part of the Roman province of Germania Superior (Upper Germany). A special exhibit is the head of a centaur, dating around 10 BC, found in Homburg-Schwarzenacker.
- Modern Era – Information and exhibits from the Renaissance till the end of the Second World War. Highlights are the Frankental China, baroque paintings and precious gowns as well as the German Flag (black-red-gold) flown at the Hambach Festival. There are also paintings by the Speyer painter Anselm Feuerbach.
- Wine Museum – The collection contains unique artifacts from the world of wine, among them the oldest wine ever found, the Speyer wine bottle, dating from the 4th century.
- Evangelical Church of the Palatinate – This exhibition shows the tight connection between the development of the Protestant Church and Palatinate history.

== The Young Museum ==
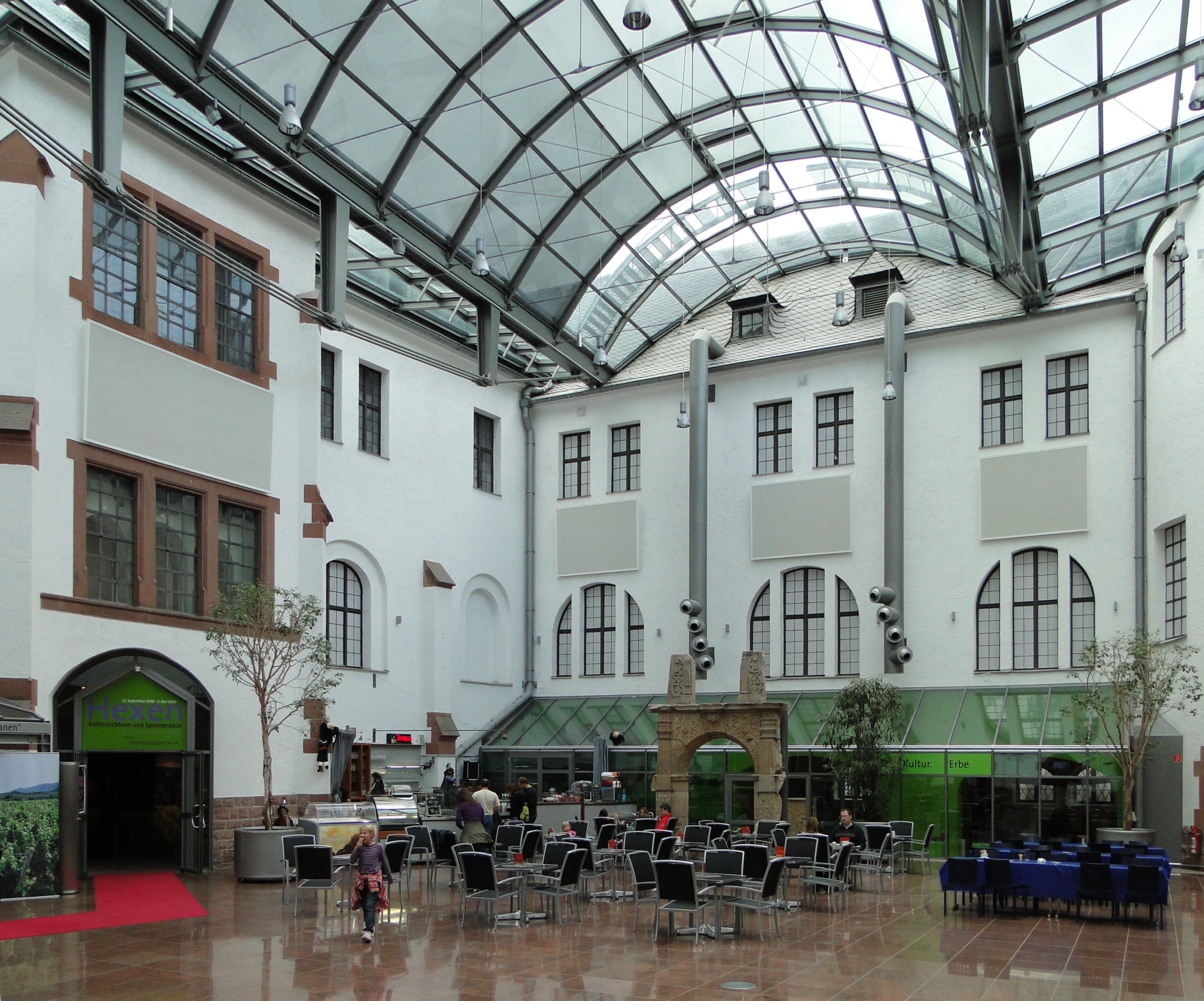
The "Forum" (covered courtyard inside the museum)

The first museum of its kind in Germany, it puts children in touch with history. It offers workshops during school holidays and programmes for school classes.

== The Forum ==
The 650 m^{2}-area of covered courtyard offers opportunities for communication, concerts, workshops, theatre, discussions, etc.
