= Carmona wine urn =

World's oldest surviving wine (1st century CE)

Carmona Wine Urn
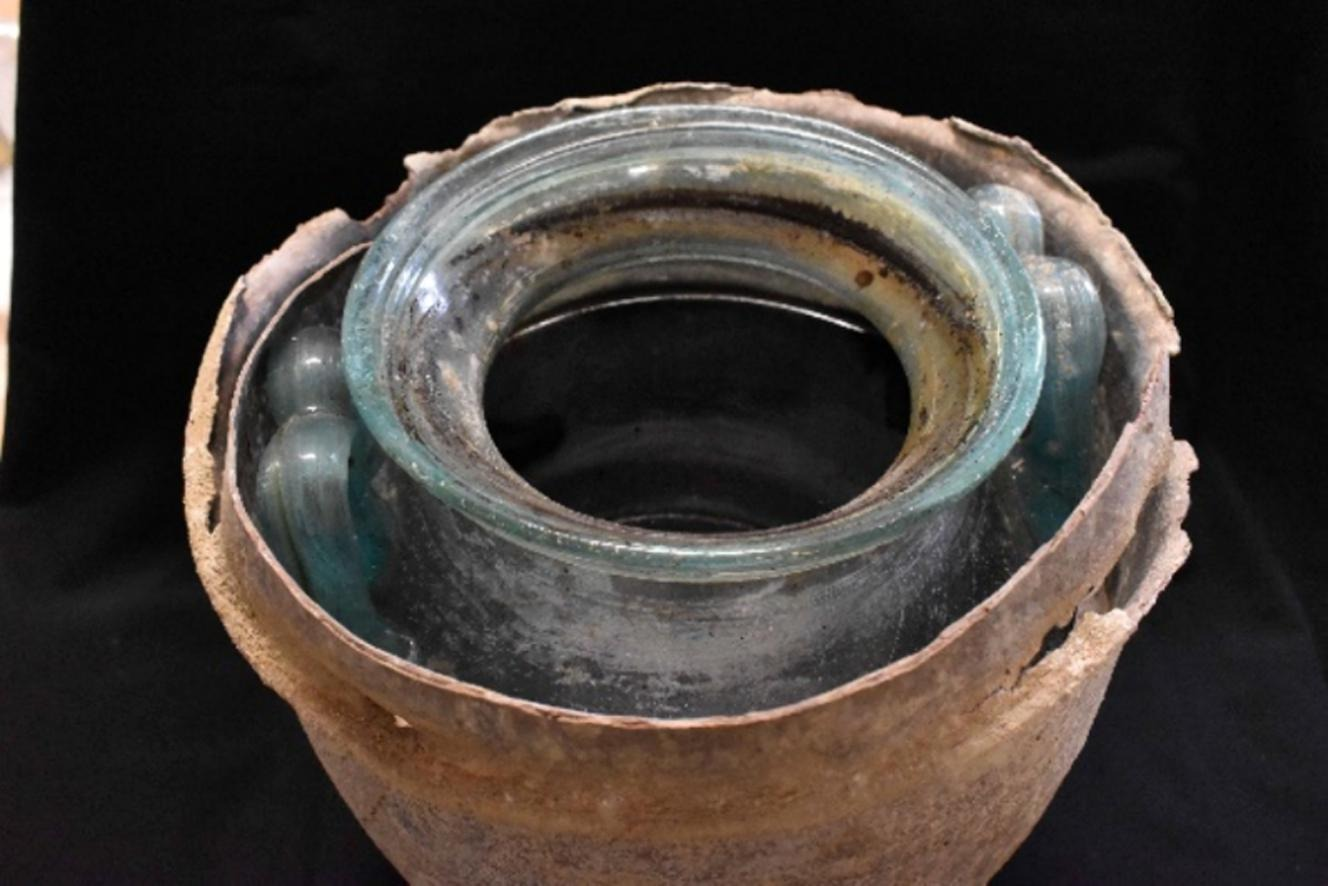
- Material: glass, lead casing, sherry wine, ashes
- Created: 1st century AD
- Discovered: Carmona, Spain
- Culture: Roman Empire

The Carmona wine urn is a first-century Roman glass urn containing intact wine. The urn was discovered in 2019 in Carmona, Spain during excavations of the city's western Roman necropolis. Analysis of the urn's contents five years after its discovery demonstrated the contents to be the oldest surviving liquid wine in the world. This surpasses the previous record holder, the Speyer wine bottle (discovered in 1867), by three centuries.

== Discovery ==
Carmona, known as Carmo during Roman rule, was part of the province of Hispania Baetica. In the first century, agriculturalist Columella wrote of the production of white wine in the locality, as well as that of olive oil and wheat.

In 2019, house renovations at 53 Sevilla Street revealed an access shaft to an unlooted Roman mausoleum measuring 3.29 m long, 1.73 m wide, and 2.41 m high; the chamber contained eight niches with grave goods and the remains of two individuals named Hispanae and Senicio. Niche 8 contained a glass vessel called an olla ossuaria inside of a lead case. The vessel contained five liters of wine mixed with the cremains of the deceased and a gold ring at the bottom.

== Content analysis ==
Roman wine in the Baetic region was often preserved by adding gypsum, cooked musts high in sugar, or salt.

Analysis of mineral salts in the wine revealed a high concentration of potassium salts, indicative of the cremains in the wine, and of silicon, sodium, and aluminium, probably due to two millennia of contact with the glass urn. The wine's mineral content was similar to that of sherry from Jerez de la Frontera and fino from Condado de Huelva and Montilla-Moriles.

Analysis of polyphenols in the wine identified quercetin, 4-hydroxybenzoic acid, apigenin, vanillin, isoquercetin, naringin, and rutin, confirming the liquid's identification as wine. Each of these polyphenols is present in fino produced in Doña Mencía. Although the wine is now reddish, a lack of syringic acid indicated that the wine was originally white wine.
