= 11th-century Byzantine domes =

Most new Byzantine churches in the 11th century were variations of the cross-in-square type, but a new domed octagon type was used in "in relatively large, wealthy buildings in Greece and the region directly influenced by the capital." In Constantinople, drums with twelve or fourteen sides were popular beginning in the 11th century. Middle Byzantine architecture in Constantinople put particular emphasis on the design of the dome and apse, beginning in the 11th century.

== Turkey ==
The 11th century rock-cut churches of Cappadocia, such as Karanlik Kilise and Elmali Kilise in Göreme, have shallow domes without drums due to the dim natural lighting of cave interiors. The rock-cut architecture is characterized by an exaggeration of forms and a multiplication of domes. The church of Yusuf Koç in Göreme (first half of 11th century) was made as an "expanded cross-in-square" with two adjacent central domed bays and two apses, possibly due to a prohibition against having multiple liturgies on the same altar on the same day. The monastic church in Peristrema Valley called Ala Kilise has nine bays with five domes in a cruciform pattern.

In Nicaea, the atrophied Greek cross plan Koimesis church had to have its 6.8 meter diameter dome rebuilt after the earthquake of 1063, the first in a series of earthquakes in the 11th century that required major rebuilding in many cities. The cross-in-square churches now called Eski Imaret and Kilise Camii were likely built in the second half of the 11th century. Eski İmaret Camii, which may have been the katholikon of the Monastery of Christ Pantepoptēs, and the Vefa Kilise Camii (11th or 12th century) included domes over the central bay of their narthexes, which may have indicated imperial patronage.

The Üçayak Byzantine Church may have been built in the second half of the 11th century and had an unusual arrangement of twin domes covering adjacent and connected early atrophied Greek cross plan bays 4.25 meters wide. Remains of the domes themselves were destroyed in an earthquake in 1938. The stylistic details of the building are otherwise similar to the 11th century Byzantine church of Çanlı Kilise. The two domes differed from each other in that the southern dome had eight windows in its drum and the northern dome had four.

Other examples of 11th century cross-in-square churches include Fisandon Kilise in Dere, the Panagia in Kaynarca, .

The Kamariotissa on the island of Chalke has been dated to the end of the 11th century and uses a design that blends features of a domed octagon and a tetraconch.

== Greece ==
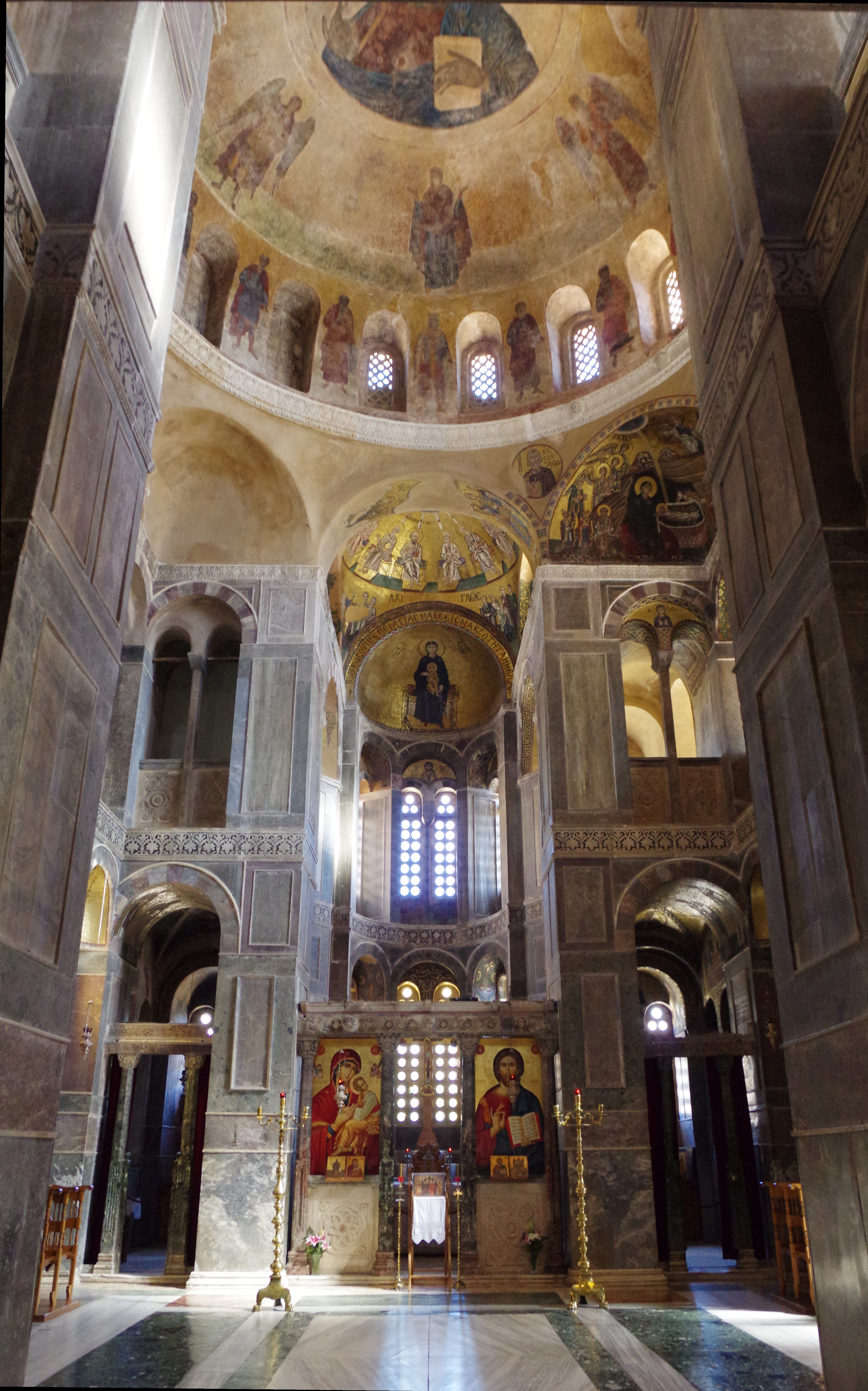
The katholikon of the monastery of Hosios Loukas near Distomo, Greece

The domed-octagon plan is a variant of the cross-in-square plan. The earliest extant example is the katholikon at the monastery of Hosios Loukas, with a 9-meter (30 ft) wide dome built in the first half of the 11th century. This hemispherical dome was built without a drum and supported by a remarkably open structural system, with the weight of the dome distributed on eight piers, rather than four, and corbelling used to avoid concentrating weight on their corners. The use of squinches to transition from those eight supports to the base of the dome has led to speculation of a design origin in Arab, Sasanian, or Caucasian architecture, although with a Byzantine interpretation. Similar openness in design was used in the earlier Myrelaion church, as originally built, but the katholikon of Hosios Loukas is perhaps the most sophisticated design since the Hagia Sophia. The smaller monastic church at Daphni, c. 1080, uses a simpler version of this plan.

The katholikon of Nea Moni, a monastery on the island of Chios, was built some time between 1042 and 1055 and featured a nine sided, ribbed dome rising 15.62 meters (51.2 ft) above the floor (this collapsed in 1881 and was replaced with the slightly taller present version). The transition from the square naos to the round base of the drum is accomplished by eight conches, with those above the flat sides of the naos being relatively shallow and those in the corners of the being relatively narrow. The novelty of this technique in Byzantine architecture has led to it being dubbed the "island octagon" type, in contrast to the "mainland octagon" type of Hosios Loukas. Speculation on design influences have ranged from Arab influence transmitted via the recently built domed octagon chapels at the Church of the Holy Sepulchre in Jerusalem or the Al-Hakim Mosque in Islamic Cairo, to Caucasian buildings such as the Armenian Cathedral of the Holy Cross. Later copies of the Nea Moni, with alterations, include the churches of Agios Georgios Sykousis, Agioi Apostoli at Pyrghi, Panagia Krina, and the Church of the Metamorphosis in Chortiatis. The domed octagon church of Nea Moni was reported in a synaxarium of its two founders to have been based on a "small church of the Holy Apostles" in Constantinople, about which little is known. It was an imperial foundation with an octaconch layout, although the niches on the main axes are very shallow to not extend through the walls.

The original katholikon of the Monastery of Zoodochos Pege was a domed cross-in-square from the 11th century. It was destroyed in the 19th century. The domed narthex of this church was added in the 12th or 13th centuries and converted into a church in 1890.

Other examples of 11th century cross-in-square churches include the katholicon of Petraki Monastery, the Thessarakonta chapel at Lavra monastery, the Koimēsēs church at Chōnikas, the katholikon of Agia Monē in Aria, the Panagia Episkopi on Santorini, Church of Saint George Diasoritis on Naxos, Agia Theodōroi in Athens, Panagia Zerbiōtissa in Stylos, Church of Panagia Protothronos on Naxos, Agia Mamas on Naxos, Agia Asōmatioi in Athens, Agioi Theodoroi in Vamvaka, and the church of Christos in Partira.

== Southern Italy ==
Examples of 11th century cross-in-square churches include the Cattolica di Stilo, San Marco in Rossano, and the Church of Saint Peter in Otranto.

== Cyprus ==
Examples of 11th century cross-in-square churches include Agia Ērakleidios in Kalopanagiotis and the Aagia Nikolaos tēs Stegēs in Kakopetria.

== Bulgaria ==
An example of an 11th century cross-in-square church is the Church of Saint John the Baptist in Nesebar.

== North Macedonia ==
An example of an 11th century cross-in-square church is Sv. Leontij in Vodoča (older and newer).

== Albania ==
An example of an 11th century cross-in-square church is Shēn Mērisē in Sipērme.

== See also ==
- List of Roman domes
- History of architecture
