= Mastichodendro =

Cultivated variety of tree

- Genus: Pistacia
- Species: Pistacia lentiscus
- Cultivar: 'Chia'

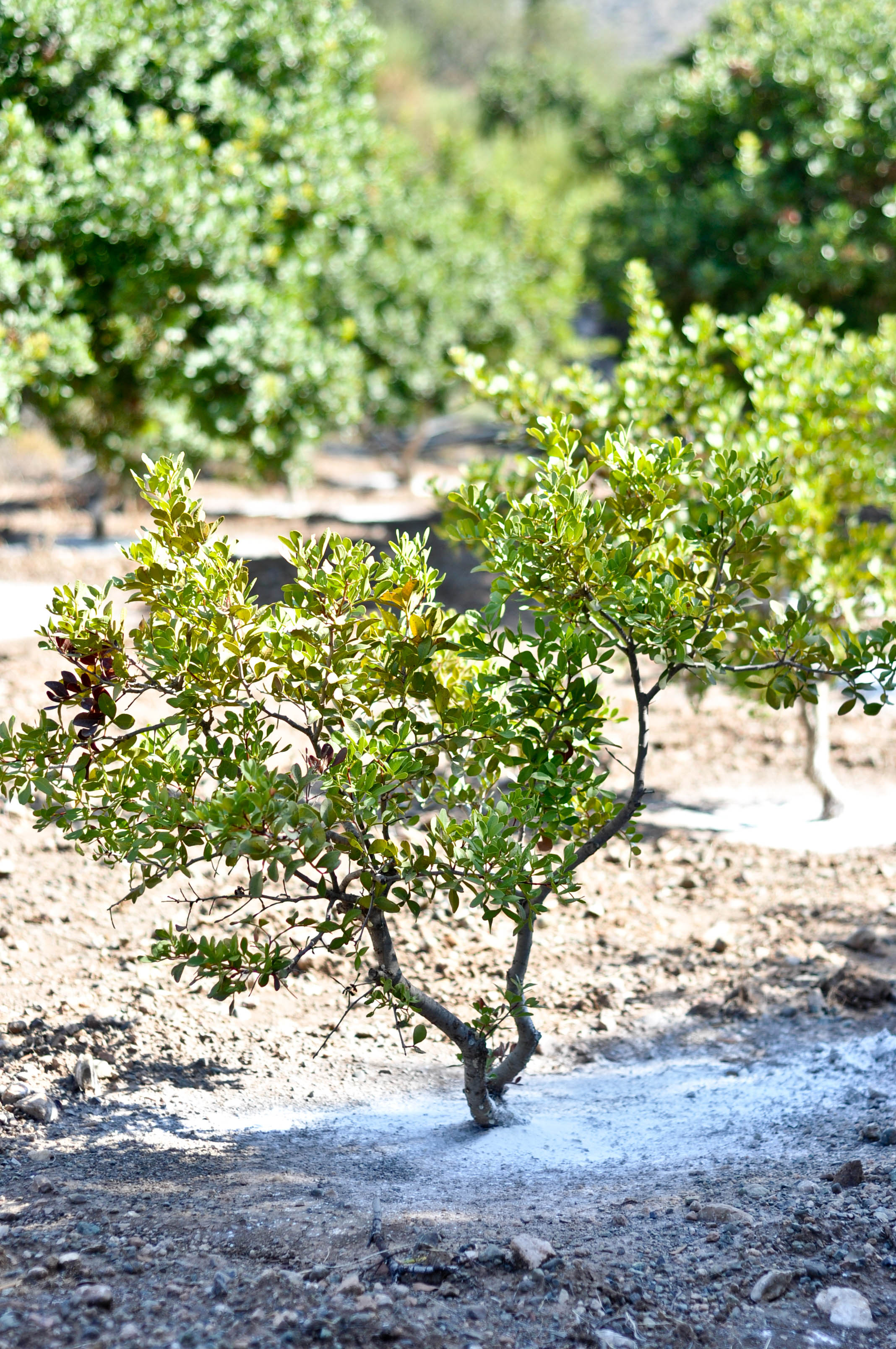
Young mastic tree

The Mastichodendro (Pistacia lentiscus 'Chia'), sometimes called the Mastic Tree of Chios, Pixari or Chian lentisk, is a cultivated variety of the Mastic tree or the Lentisk (Pistacia lentiscus L.). The Mastichodendro is found only on the southern quarter of the Greek island of Chios, in a series of 24 villages called "Mastichochoria". The Mastichodendro can also be found on certain areas near Cesme and Alacati in Turkey, though it's not extensively cultivated.

The Mastichodendro can reach a height of a few meters and lives up to several decades. In Chios, it is widely prized for its resin, called Mastic (Greek: Μαστίχα). Mastic is widely used in traditional medicine and food, especially desserts. The resin is also made into chewing gums and is thought to be among the first chewing gums ever invented. The resin is harvested by scratching "wounds" on the tree's trunk and branches. This triggers the resin production which is released as a liquid and hardens through optimal conditions. The resin and some of its by-products has been granted PDO status by the European Union, while the know-how of the cultivation is part of UNESCO's intangible cultural heritage.

Although wild lentisks are scattered around the Mediterranean region, the specific variety that is commercially produced is indigenous to Chios. In the past, there have been attempts to cultivate the tree outside of Mastichochoria, in regions such as Italy, Turkey, and even the rest of the island, but without any success. This has attributed to the region's local microclimate and geology, as well as the good care by the local producers. Additionally, the tree might have been domesticated.

The Mastichodendro, also has certain clones, such as Mavroskinos, Votomos, Kallimasiotis, Livanos, Krementinos etc. Male trees are usually cultivated.

== See also ==
- Chios
- Traditional medicine
