= Mesta, Greece =

Mesta Μεστά
- Community
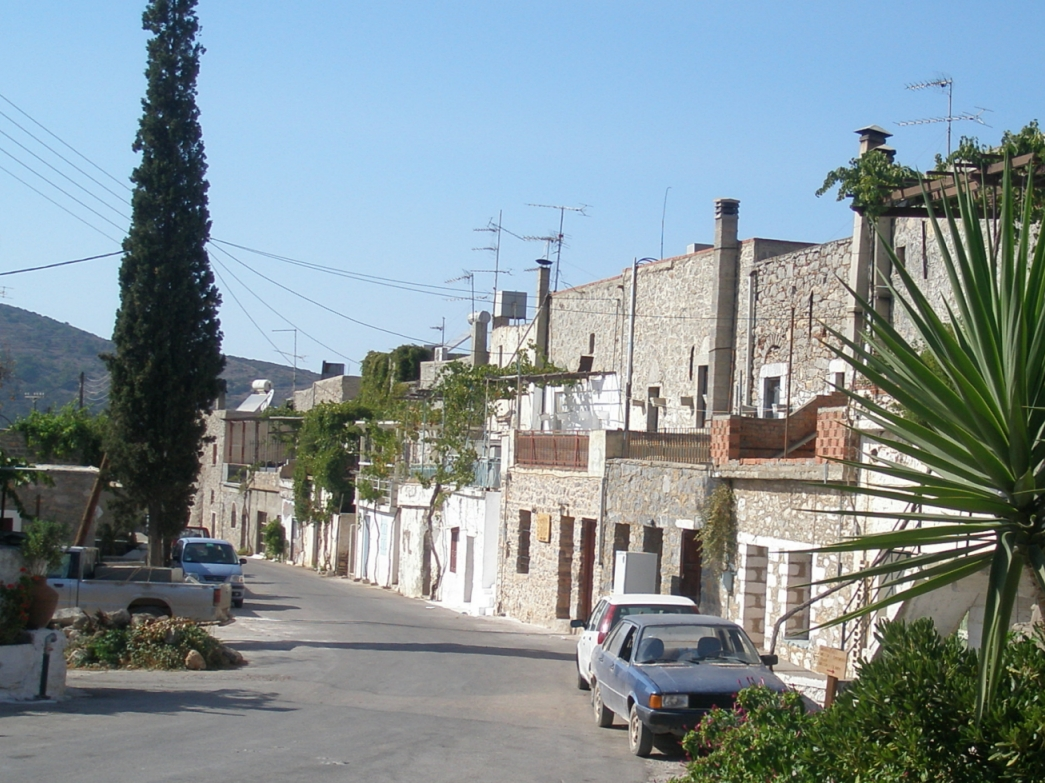
- The outside of the village

- Location within Greece
- Coordinates: 38°15′N 25°55′E
- Country: Greece
- Administrative region: North Aegean
- Regional unit: Chios
- Municipality: Chios
- Municipal unit: Mastichochoria
- Elevation: 120 m (390 ft)

Population (2021)
  - Community: 356
- Time zone: UTC+2 (EET)
  - Summer (DST): UTC+3 (EEST)
- Postal code: 821 00
- Area code: 22710
- Vehicle registration: ΧΙ

Mesta is a traditional Greek village on the island of Chios. It is one of the Mastic Villages, a group of villages in South Chios where the main activity is the manufacture of mastic. The mastic villages have been added to the representative List of the Intangible Cultural Heritage of Humanity of UNESCO.Mesta is characterised by particular architecture since it is a village-castle with perfectly preserved medieval architecture. Mesta is 35 km south west of Chios (town), and 4 km from the coast, at an elevation of 120m. It is part of Mastichochoria municipality in the southwest of Chios, which also includes the small port of Limenas.

== History ==
The village was probably built in the 12th century during the Byzantine era. Its narrow laberynthine streets and pentagonal fortified perimeter repelled pirate raids. The fortifications were reinforced during the Genoese era in Chios, between 1346 and 1566. The church of the Older Taxiarchi in the centre of the village was built in 1794. Many villagers were killed or captured during the Chios massacre, but some were later released because the mastic agriculture was important for the Ottomans.

=== Historical population ===
Census	Settlement	Community
1991	337	
2001	501	565
2011	337	437
2021	293	356

== Gallery ==
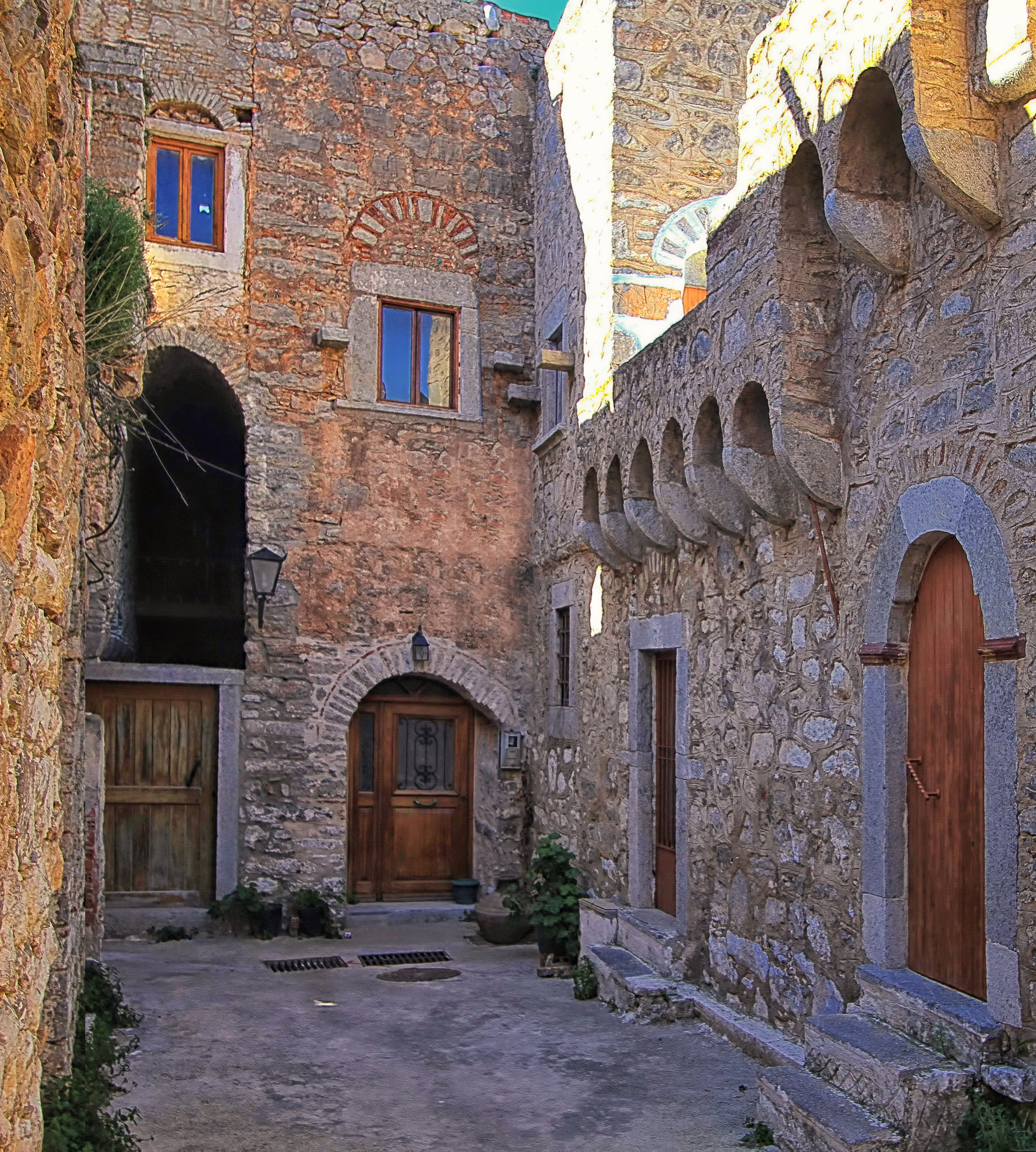
View

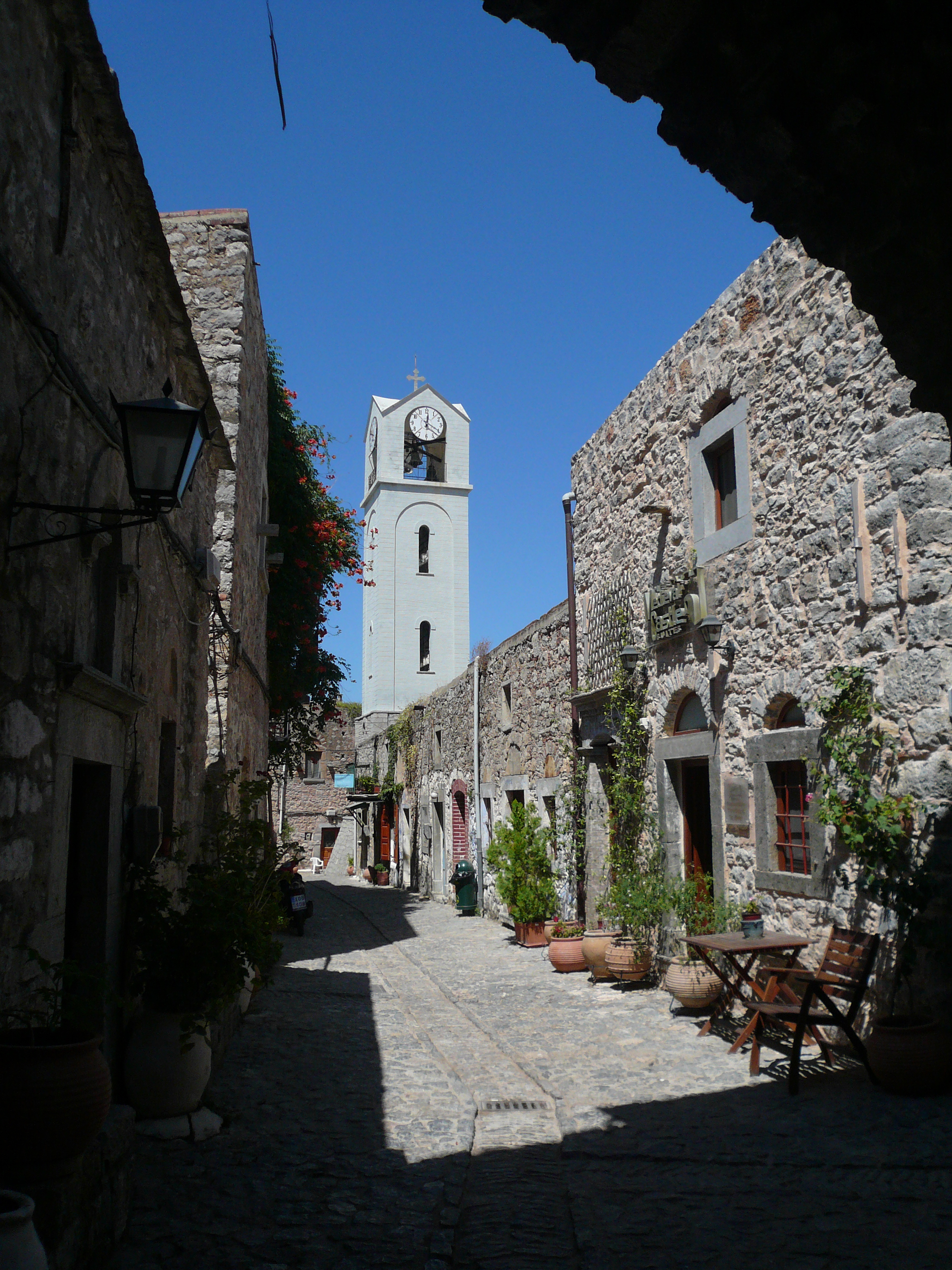
Megalos Taxiarchis belltower

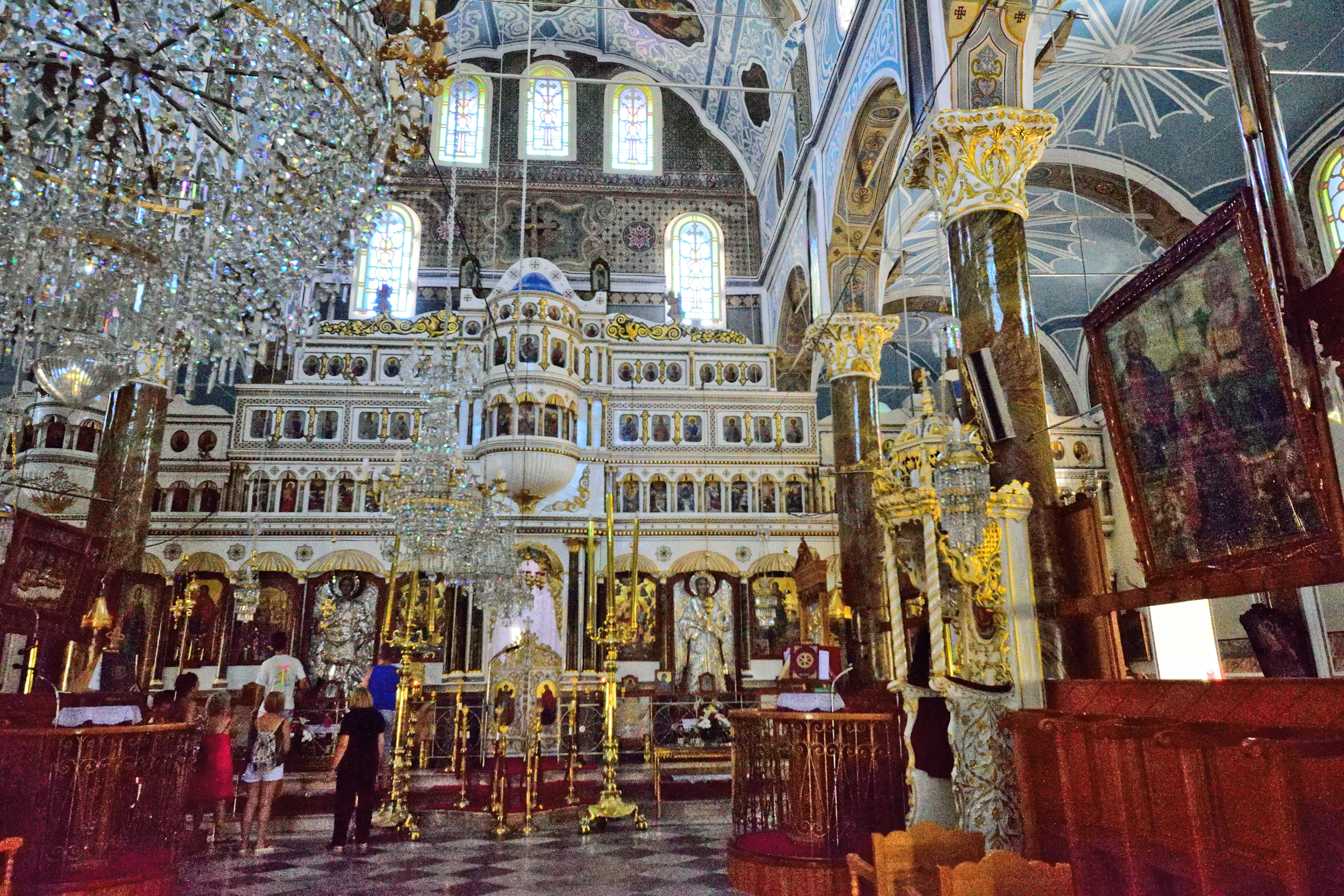
Interior of Taxiarchis church

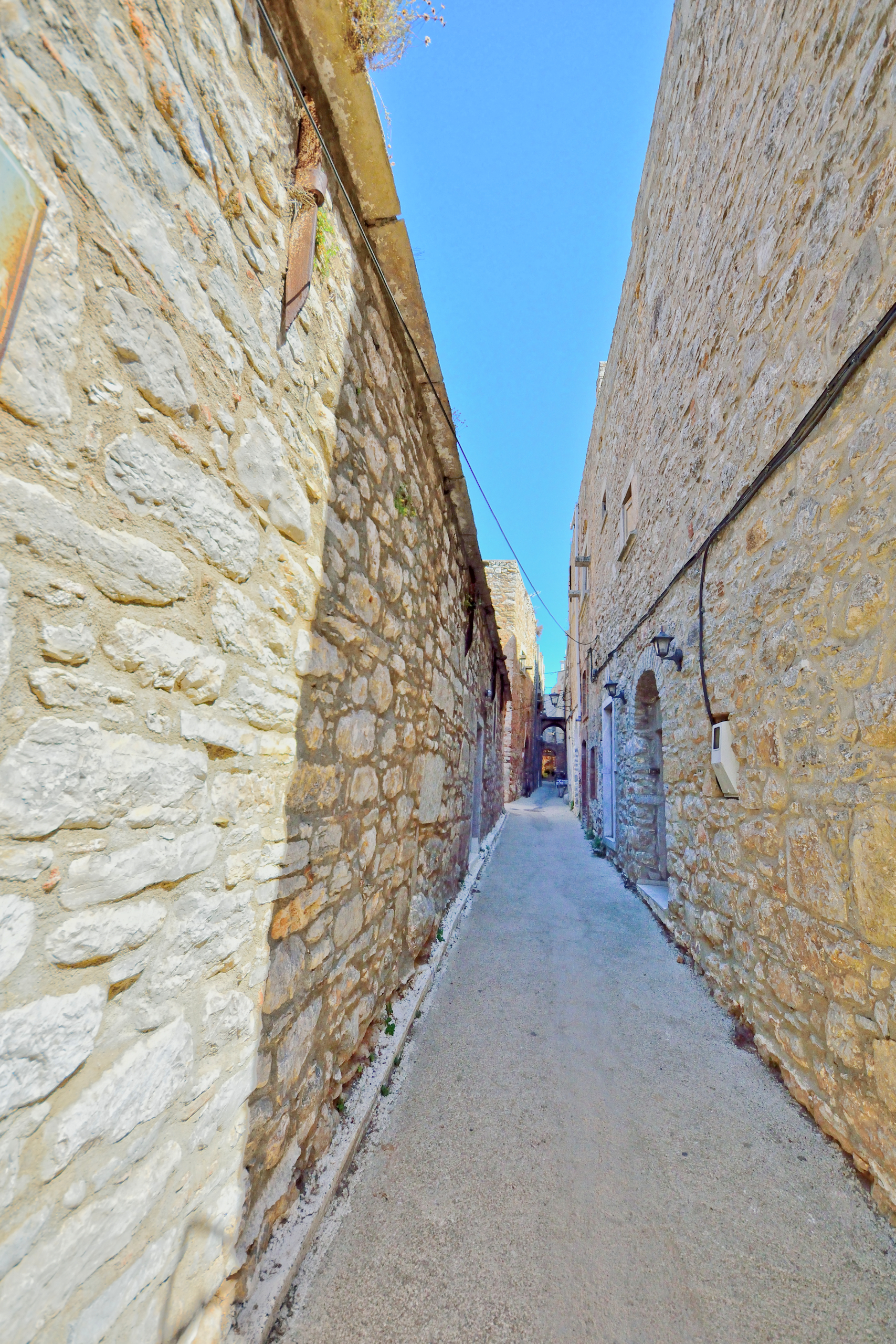
A road of the village

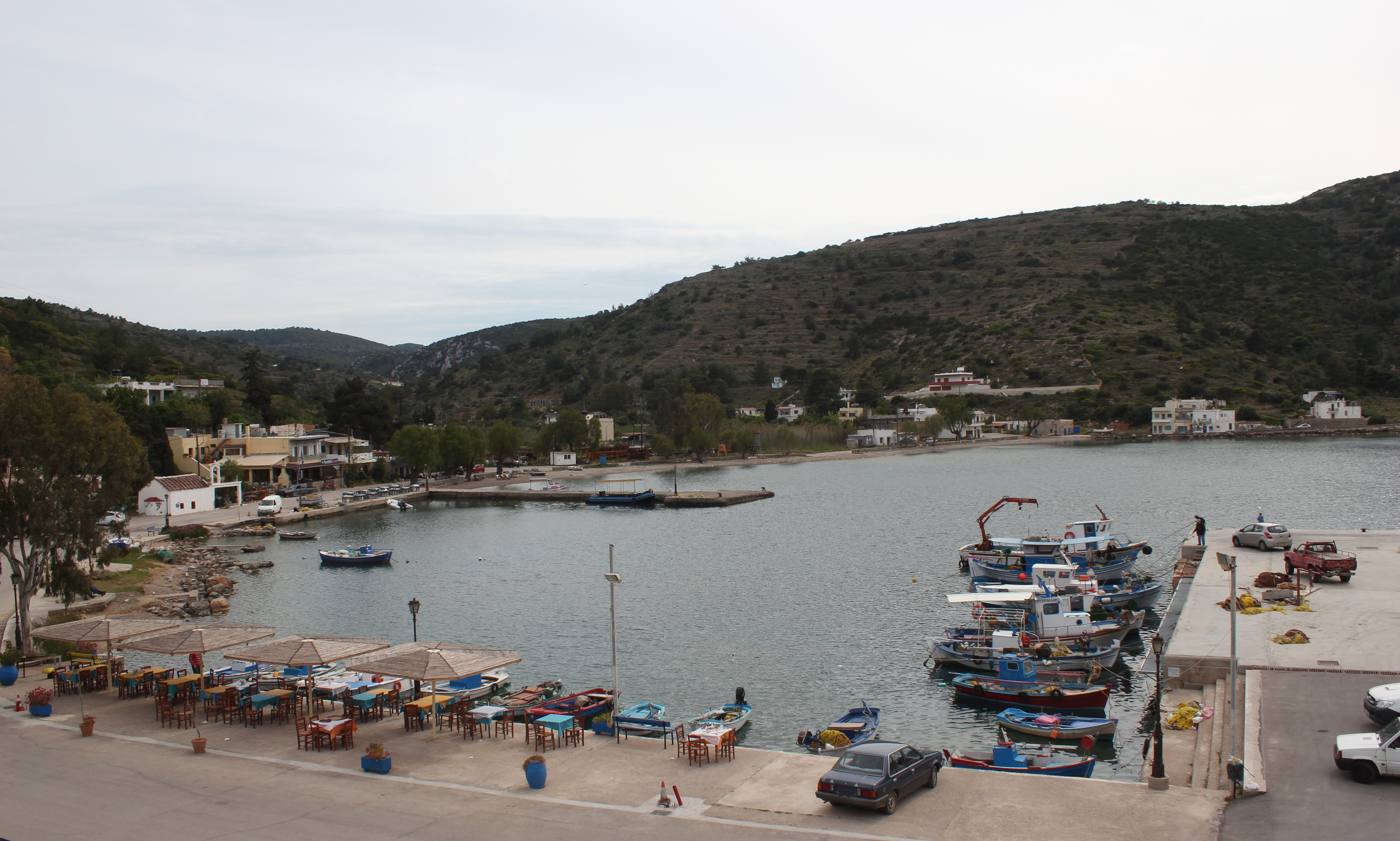
The port of Mesta (Limenas)
