= Panagia Krina, Chios =

Panagia Krina
- Παναγία η Κρίνα
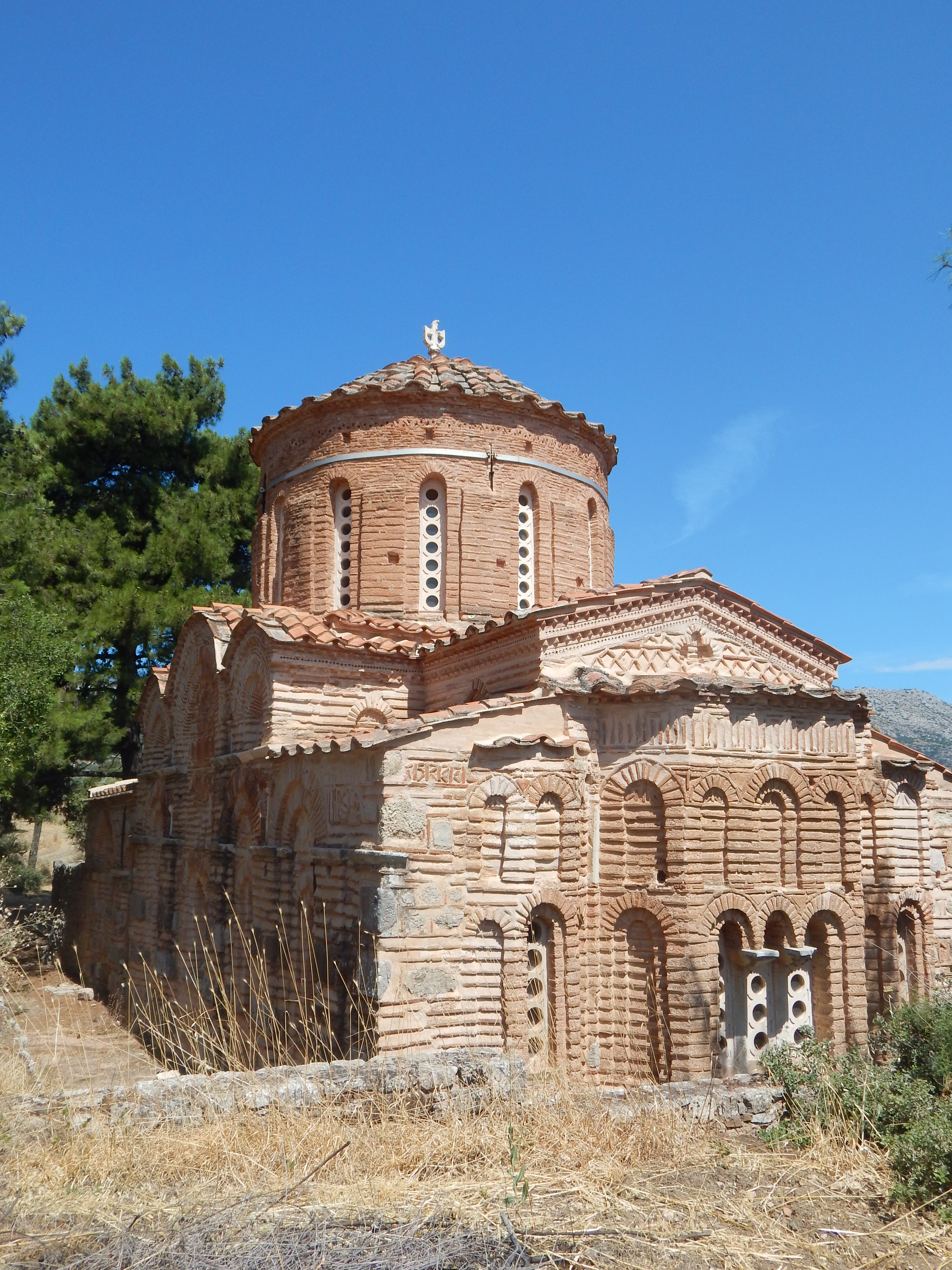

- 38°18′58″N 26°4′55″E
- Location: Vaviloi, Chios
- Country: Greece
- Language: Greek
- Denomination: Greek Orthodox

History
- Status: Open

Architecture
- Completed: 1287

Administration
- Metropolis: Metropolis of Chios, Psara and Oinousses

The Panagia Krina (Greek: Παναγία η Κρίνα) is a Byzantine temple, located between Sklavia and Vavyls, in Greece. It is one of the few individual local copies of the catholicon of the New Monastery of Chios.

== History ==
The timing of the construction of the temple is uncertain. The written date 1287 on the southern arcosolium may have been related to the construction of the temple. The beginning of the 13th or the end of the 12th centuries constitute the possible construction periods of the temple. An inscription on the iconostasis of the island of Paros Mau(or)l o k [...]+etous, stf[..] may refer to its abbot named Manuel but his relationship with Paros is uncertain.

The first two letters of the number of years from the creation of the world are f and f. This implies that the date can range between the years 6500 and 6599, that is, from 992 to 1091 AD. Since the Krina is a copy of the catholicon of the New Monastery, the construction of the iconostasis and the construction of the church appear to have been 1056–1091. In the exonarthex an inscription by Ioa.keim monk I and abbot 1ZMZ is probably 1747, which means that the construction of the later exonartix came later and that until then Krina was a functioning monastery.

== Sources ==
- Χαράλαμπος Μπούρας, «Αλληγορική παράσταση του βίου -καιρού σε μια βυζαντινή τοιχογραφία στη Χίο», Αρχαιολογικόν Δελτίον, τομ. 21 Α (1967), σελ.26-34
- Χαράλαμπος Μπούρας, Χίος, εκδ. Εθνική Τράπεζα της Ελλάδος, Αθήναι, 1974
- Χαράλαμπος Μπούρας,«Το τέμπλο της Παναγίας Κρίνας και η χρονολόγησή της», Δελτίον της Χριστιανικής Αρχαιολογικής Εταιρείας, περίοδος Δ΄, τομ.10 (1980–1981),σελ.165-180
- Γεώργιος Σωτηρίου,«Κυρίως βυζαντιακά μνημεία Χίου», Αρχαιολογικόν Δελτίον,Παράρτημα του Αρχαιολογικού Δελτίου, τομ.2 (1916) σελ.30-39

== Bibliography ==
- Γ. Μαστορόπουλος, «Παρατηρήσεις σε μία οικοδομική φάση της Παναγίας Κρίνας Χίου», Αρχαιολογικόν Δελτίον,τομ 34 (1979) [1986] Α΄ Μελέτες,σελ. 260–263,
- Ch. Pennas, «Some Aristocratic Founders: the Foundation of Panagia Krena on Chios», in Women and Byzantine Monasticism, ed. J. Y. Perreault ... Middle Byzantine Churches," JSAH, τομ. 36 (1977) σελ.94-110
- Charalampos Pennas, The Byzantine church of Panagia Krena in Chios : history, architecture, sculpture, painting (late 12th century),Leiden : Alexandros Press, 2017
- Charalampos Pennas,«An Unusual "Deesis" in the Narthex of Panagia Krena,Chios», Δελτίον της Χριστιανικής Αρχαιολογικής Εταιρείας, περίοδος Δ΄, τομ. 17 (1993–1994), σελ.193-198
