= Pyrgi, Greece =

Pyrgi Πυργί
- Community
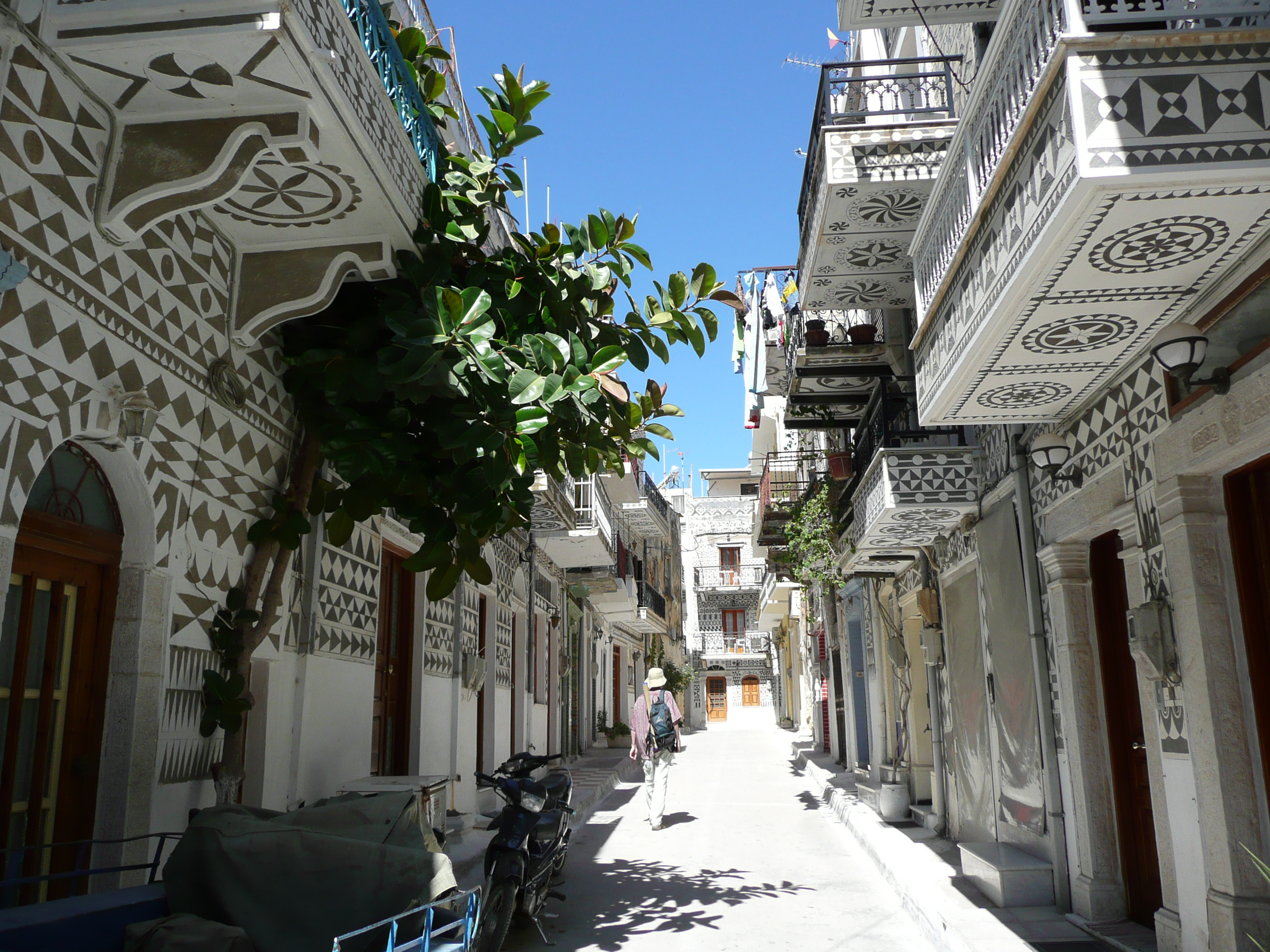
- Street of Pyrgì

- Location within Greece
- Coordinates: 38°13′N 25°59′E
- Country: Greece
- Administrative region: North Aegean
- Regional unit: Chios
- Municipality: Chios
- Municipal unit: Mastichochoria
- Elevation: 110 m (360 ft)

Population (2021)
  - Community: 1,063
- Time zone: UTC+2 (EET)
  - Summer (DST): UTC+3 (EEST)
- Postal code: 821 00
- Area code: 22710
- Vehicle registration: ΧΙ

Pyrgi (Greek: Πυργί, Greek pronunciation: [pirˈʝi]) is a village on the Greek island of Chios, known as the "painted village" on account of the decoration of the houses. This mostly consists of black and white decorative motifs in different shapes. Pyrgi is one of the biggest villages in Chios, located in the south part of the island, 25 km south of the island's capital. It is the traditional seat of the Mastic Villages, a group of villages where the residents engage with mastic agriculture. These villages have been added in representative List of the Intangible Cultural Heritage of Humanity of UNESCO. The population of Pyrgi is 1,063 inhabitants according to the 2021 census.

cleaning mastic tears in Pyrgi

== Description ==
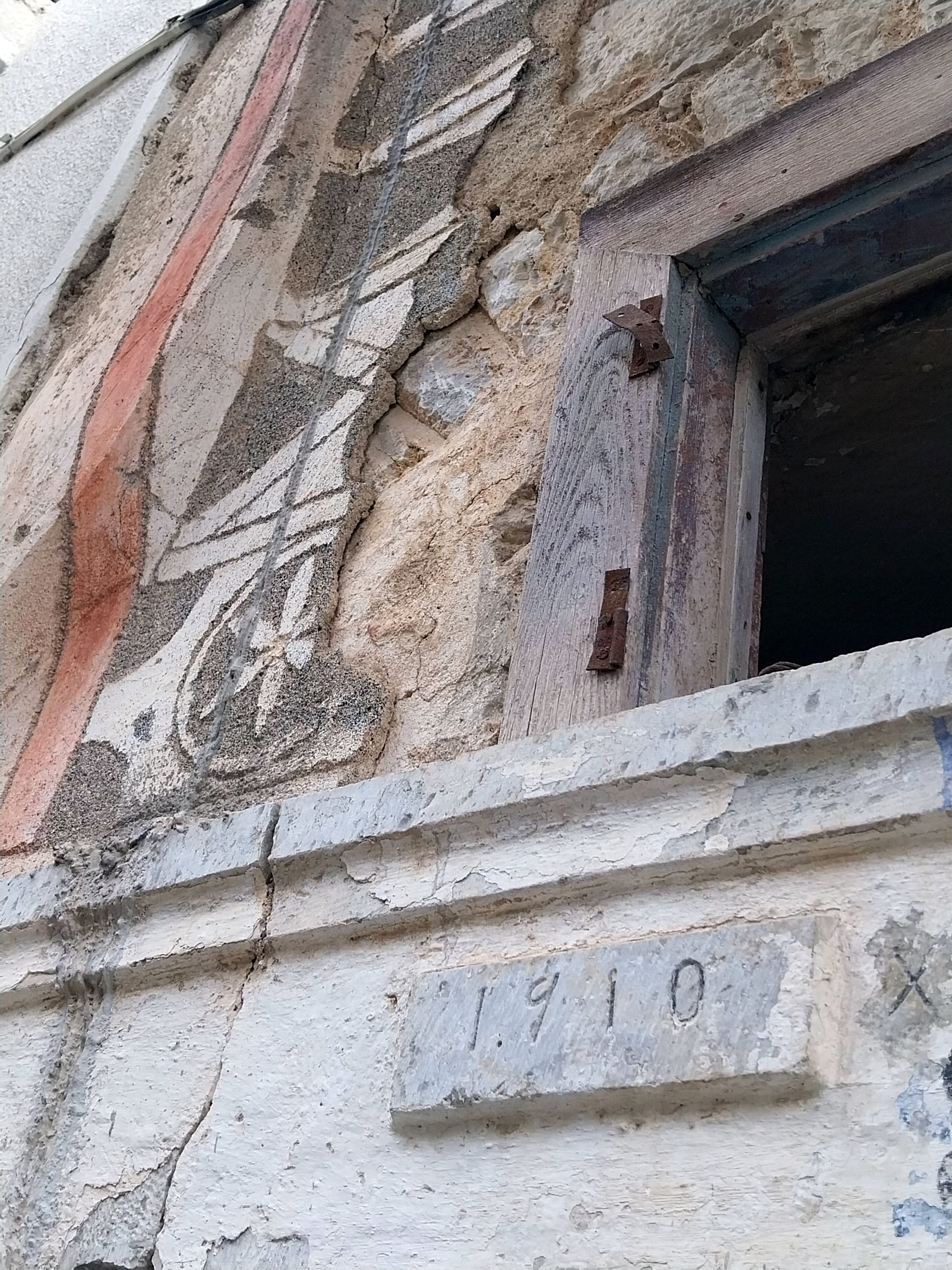
Layers of 1910 Sgraffito

Pyrgi still keeps the medieval style. The settlement's roads are narrow and are covered with arches or vaults. In the middle of the village there is a tower with a height of 18 meters. Around it, there are walls with four towers in the corners. In the village, there are three old churches, Agioi Apostoloi (the older church, built probably during 15th century), Koimisis Theotokou and Taxiarchis. The village stands out from the other mastic villages because its houses are worked with decorative motifs in different shapes. The decorative motifs in the facade of the houses are called "Xistà".

== Geography ==
A kind of white dirt found near Pyrgi was famed as an astringent and cosmetic since antiquity as "Chian earth" (Latin: Chia terra; Greek: πηλομαιοτικο, pēlomaiotiko). Extracted around May each year, it was considered less valuable than the similar medicinal earth produced by Lemnos given that the Limnian earth was considered protective against venoms and poisons but nonetheless reputed to be "the greatest of all cosmetics... giv[ing] a whiteness and smoothness to the skin and prevent[ing] wrinkles beyond any of the other substances that have been celebrated for the same purposes."

== History ==
Pyrgi is possibly a medieval settlement, built before 10th century. It gathered population from different villages, whose residents settled in Pyrgi to avoid the pirates' raids. It is mentioned in documents of the 11th, 14th and 15th centuries. The village didn't suffer damage from the earthquake of 1881 and so it keeps the medieval style. Pyrgi became the seat of the Mastic community and nowadays it is the seat of the Mastichochoria municipal unit.

=== Historical population ===
Census	Settlement	Community
1991	1,164	
2001	1,044	1,314
2011	755	832
2021	969	1,063

== Gallery ==
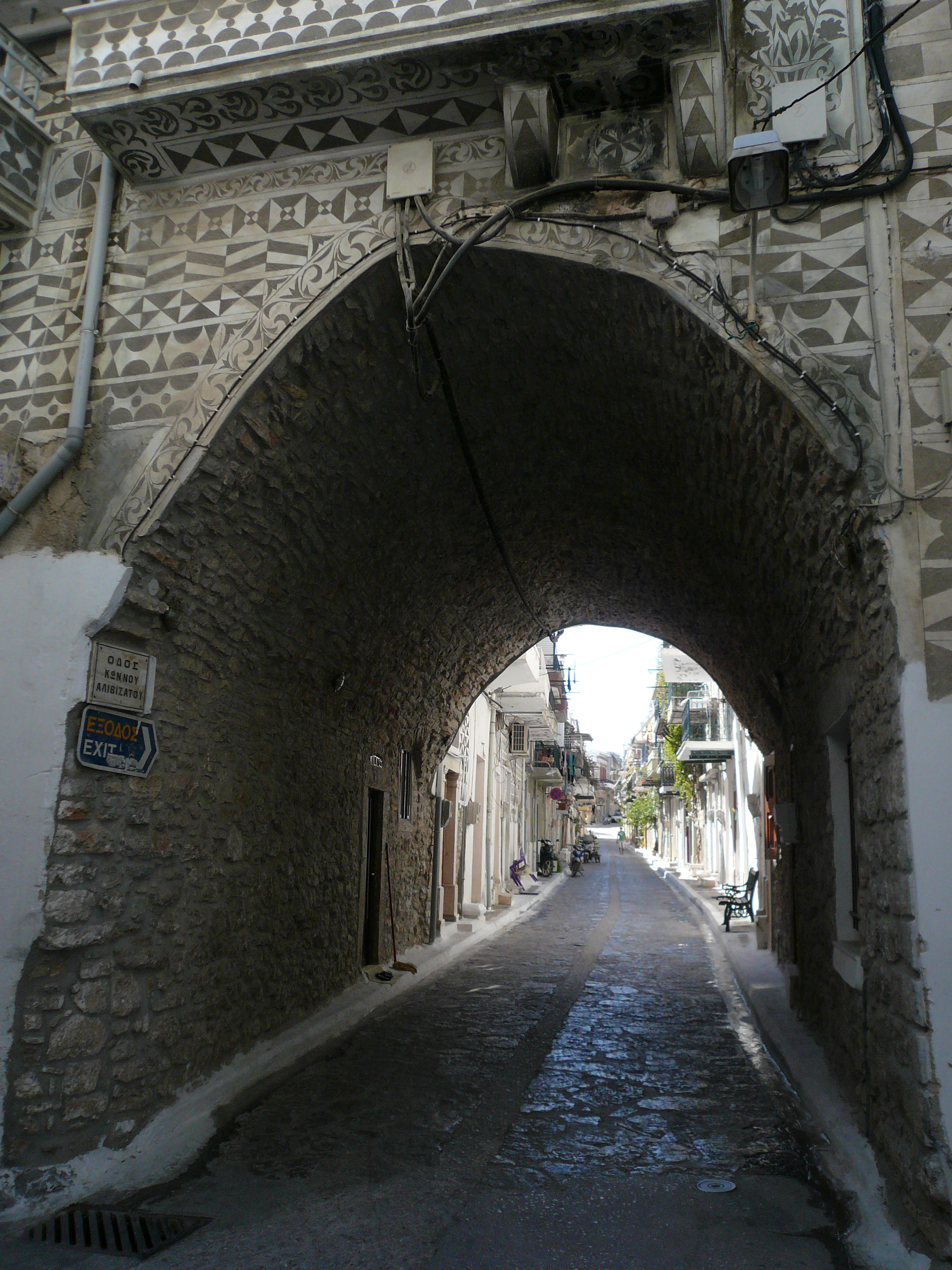
Street of the village

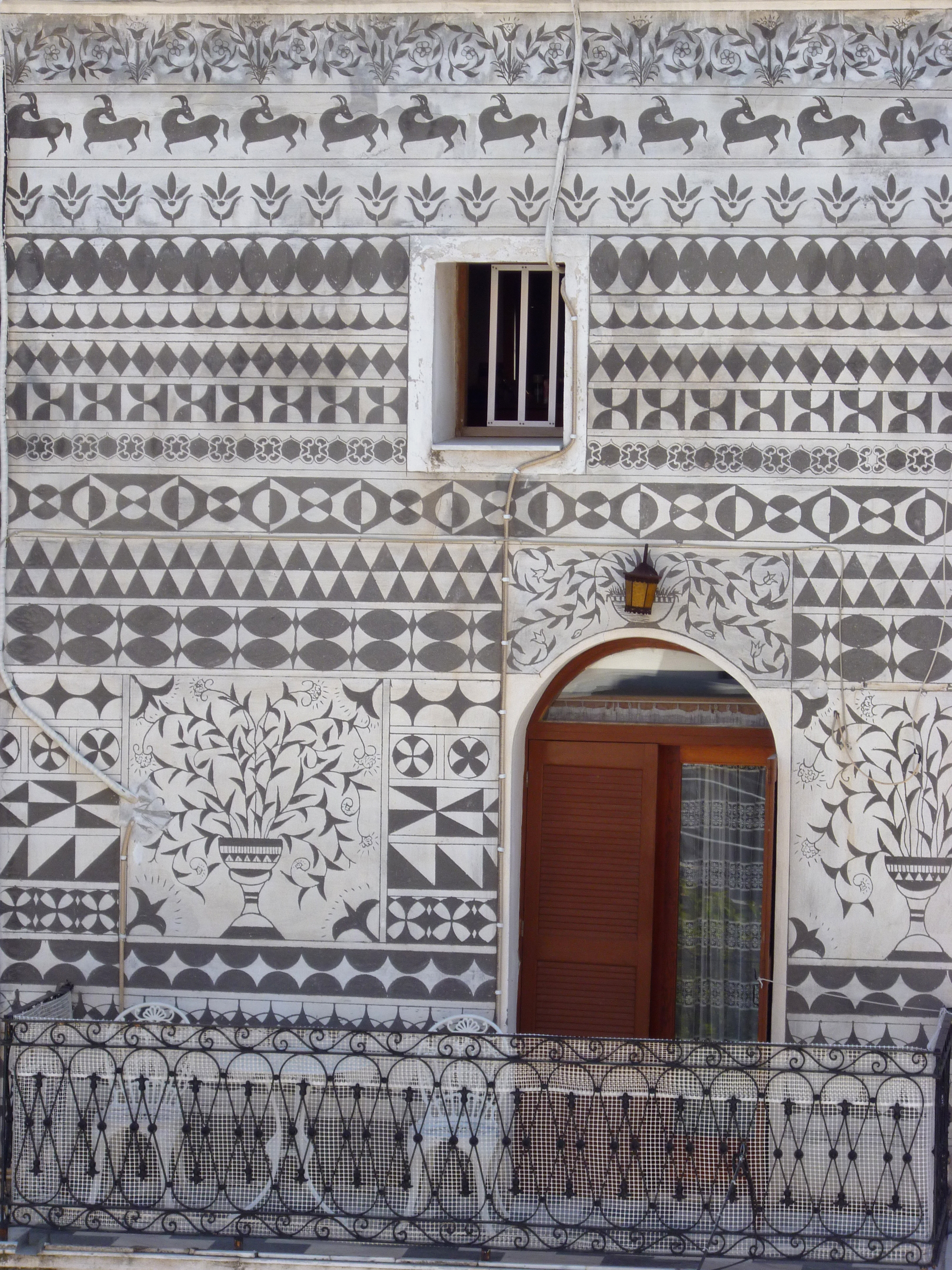
House covered in sgraffito (local name:Xistà)

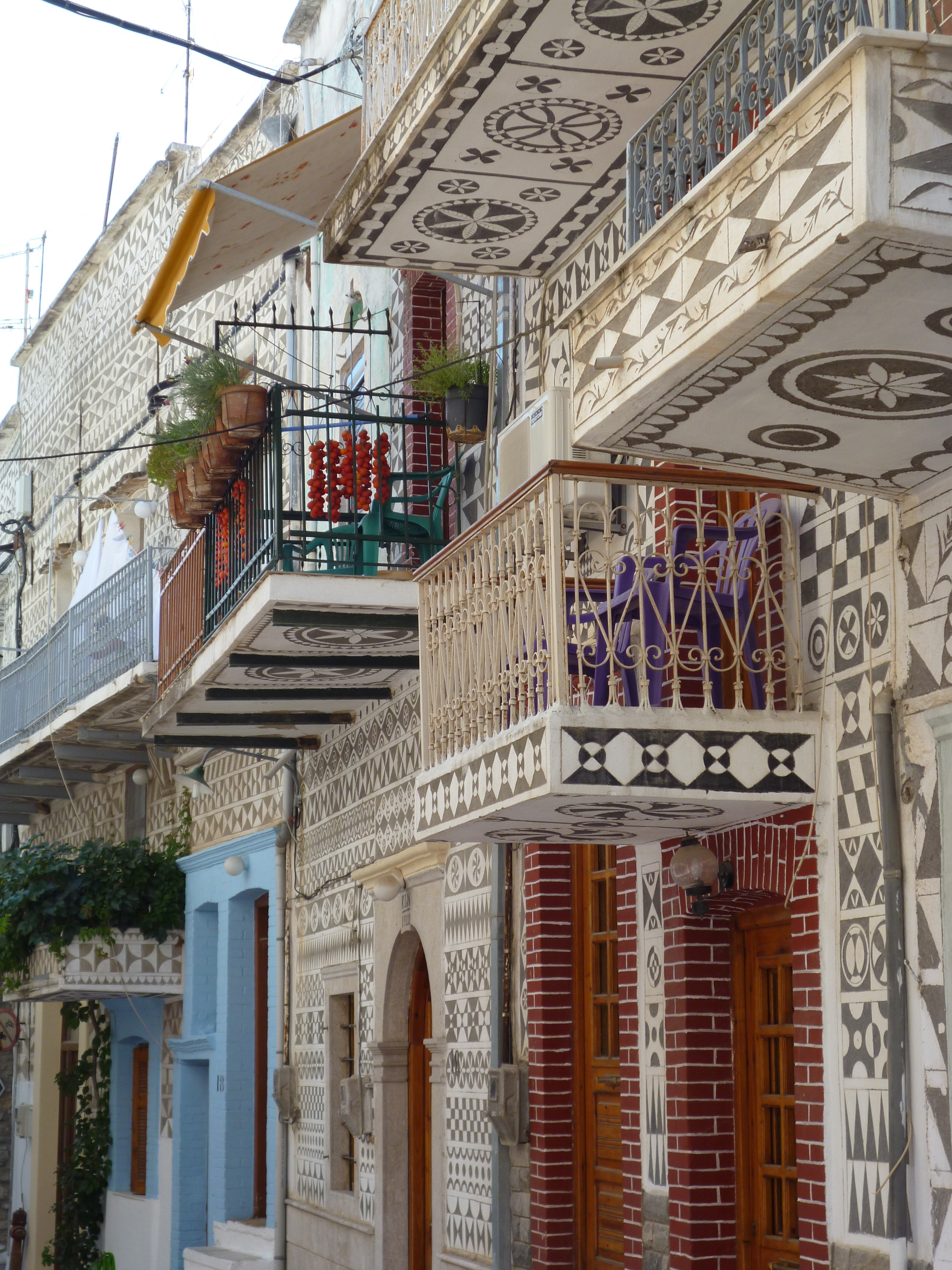
Other buildings

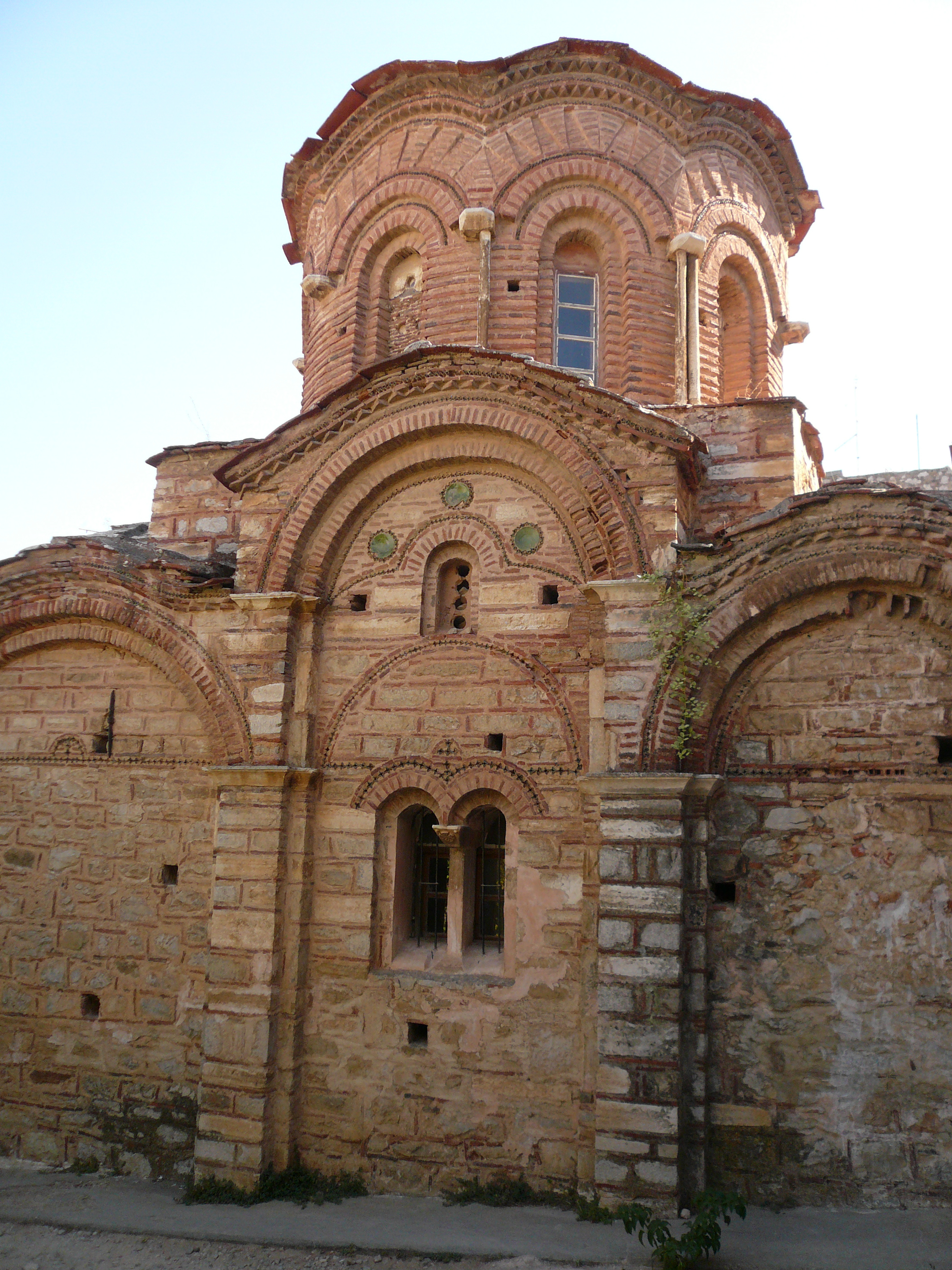
Holy Apostles church

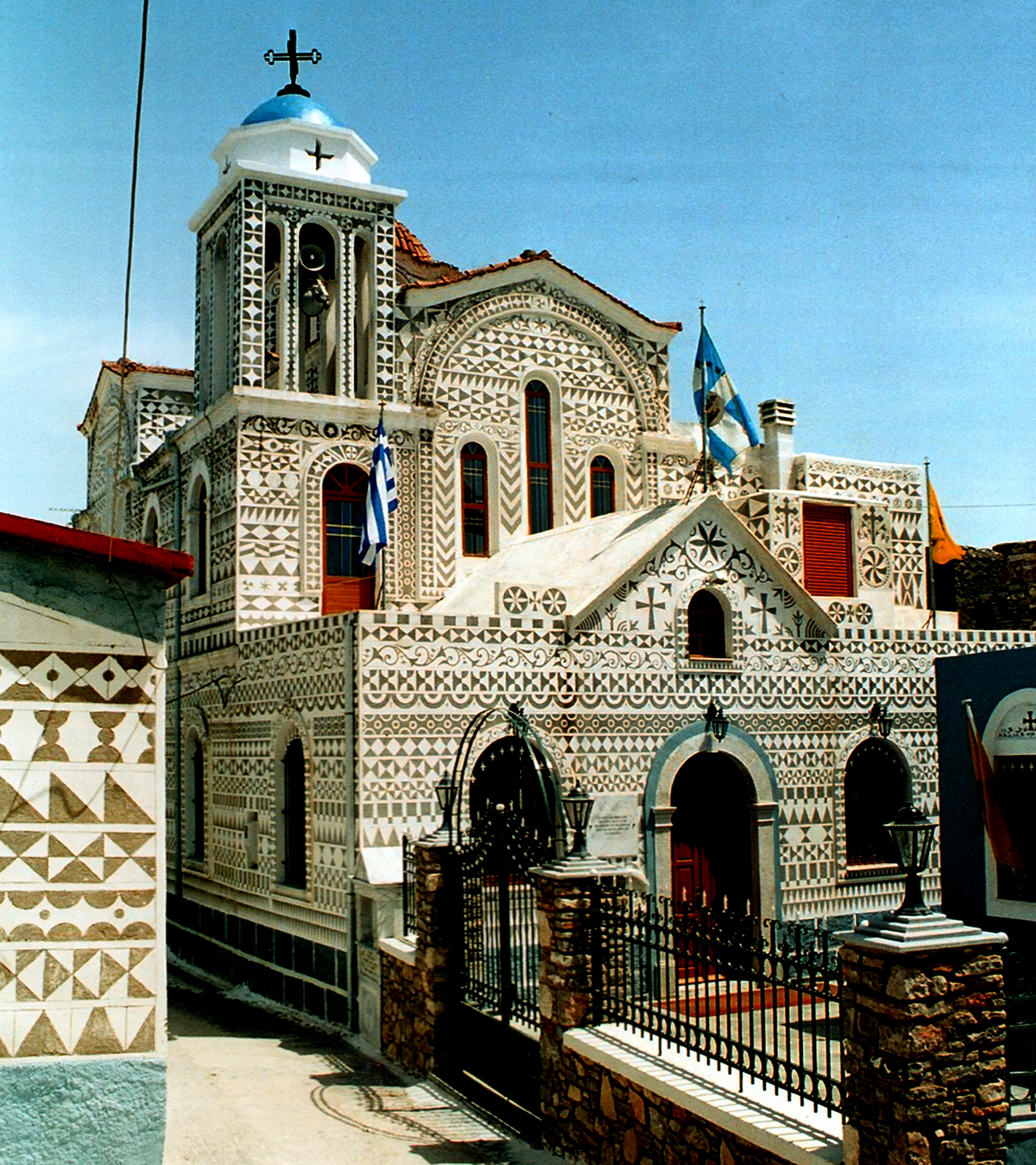
Theotokos church

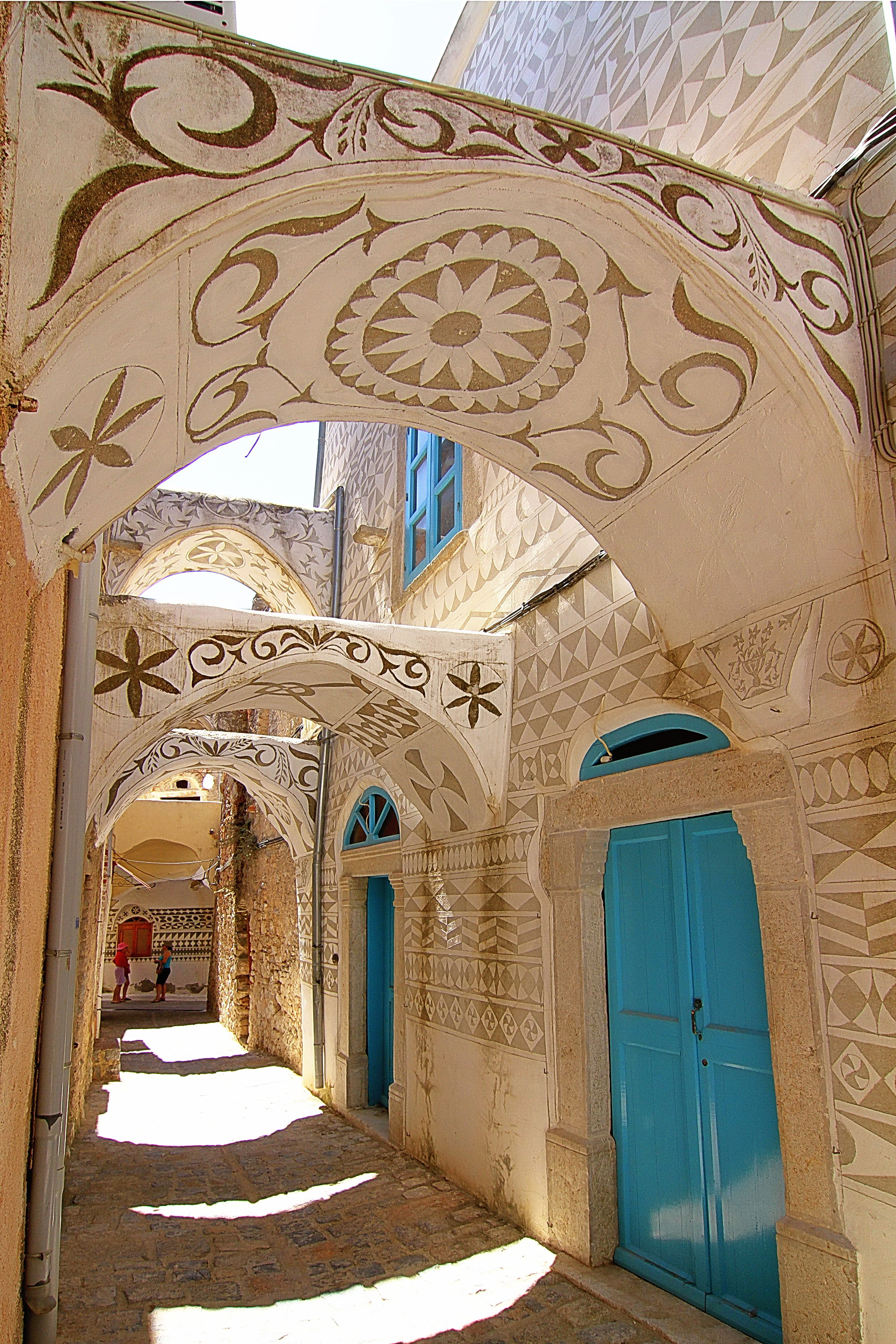
Street of Pyrgi
