= Church of St. Nicholas of the Roof =

11th-century Byzantine monastery in Cyprus

Coordinates: 34°58′38″N 32°53′22″E

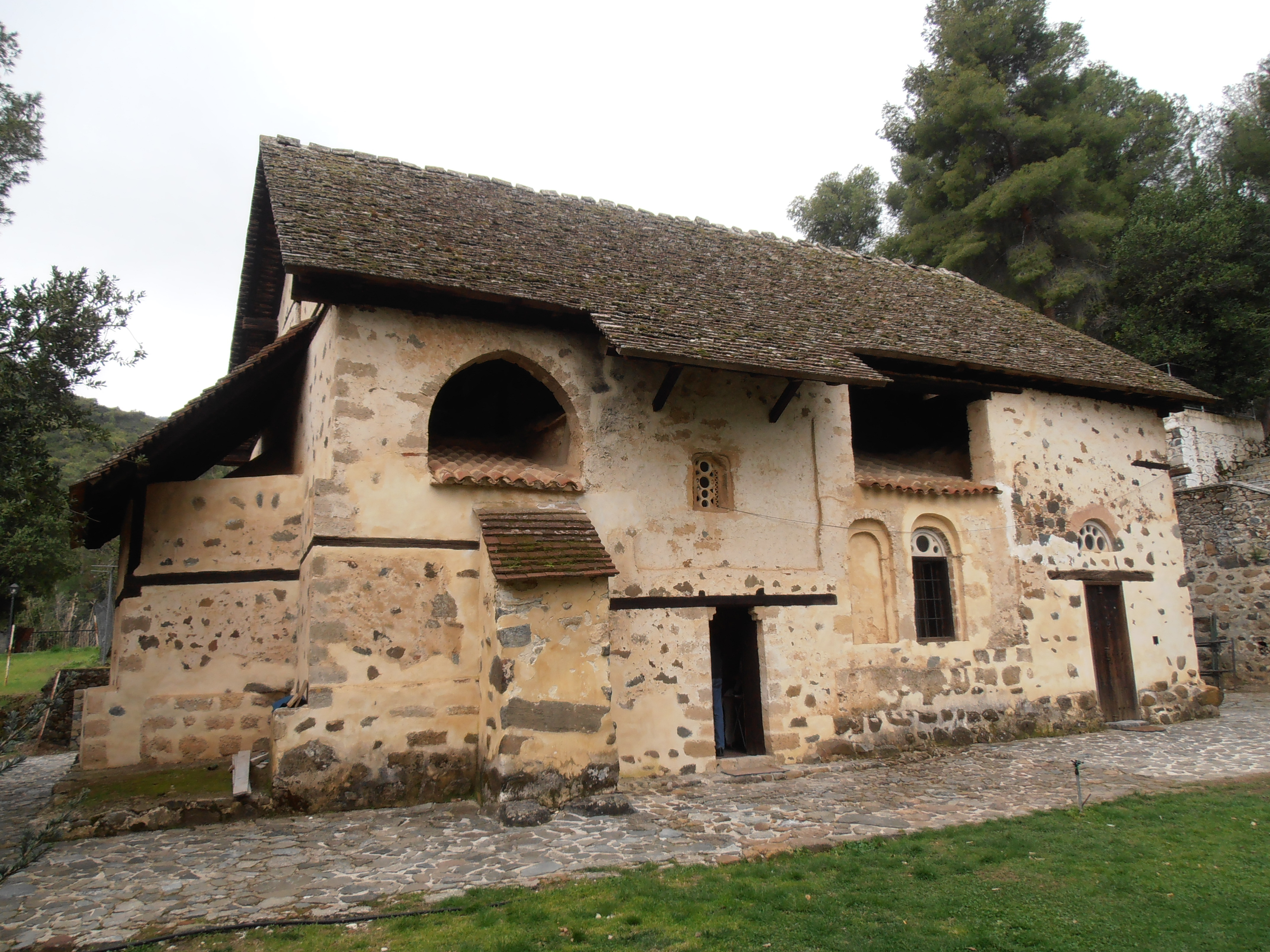
Agios Nikolaos tis Stegis

The Church of St. Nicholas of the Roof (Greek: Άγιος Νικόλαος της Στέγης, Agios Nikolaos Tis Stegis) is an 11th-century Byzantine monastery that flourished in Kakopetria, Cyprus. The church is the only surviving Middle Byzantine katholikon (monastery church) in Cyprus during the 11th century and is not mentioned until the 13th century in surviving texts. St. Nicholas of the Roof prospered from the Middle Byzantine era until the beginning of Frankish rule, around the 12th century. Since Frankish rule the church remained open, but served as a small village church and a pilgrimage site. The church is one of the ten Painted Churches in the Troödos Region, which were inscribed as a UNESCO World Heritage Site in 1985 because of their outstanding frescoes and testimony to the history of Byzantine rule in Cyprus.

== Architectural Context of Cyprus ==
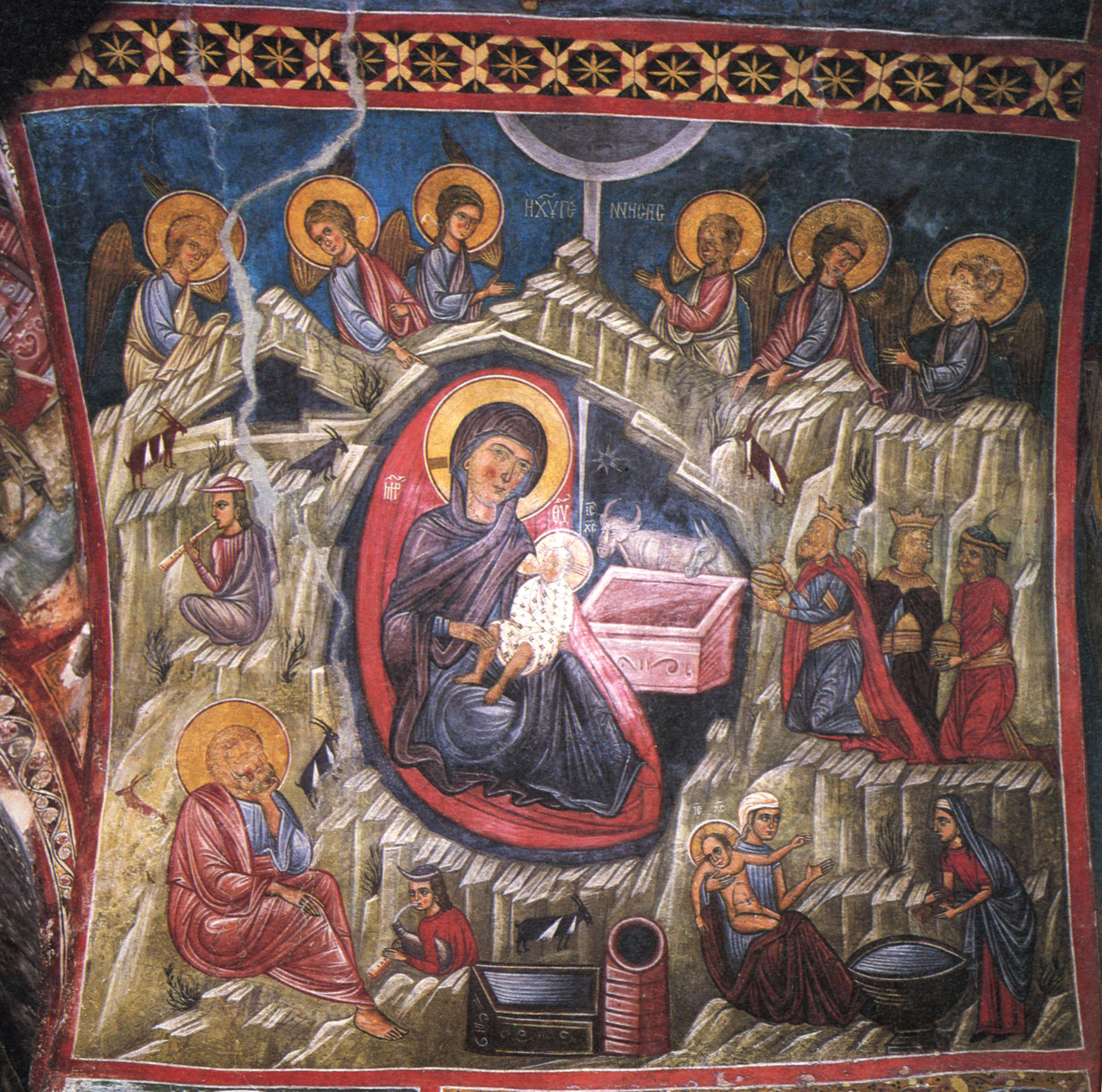
Birth of Christ

Architectural Scholar, Charles Anthony Stewart describes early- Christian churches in his article, The First Vaulted Churches in Cyprus: "All sixty-five known Early Christian churches, dating from the late fourth to mid-seventh century, display the same traits: they have at least three aisles divided by colonnades supporting wood roofs. In this period there are no centrally planned, domed, or vaulted buildings. The conservative nature of Cypriot church building can be explained by the insular character of the Church...The Cypriot Church could maintain its own internal appointments and customs. Because of its independent and powerful hierarchical system, heresies such as Arianism and Monophysitism did not affect Cyprus as they did other Byzantine provinces" (Stewart 162-163). Author Annemarie Weyl Carr continues to depict early Cyprus churches in her journal, Byzantines and Italians on Cyprus: Images from Art: "The Western presence in medieval Cyprus presents itself today and has been studied largely in terms of the island's opulent Gothic architecture, rising amid minarets and palm trees in the Mediterranean sun. Astonishingly romantic, these building invoke an image of French courtly culture transposed to the Middle East" (Weyl 340).

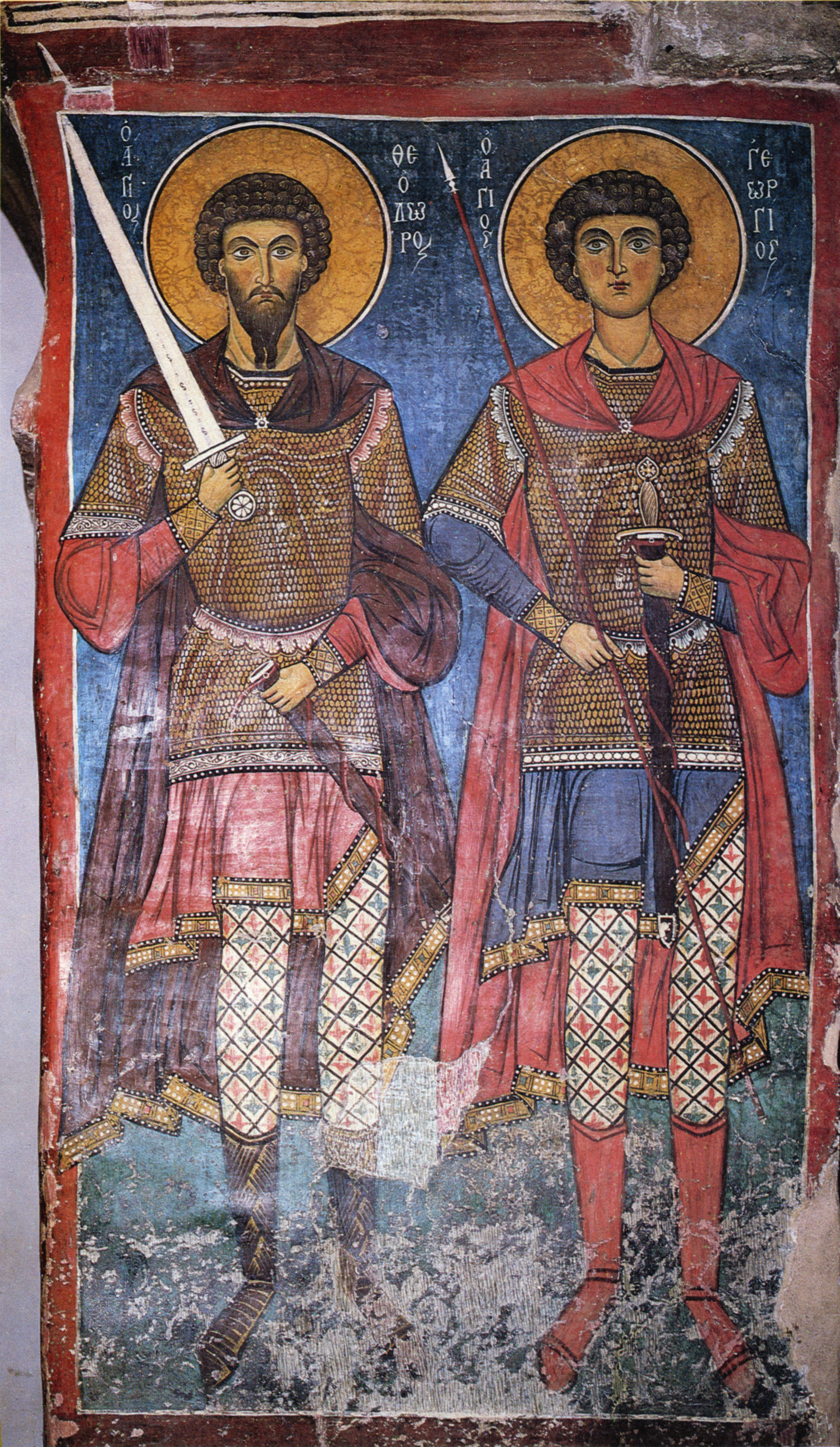
George and Theodor

The architecture of The Church of St. Nicholas of the Roof is a domed cross-in square plan and gets its name from the second timber roof with flat tiles. Originally, there was no narthex or timber roof, which covers both the nave and the narthex. At the beginning of the 12th century the narthex covered by a calotte and two traverse arches was added. This addition of a steep-pitched roof gave Agios Nikolaos the nickname 'of the Roof' ('tis Stegis'). Author A. H. S. Megaw comments on the addition of the later roof, "This later roof conceals a perfectly normal church of the Byzantine inscribed-cross type, complete with a dome...These step-pitched roofs would then represent the indigenous "provincial", architecture of this area of Cyprus, which was temporarily supplanted by alien Byzantine domes" (Megaw 81 & 88). At a later stage the church's original appearance was altered resulting in the destruction of some interior paintings.

== Interior Decoration ==
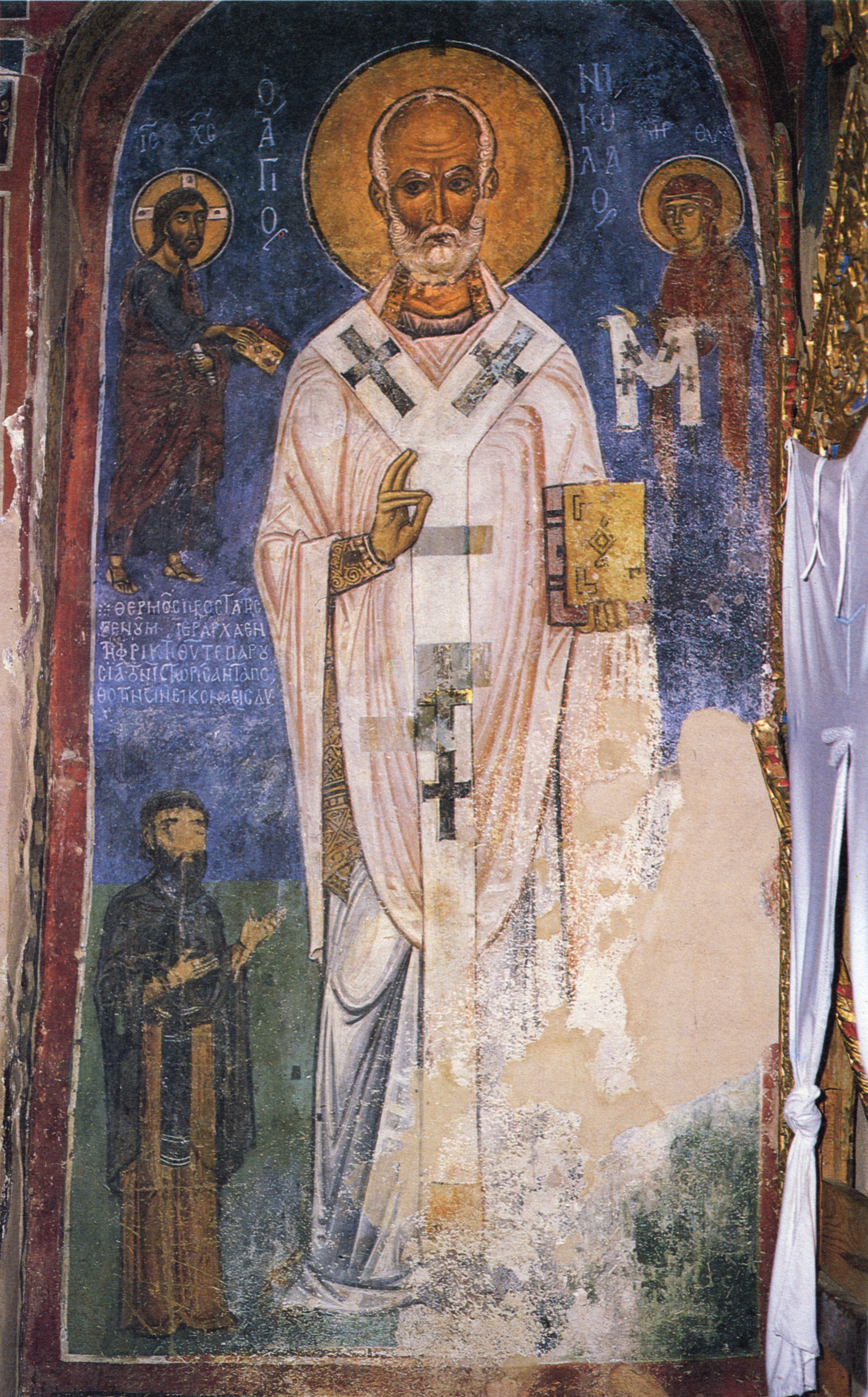
Nikolaus

The interior walls of the church are adorned with a series of frescoes ranging over 600 years. The first phase of decoration began in the 11th century and survived the later raids and general deterioration due to time. Again, author A. H. S. Megaw comments on the decoration of the church, "what remains of its initial fresco decoration is not of the first class, it is still a reflection, if a somewhat remote one, of the central tradition of Constantinople. In heads such as those of the apostles in scenes and that of the Gabriel lately uncovered in the apse we see the deep-set staring eyes of the expressionist style which fresco painters of the time inherited from Byzantine miniaturists of the Macedonian Renaissance" (Megaw 82). The murals depict scenes from the life of Jesus, the Raising of Lazarus, the Dormition of the Virgin Mary, and some isolated figures.

The second phase of decoration has been dated back to the 12th century and includes wall-paintings from the southwest part of the church and the narthex. Author, Megaw explains, "Much of St. Nicholas of the Roof was redecorated in the 12th century with more sophisticated paintings, among them the usual series of Church Fathers on the apse wall which in this case includes a characteristic representation of St. Epiphanius. Naturally he figures frequently among the Fathers in Cypriot apses. We will see more of this Comneniam style which in Cyprus is explicable only in the injection of new talent in the shape of masters who had been trained outside the Island, some of them perhaps in Constantinople itself" (Megaw 82). Although some wall paintings from the 11th and 12th century survive, most of the mural decoration of the church is dated to the 14th century. The murals of The Crucifixion and the Resurrection were painted in the late 13th century to the beginning of the 14th century. The image of Christ Pantocrator adorns the dome along with prophets on the drum of the dome and the evangelists on the four pendentives. These three works are dated to the mid 14th century. In the nave and the narthex there is a group of life size saints dated to the same period. On the northwest pier, there are two massive images of St. Theodore and St. George.

== See also ==
Explore the Church of Agios Nikolaos tis Stegis in 3D. The IHAT Platform
