= Mastichochoria =

Mastichochoria Μαστιχοχώρια
- Municipal unit
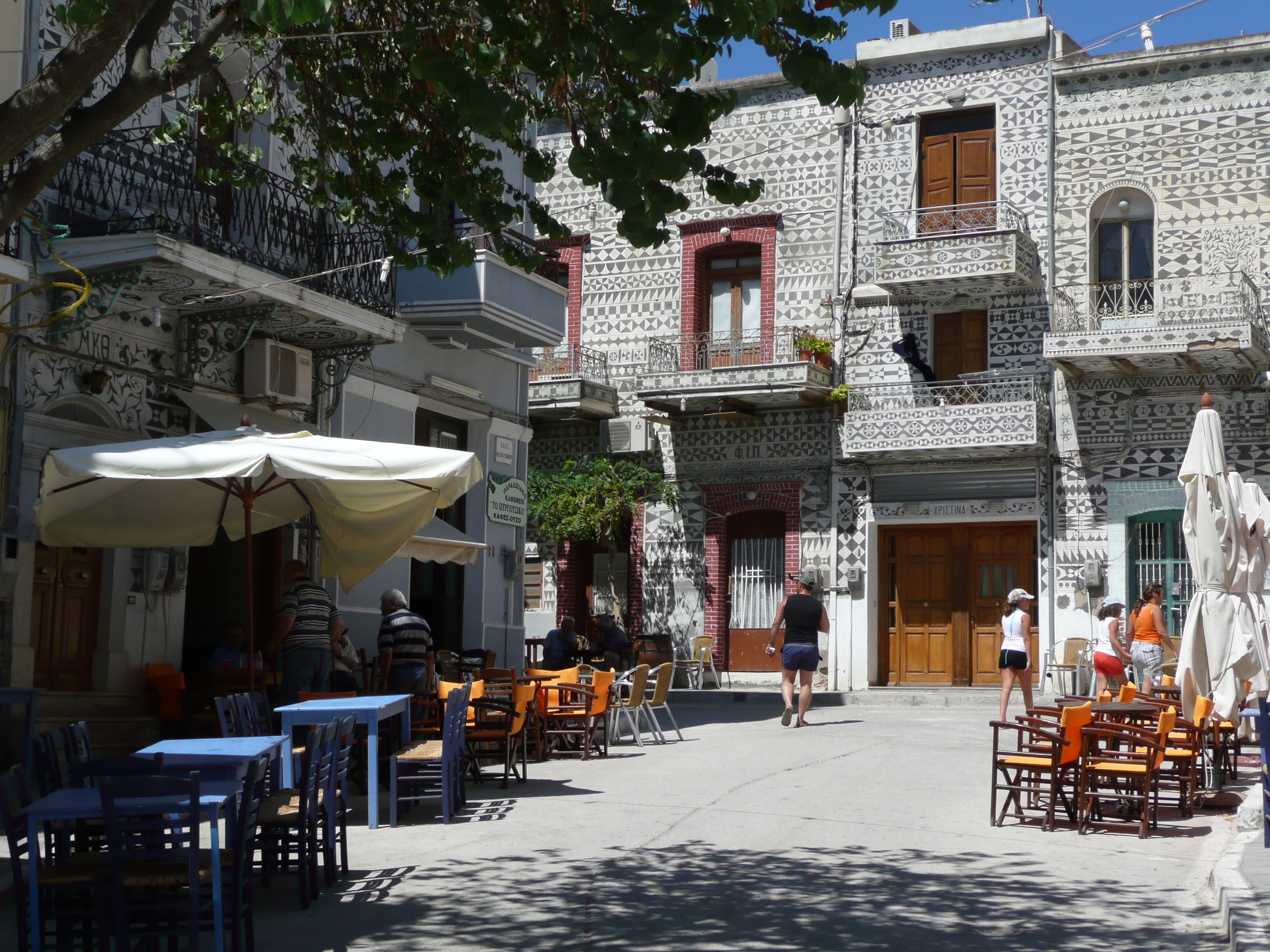
- Central square of Pyrgi

- Location within the regional unit

- Location within Greece
- Coordinates: 38°15′N 25°59′E
- Country: Greece
- Administrative region: North Aegean
- Regional unit: Chios
- Municipality: Chios

Area
  - Municipal unit: 211.7 km^{2} (81.7 sq mi)

Population (2021)
  - Municipal unit: 3,384
  - Municipal unit density: 15.98/km^{2} (41.40/sq mi)
- Time zone: UTC+2 (EET)
  - Summer (DST): UTC+3 (EEST)
- Vehicle registration: ΧΙ

Mastichochoria (Greek: Μαστιχοχώρια, Greek pronunciation: [mastixoˈxorʝʲa], lit. "the mastic villages" in English) is a former municipality on the island of Chios (Χίος), North Aegean, Greece. Since the 2011 local government reform it is part of the municipality Chios, of which it is a municipal unit. It is located in the southwestern and extreme southern part of the island. It is the largest municipal unit in land area on Chios at 211.687 km^{2}. Its population was 3,384 at the 2021 census. The seat of the municipality was Pyrgi (Πυργί). The next largest villages are Kalamotí (Καλαμωτń), Armólia (Αρμόλια), Mestá (Μεστά), and Lithí (Λιθί). The small coastal village of Emporeios (Εμπορειός) boasts an archaeological site.

This area is well known for the production of mastic, from which it derives its name. Mastic is the hardened resin of the mastic tree and is only harvested on Chios, being a major part of the local economy. In the village of Pyrgi, there is even a small Museum of Mastic.

Within the European Union, Chios mastika, a mastic-flavoured liqueur has a protected designation of origin. The island's mastic production is controlled by a co-operative of medieval villages. The local producers are united under the Chios Gum Mastic Growers Association.

== Chios Gum Mastic Growers Association ==
Founded in 1938, the Chios Gum Mastic Growers Association (Greek: Ένωση Μαστιχοπαραγωγών Χίου), abbreviated CGMGA, is a cooperative organisation and acts as the collective representative organ of twenty primary cooperatives totalling nearly 5000 members in the twenty-four villages of southern Chios. It has the exclusive management of Chios mastika in Greece and abroad. Its international equivalent in French is the Union des Producteurs de Gomme Mastic de Chios.

The organisation is mainly involved with the management of the agricultural production, supporting local growers, stimulating research, and providing legal assistance.

The CGMGA has a Board of Directors consists of nine members. Three members are permanent: these are the Director of the Agricultural Service, the technical supervisor of the ATE bank and the Commissioner of NCGAC. The other six board positions are elected.

=== List of mastic villages ===
- Mesta
- Olimpi
- Pyrgi
- Armolia
- Kalamoti
- Patrika
- Kini
- Vouno
- Nenita
- Katarraktis
- Kallimassia
- Messa Didima
- Ekso Didima
- Mirmigi
- Tholopotami
- Agios Georgios
- Vessa
- Elata
- Lithi
- Neochorio

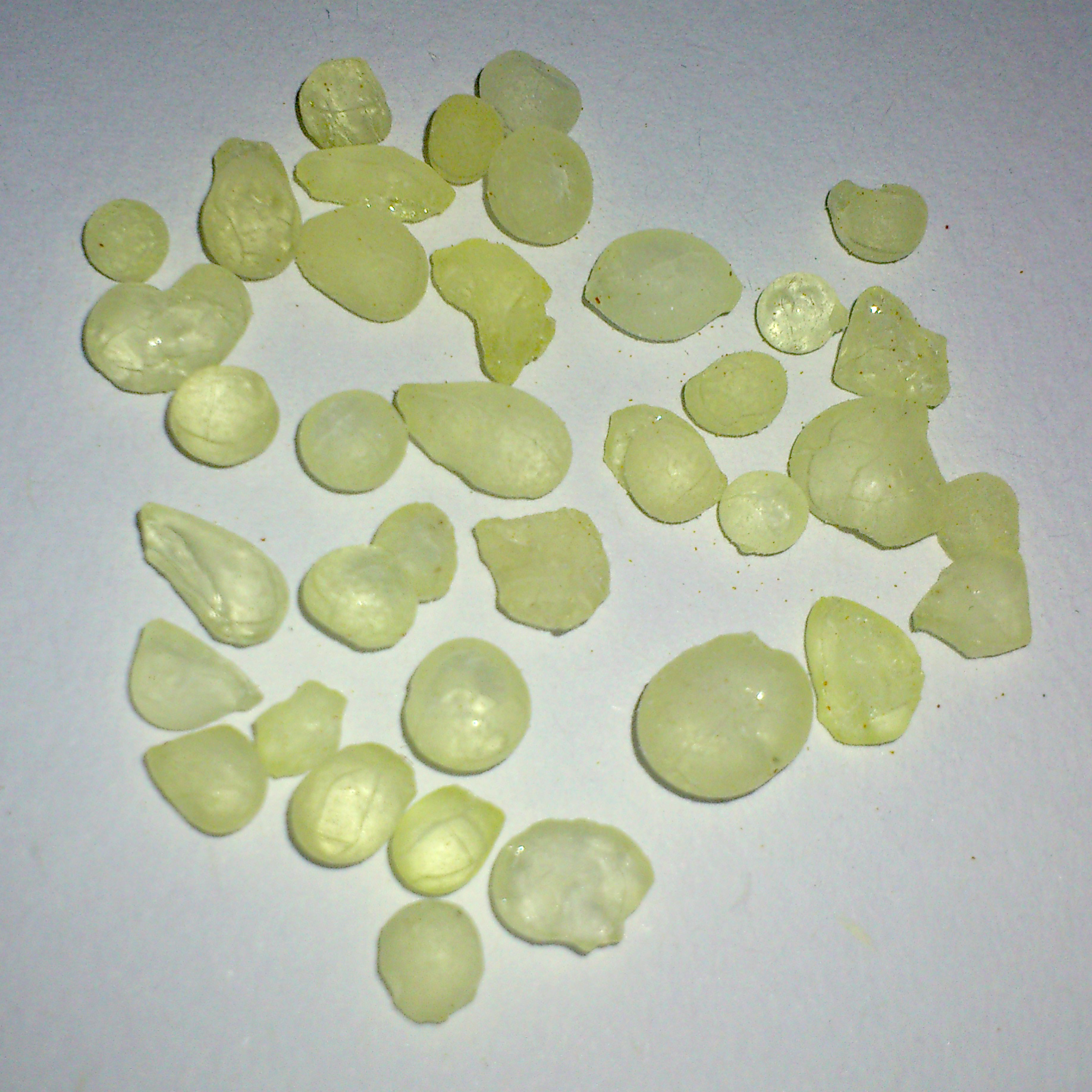
Mastic (plant resin)

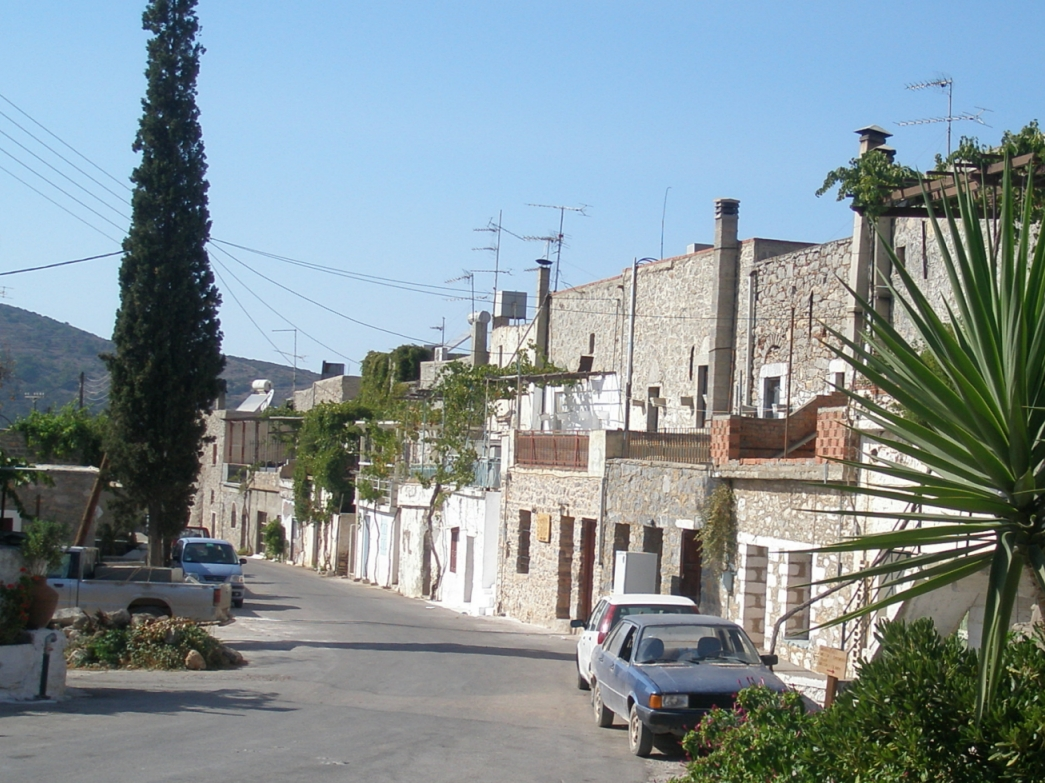
Mesta

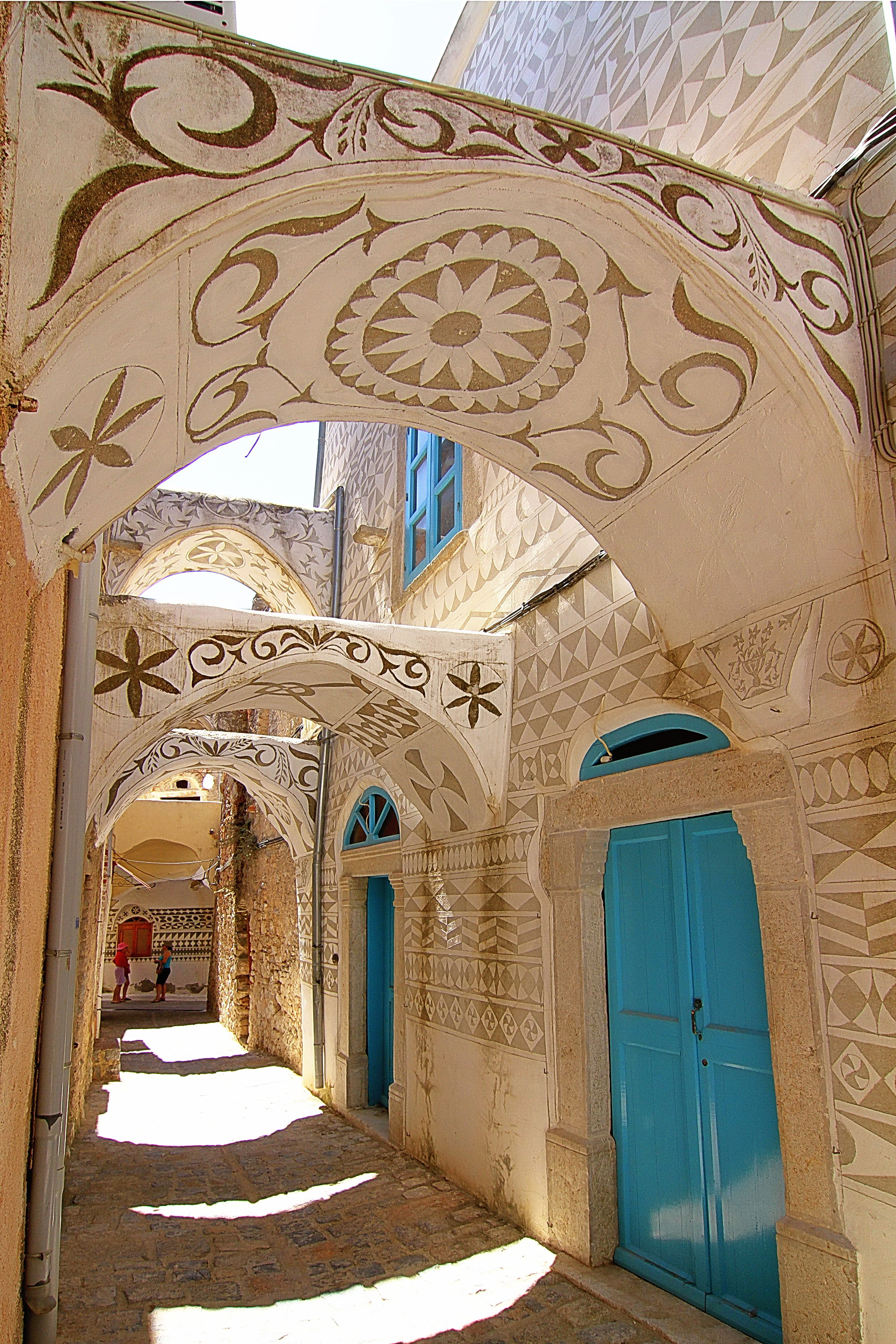
Street of Pyrgi covered with sgraffito

== Museum of Mastic ==
On 11 June 2016, the Chios Mastic Museum opened its doors in Rachi, on the southern part of Chios in the region of the Mastichochoria. It offers a permanent exhibition about mastiha production on the island, explaining its history and cultivation techniques as well as demonstrating its different uses today.

== Historical events ==
In the Chios Massacre of 1822, during the Ottoman rule of Chios, the people of Mastichochoria were spared as their survival was the foundation of the island's continued prosperity (and the tax proceeds it remitted to Constantinople). .

In 2012 the Mastichochoria and its trees were threatened by a wildfire that broke out in the southern part of the island.
