= Church of Saint George Diasoritis =

Church on the island of Naxos, Greece

Coordinates: 37°3′57.8″N 25°28′50.6″E

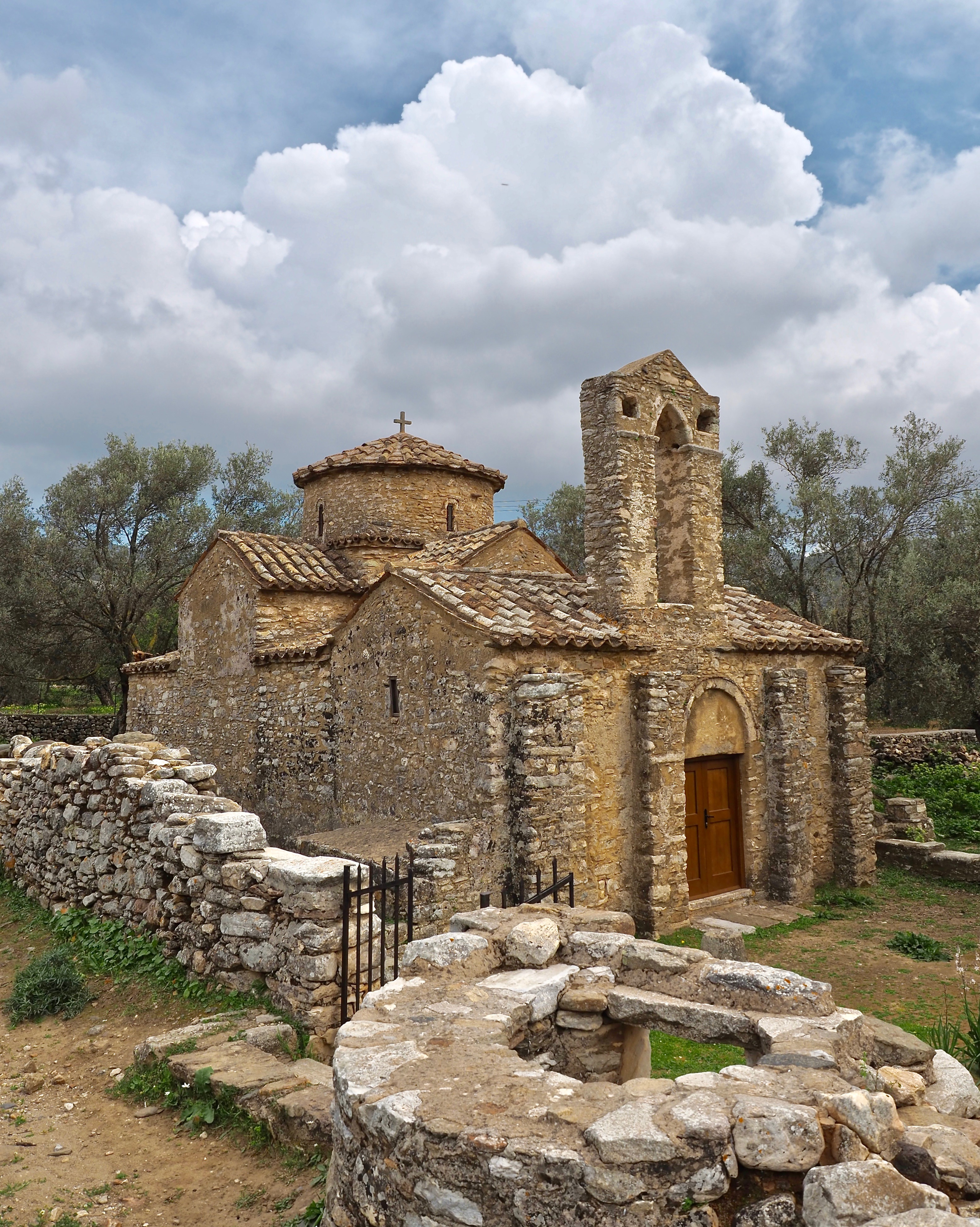
Diasoritis church

The church of Saint George Diasoritis (Greek: Άγιος Γεώργιος ο Διασορίτης) is a Byzantine church about 600 metres (10 minutes on foot) from Halki village (also known as Tragaia) in the centre of Naxos island.

== History ==
It was built and decorated in the 11th century. It must have been one of the most important churches in the region, attested by the architecture, the wall paintings, the sculptures, the two arcosolia with graves in the narthex and the inscription.

The church is of the cross-in-square type, with a dome resting upon four built piers and a lower narthex on the west side. This type is rare in Naxos. The cross arms are barrel-vaulted and the narthex has a vaulted ceiling and is divided into three bays. Two arcosolia, with now empty tombs, were built into the thickness of the north and south walls, opposite each other.

== The frescoes ==
Decorative stone mouldings run along the walls, articulating the surfaces and defining the three registers of the iconographic programme. In the dome, Christ Pantocrator is surrounded by full-length figures in the drum. In the apse are depicted the Virgin and Child, frontal standing figures of hierarchs and, in the lower register, Saint George painted within a frame, like that of an icon, with his parents in roundels on either side. The cross arms are decorated with representations from the cycle of the Twelve Great Feasts (Nativity, Presentation of the Christ in the Temple, Baptism, Entry into Jerusalem, Ascension, Pentecost, Annunciation) and the walls are painted with portraits of soldier-saints and martyrs. Saint George, Archangel Michael and Saint John the Baptist are given a special place in the iconographic programme. Another three representations are dedicated to Saint George: in the Deesis, where he takes the place of Saint John the Baptist, on the vault of the northwest corner bay and on the south wall of the southwest corner bay.

The wall-paintings are covered in places by a second painting layer of the 13th century, restricted to the half dome of the apse and the lower registers of the walls. Two or three layers of wall-paintings are also found in the narthex, which is of funerary character. The main iconographic theme is the Second Coming.

In the southeast corner of the narthex there is an interesting dedicatory inscription of John the Protospatharios. The inscription of a high-ranking Byzantine official is of wider importance, not only for the church, but also for the role of the region as an important administrative centre controlling the island's hinterland.

== See also ==
- List of churches under the patronage of Saint George
