= Kakopetria =

Kakopetria: Κακοπετριά (Greek); Kakopetriya (Turkish)
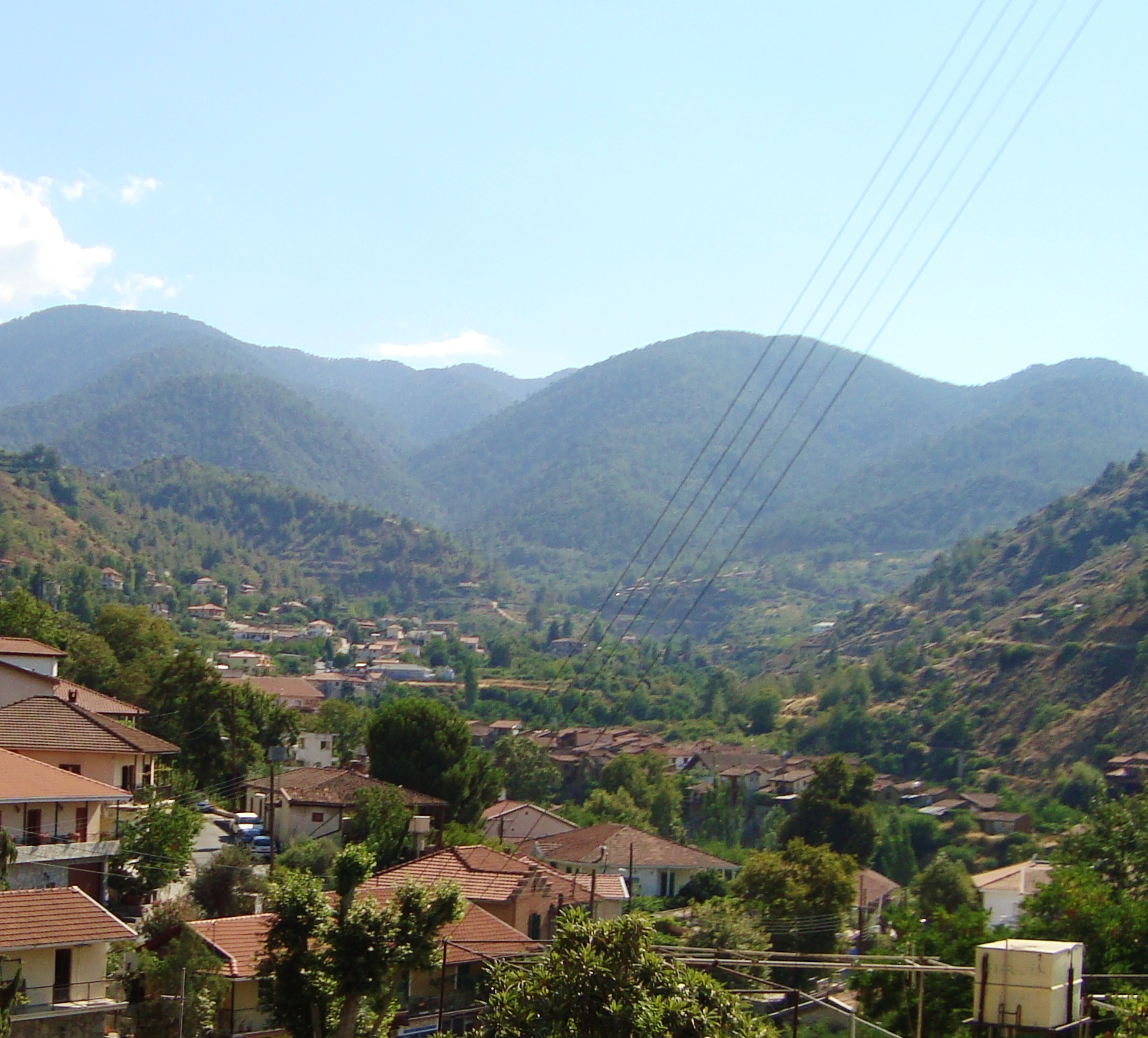

- Location in Cyprus
- Coordinates: 34°59′0″N 32°54′0″E
- Country: Cyprus
- District: Nicosia District

Population (2001)
  - Total: 1,198
- Time zone: UTC+2 (EET)
  - Summer (DST): UTC+3 (EEST)
- Postal code: 2800
- Website: https://www.kakopetria.org.cy/

Kakopetria (Greek: Κακοπετριά; Turkish: Kakopetriya) is a town in Cyprus located 55 kilometres (34 mi) southwest of the capital, Nicosia, on the north-facing foothills of the Troodos Mountains. It stands at an altitude of 667 metres and it is the highest village in the Solea Valley. The community has about 1,200 permanent inhabitants and a couple hundred more who either have a summer house or are originally from Kakopetria but work in Nicosia. Near Kakopetria there is church from 11th century, Agios Nikolaos tis Stegis, UNESCO World Heritage Site.

== Landscape ==
Kakopetria is surrounded by thick forestland and is built on the banks of the Kargotis and Garillis Rivers. The two rivers join within village itself and form the river Klarios, which crosses the Solea Valley and empties into Morphou Bay.

The settlement of Kakopetria is constructed along the valley of the Kargotis and Garillis rivers. The new Kakopetria with its large, modern houses and their tiled roofs, built in the gradient ground and the riverbanks, is located in the eastern part of the valley. The old Kakopetria is built west of the valley and between the two rivers. The roofs of the houses are sloped and tiled and almost all of the houses have an upper floor and a wooden balcony.

== History ==
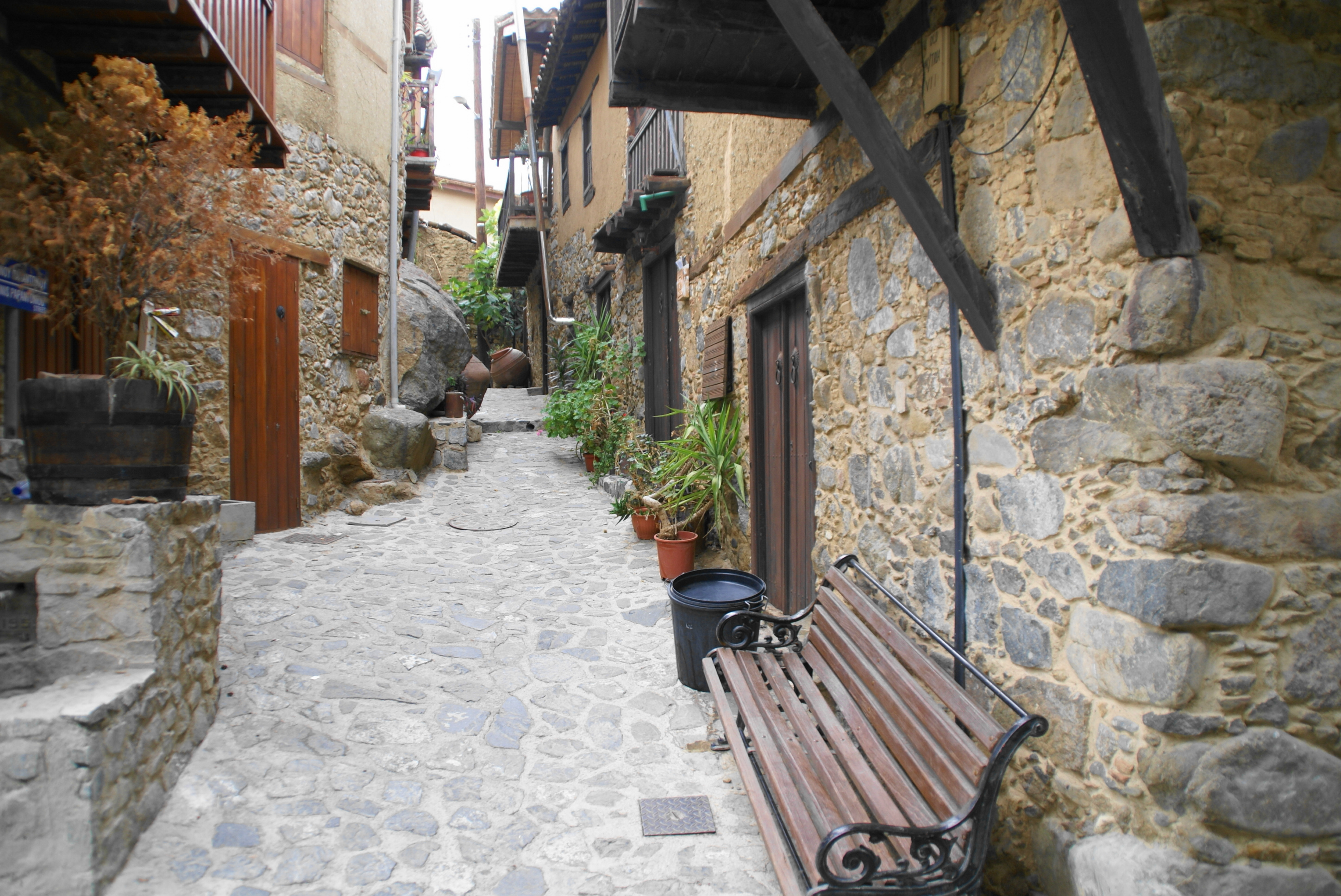
Medieval streets in Kakopetria

The settlement of Kakopetria, although mentioned by the Mediaeval annalists, existed -at least -since the Frank domination era (Lusignan Period 1192–1489). The village's region was inhabited around the 6th-7th centuries and the various excavations that have been conducted in 1938 around the old village of Kakopetria (in the Ailades venue) prove this. During the excavations a dispenser of an ancient shrine, most probably belonging to the goddess Athena came to light. A large number of movable findings were found, mainly terra-cotta, many of which depict the goddess Athena, as well as small, limestone, statues and parts of statues, and bronze and iron shafts from spearheads and arrows. The findings most probably date back to the Archaic and Classic eras of Cyprus. Other statuettes represent Hercules and are an indication that he was also worshiped in the area along with the goddess Athena. These findings are found in the Archaeological Museum of Nicosia.

== Agios Nikolaos tis Stegis ==
Near Kakopetria there is church Agios Nikolaos tis Stegis (greek Αγίος Νικολάος της Στέγης, Saint Nicholas of the Roof) which is a UNESCO World Heritage Site along with nine other Painted Churches in the Troödos Region. Church is built in 11. century. The church is the only surviving Middle Byzantine katholikon (monastery church) in Cyprus during the 11th century. It prospered from the Middle Byzantine era until the beginning of Frankish rule, around the 12th century.

== Village name ==
There are two versions about the origin of the village's name. According to first version Kakopetria name is a compound of greek words "kako" (bad) and "petra" (stone, rock). According to second version the name comes from a legend about a big rock called "Petra tou Androgynou" (Couples' Rock). That rock is now close to the bridge and newly wedded couples would sit on it, until according to legend the rock rolled over one couple and that rock they called bad rock.

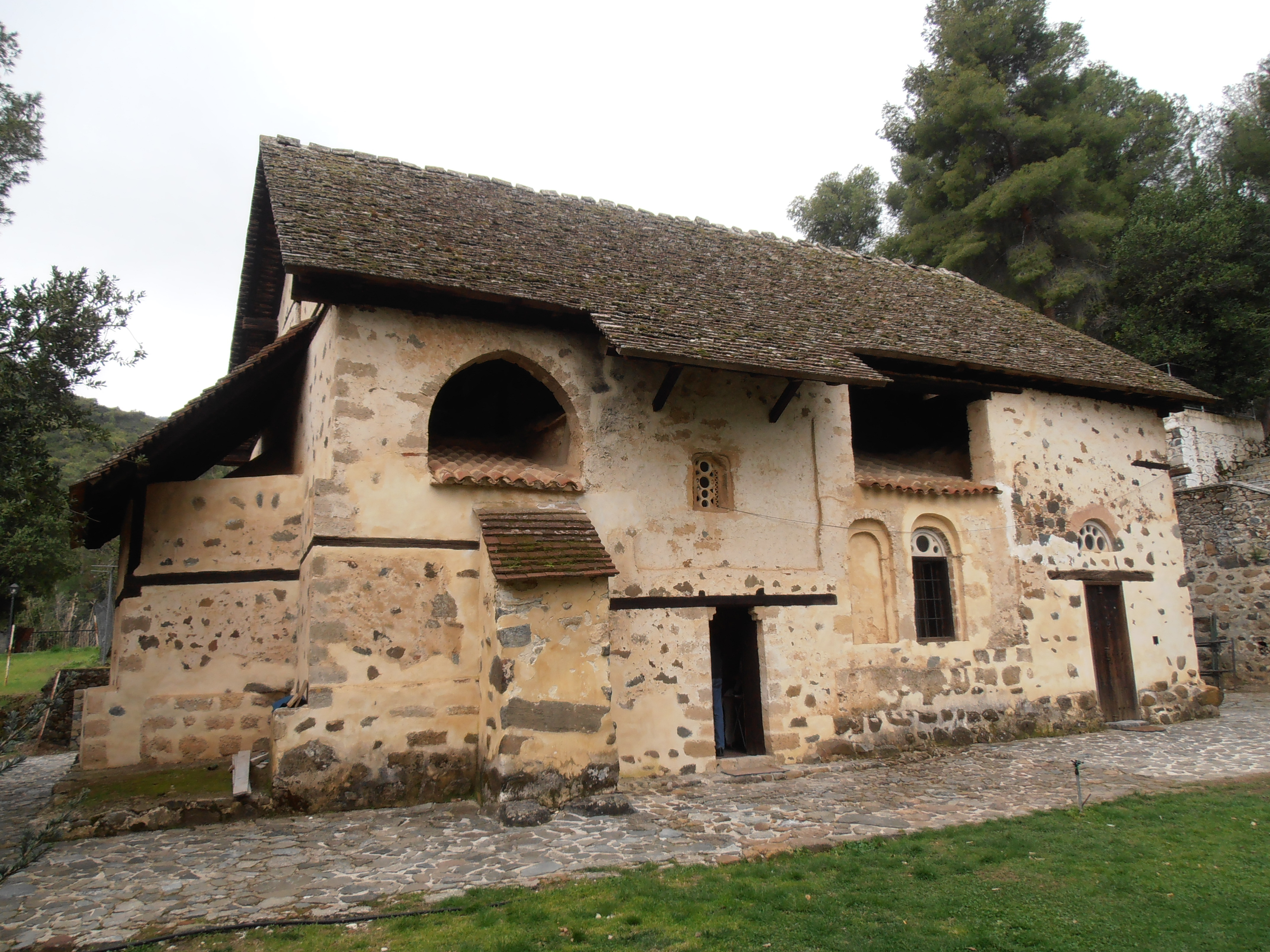
Agios Nikolaos tis Stegis

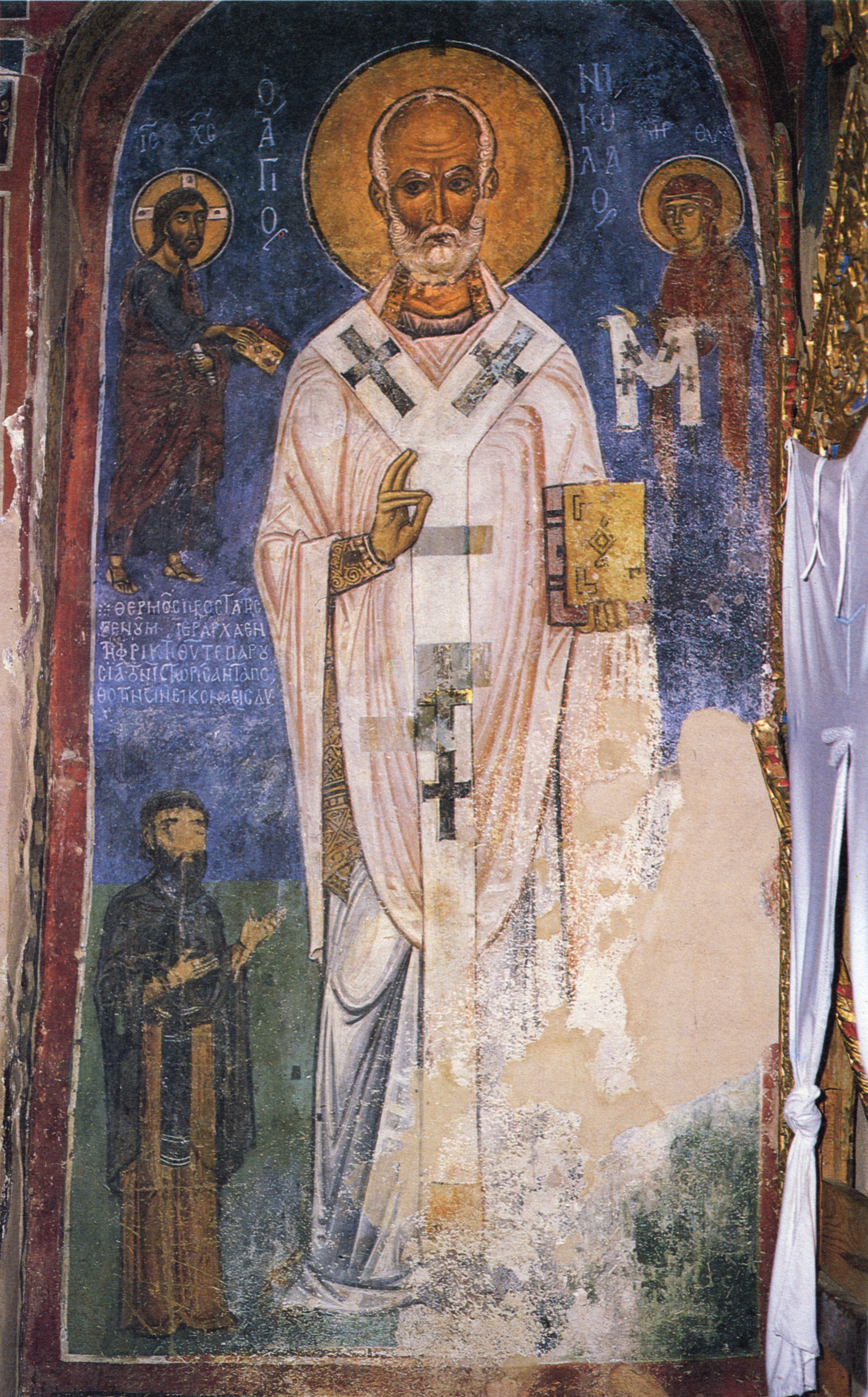
St. Nicholas

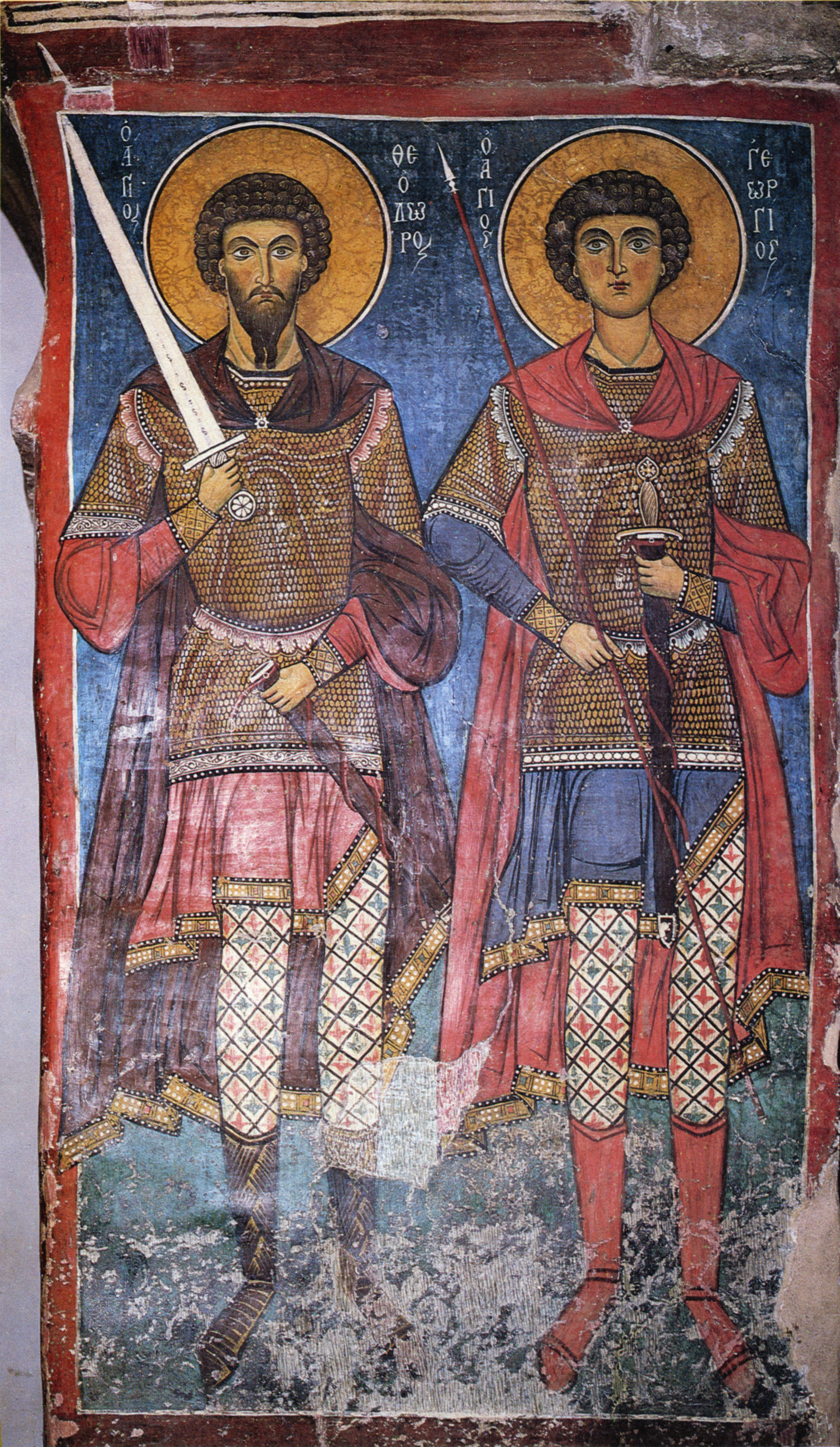
St George and Theodor

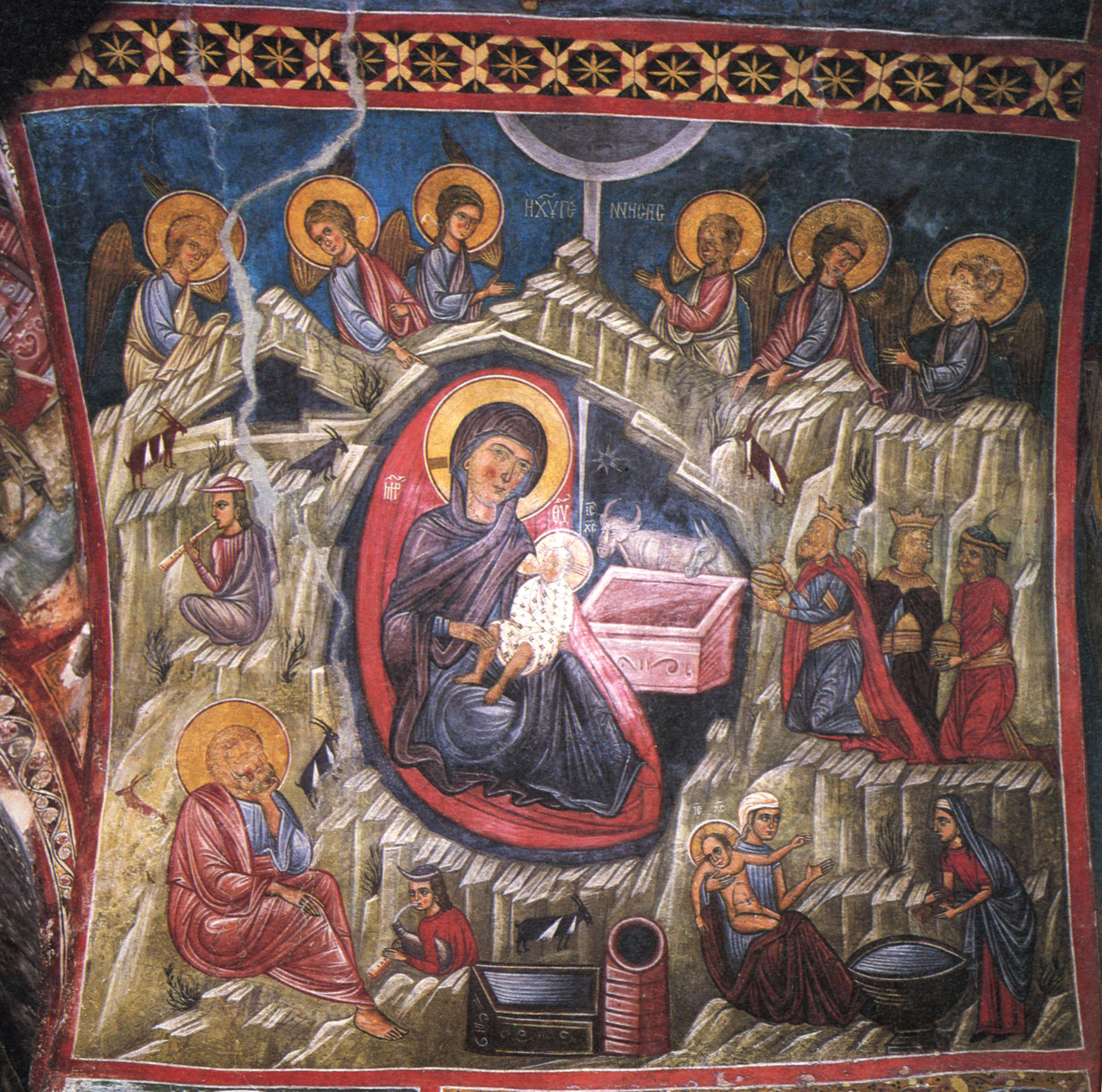
Birth of Christ
