= Ice cream varieties by country =

There are a number of ice cream varieties around the world.

== Argentina ==
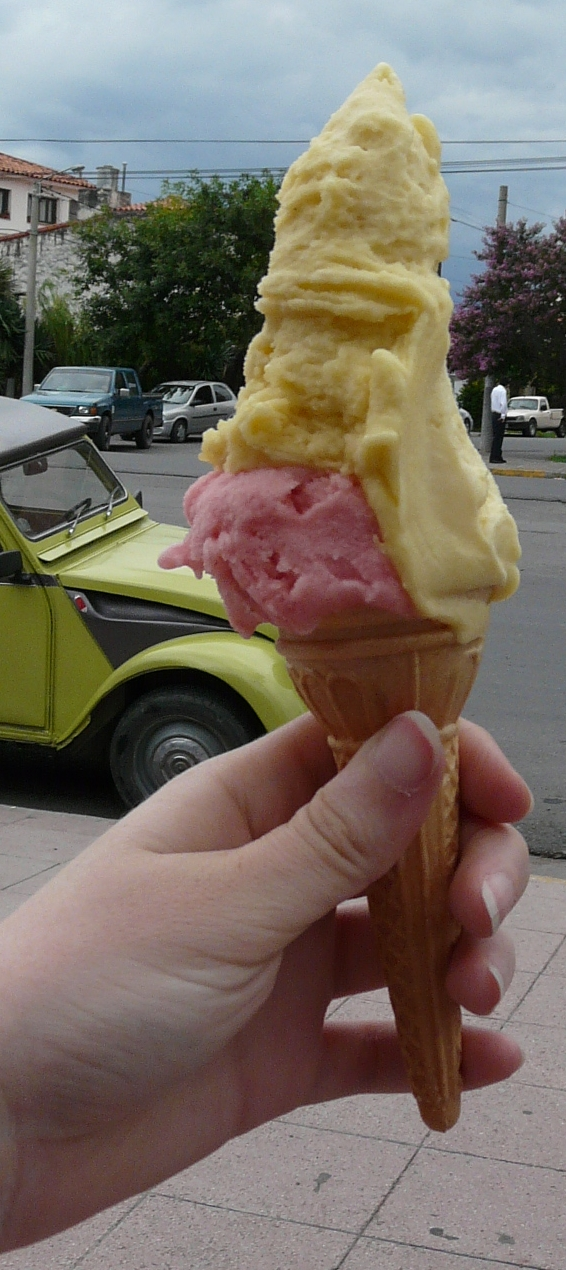
An ice cream cone in Salta, Argentina

While industrial ice cream exists in Argentina and can be found in supermarkets, restaurants or kiosks, and ice cream pops are sold on some streets and at the beaches, the most traditional Argentine helado (ice cream) is similar to Italian gelato, rather than US-style ice cream, and it has become one of the most popular desserts in the country. Among the most famous manufacturers are "Freddo", "Persicco", "Chungo", "Cremolatti" and "Munchi's", all of them located in Buenos Aires. Each city has its own heladerías (ice cream parlors) which offer different varieties of creamy and water-based ice creams, including both standard and regional flavors. There are hundreds of flavors but Argentina's most traditional and popular one is dulce de leche, which has become popular abroad, especially in the US.

There are two kinds of heladerías in Argentina: the cheaper ones which sell ice cream with artificial ingredients (like Helarte, Pirulo, Sei Tu and the largest one, Grido), and the ones that sell helado artesanal, made with natural ingredients and usually distinguished by a logo featuring an ice cream cone and the letters HA. There are no regulations in Argentina regarding the amount of milk an ice cream can have. In fact, all ice cream parlors serve both cream-based and water-based ice cream (helado a la crema and helado al agua respectively). Instead, the distinctions are made according to the quality of the ingredients.

A standard Argentine cone or cup contains two different flavors of ice cream. In addition to these, most heladerías offer ice-cream-based desserts like Bombón Suizo (Swiss Bonbon: chocolate-covered chantilly ice cream filled with dulce de leche and sprinkled with nuts), Bombón Escocés (Scottish Bonbon: same as the Swiss Bonbon, only with chocolate ice-cream and white chocolate topping), Cassata (strawberry, vanilla and chocolate ice cream) and Almendrado (almond ice cream sprinkled with almond praline).

== Australia and New Zealand ==
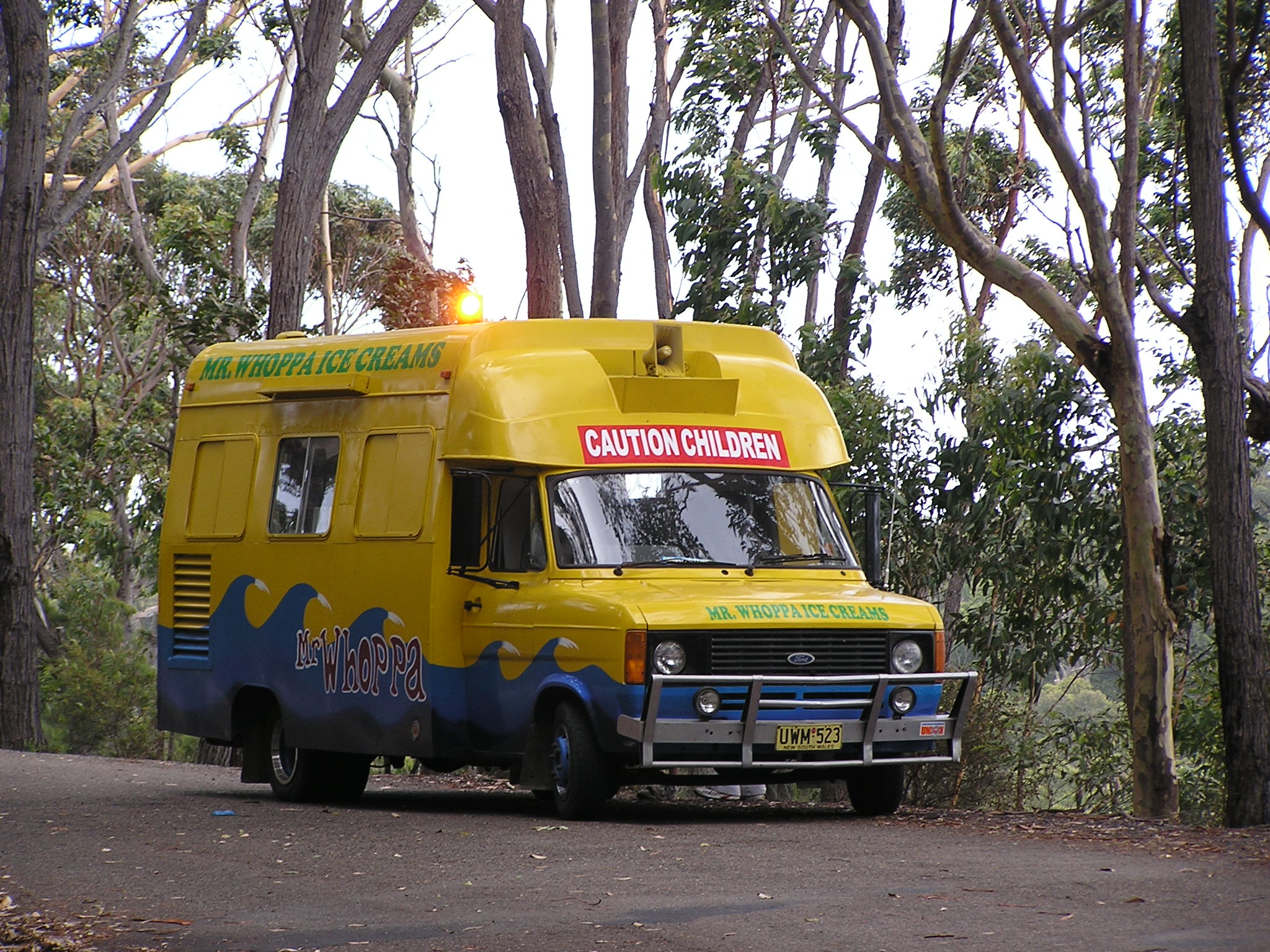
An ice cream van at Batemans Bay, New South Wales, Australia

Per capita, Australians and New Zealanders are among the leading ice cream consumers in the world, eating 18 litres and 20 litres each per year respectively, behind the United States where people eat 23 litres each per year. Brands include Tip Top, Streets, Peters, Sara Lee, New Zealand Natural, Cadbury, Baskin-Robbins and Bulla Dairy Foods.

Hokey pokey, which consists of vanilla ice cream with chunks of honeycomb is popular in New Zealand. The flavor is also popular in Australia and Japan.

Another New Zealand export is real fruit ice cream, which uses a special machine to blend vanilla ice cream and frozen fruit. The style has recently caught on in the United States, where it is sometimes made with more indulgent ingredients. Similarly, in recent years, Australian ice cream parlours and brands have begun experimenting with native Australian fruit flavours. A noteworthy example is how Connoisseur Ice Cream (a luxury ice cream brand owned by Peters) released a range of flavours that featured native fruits in 2019.

Goody Goody Gum Drops is a New Zealand flavour of ice cream. It is green, bubble gum flavoured, and laced with gum drops. It is considered to be a polarising flavour, with New Zealanders either loving or hating it.

== China, Hong Kong, Macao ==
Besides the flavors such as vanilla, chocolate, coffee, mango and strawberry, a number of Chinese ice-cream manufacturers have also introduced other traditional flavors such as black sesame, red beans.

In recent years, Hong Kong and Macao dessert houses have also served ice-cream moon cake during the Mid-Autumn festival (moon festival).

Fried ice cream is served at street food stalls in Beijing.

== Finland ==
The first ice cream manufacturer in Finland was the Italian Magi family, who opened the Helsingin jäätelötehdas in 1922 and Suomen Eskimo Oy. Other manufacturers soon spawned, like Pietarsaaren jäätelötehdas (1928–2002).

Finland's first ice cream bar opened at the Lasipalatsi in 1936, and at the same time another manufacturer, Maanviljelijäin Maitokeskus, started their production.

Today, the two largest ice cream manufacturers are Ingman and Nestlé (who bought Valiojäätelö). Finland is also the leading consumer of ice cream in Europe, with 13.7 litres per person in 2003.

== France ==
In 1651, François Procope opened an ice cream café in Paris and the product became so popular that during the next 50 years another 250 cafés opened in Paris. Some people eat heart or log shaped cakes made of ice cream on New Year's Eve or New Year's Day.

Places who make and sell ice cream in France are called glaciers. They sell ice-creams, called glaces in French, of different flavors and some of them are typically French. One of the most traditional is the glace plombières invented in 1815 and still popular in family events like weddings. The glace à la Chantilly made with chantilly are also common and were created during the 17th century. Another traditional ice-cream is the fontainebleau created in the 18th century near Paris. Nowadays French ice-creams with a base of fromage blanc are found especially in the countryside where farmers make artisanal fromage blanc.

Here are some traditional French recipes found in glaciers:

Café liégeois: sweetened coffee, coffee-flavored ice cream and chantilly cream.

Peach Melba: peaches and raspberry sauce with vanilla ice cream.

Bombe glacée: ice cream dessert frozen in a spherical mould.

Dame blanche: vanilla ice cream with whipped cream, and warm molten chocolate.

Poire belle Hélène: pears poached in sugar syrup served with vanilla ice cream and chocolate syrup.

Colonel: lemon sorbet with vodka.

Plombières: almond extract, kirsch, and candied fruit.

Vacherin glacé: a layer or two of meringue, topped with vanilla ice cream and raspberry sorbet and finished off with a Chantilly cream.

Omelette norvégienne: sponge cake, ice cream and meringue, hot on the outside and iced on the inside.

== Germany ==
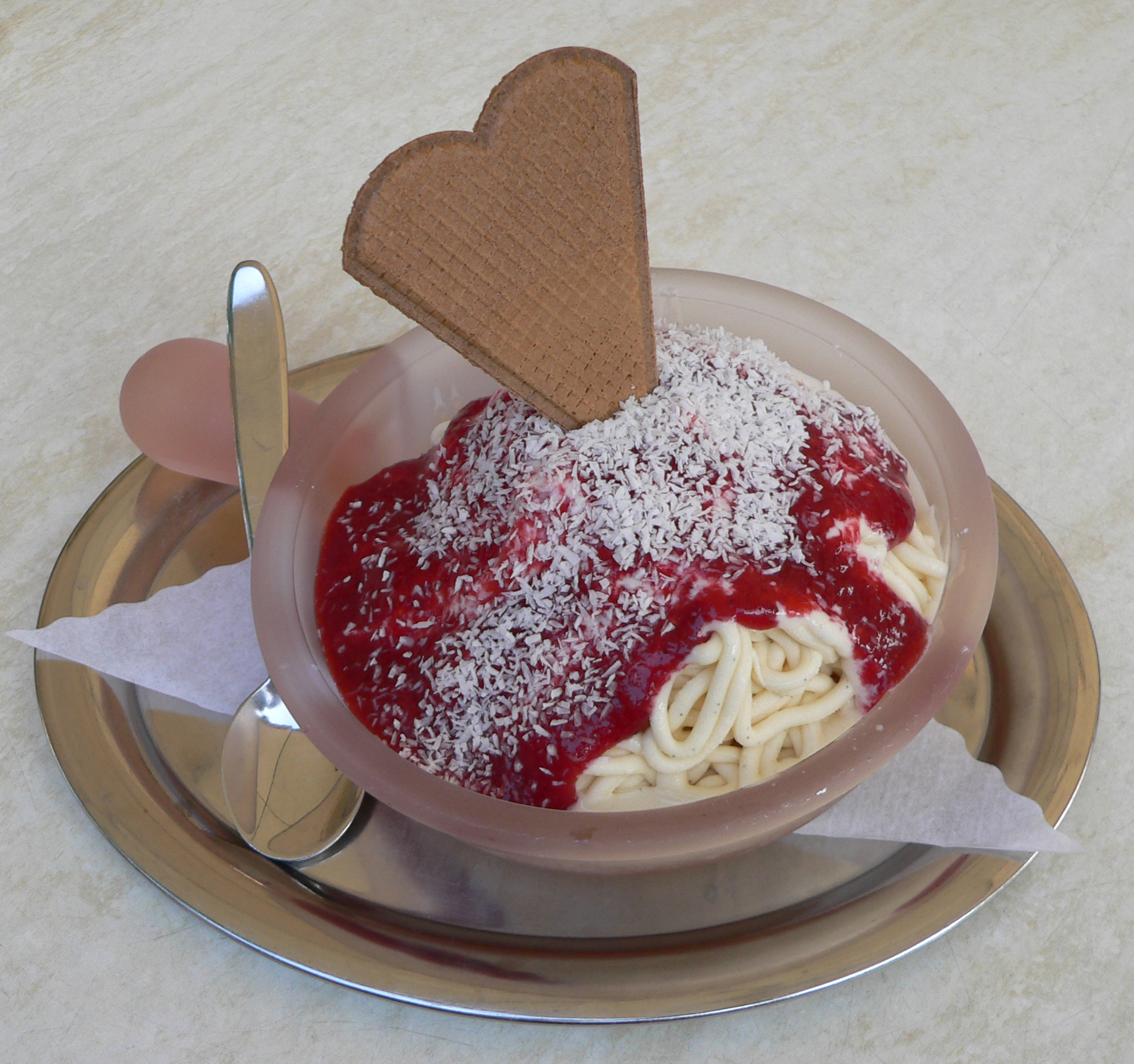
Spaghettieis, a German ice cream dish made to look like a plate of spaghetti

One of the first well known Italian ice cream parlors (Eisdiele) was founded in Munich in 1879 and run by the Sarcletti family. This traditional family business was handed from generation to generation ever since. Since the 1920s, when a number of Italians immigrated and set up business, the traditional ice cream parlors became popular. A popular German ice cream dish is Spaghettieis, created by Dario Fontanella in the 1960s and made to look like a plate of spaghetti.

About 80% percent of the ice cream sold in Germany is produced industrially, with the leading manufacturer being Unilever. About 17% is produced commercially and the remaining 3% is produced for the soft serve sector. In 2013, Germany had the largest market for ice cream in Europe at $2.7 billion revenue.

== Ghana ==
In 1962, the Ghanaian treat FanIce was created by the Fan Milk Limited Company. FanIce comes in strawberry, chocolate, and vanilla. FanMilk also makes additional products, though FanIce is the closest to Western ice cream. Pouches of FanIce and other FanMilk products can be bought from men on bikes equipped with chill boxes in any moderately sized town, and in cities large enough for grocery stores. FanMilk can also be bought in tubs for eating at home. In 2006, FanMilk was voted best ice-cream in the world.

== Great Britain ==
Lyons Maid, Walls are among the brand sold in Great Britain.

== Greece ==
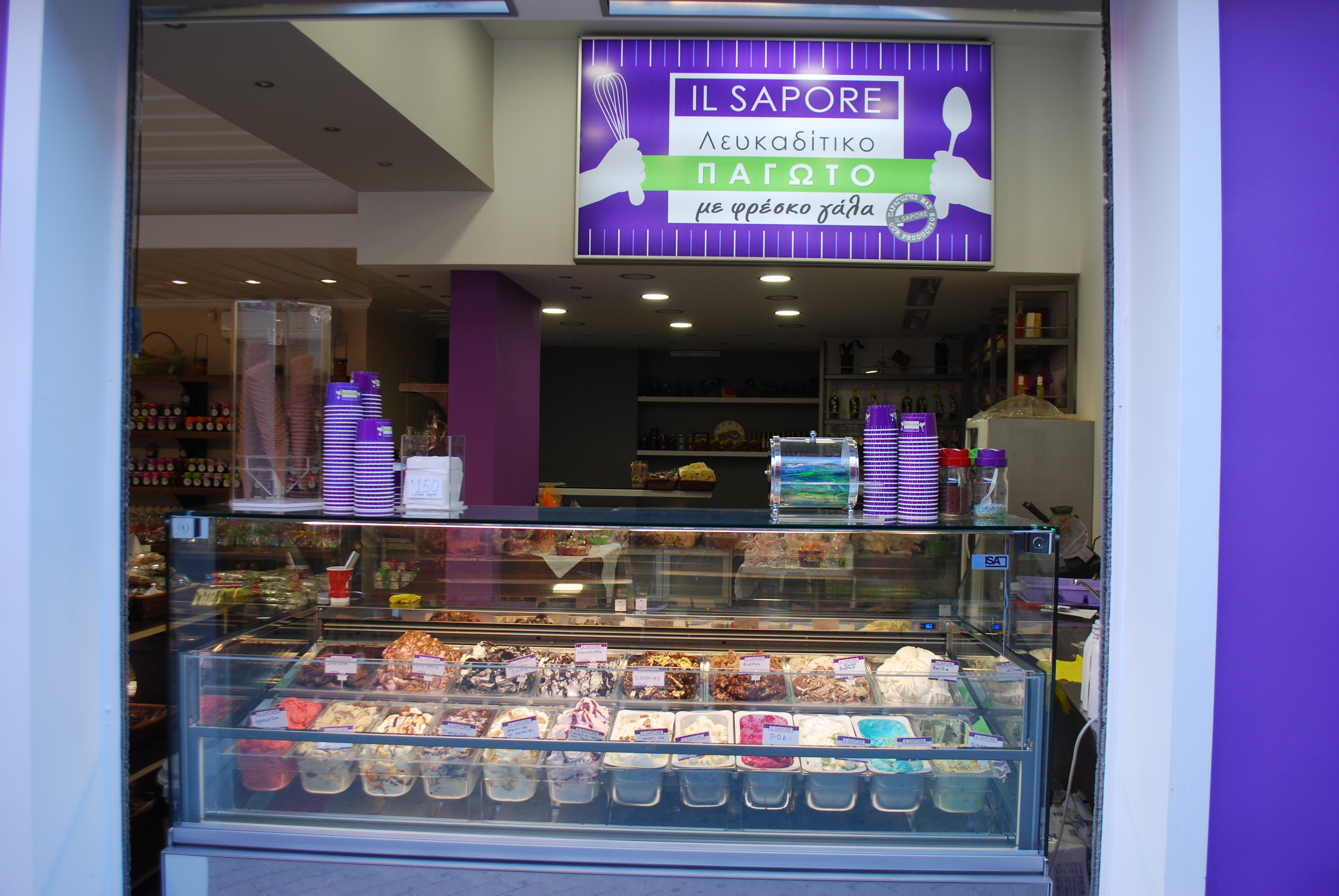
An ice cream shop in Lefkada

Ice cream in its modern form, or pagotó (Greek: παγωτό), was introduced in Greece along its development in Europe in the beginning of the 20th century. Earlier than that, ice treats have been enjoyed in the country since ancient times. During the 5th century BC, ancient Greeks ate snow mixed with honey and fruit in the markets of Athens. The father of modern medicine, Hippocrates, encouraged his Ancient Greek patients to eat ice "as it livens the lifejuices and increases the well-being." In the 4th century BC, it was well known that a favorite treat of Alexander the Great was snow ice mixed with honey and nectar. In the modern day, Greek ice cream has been heavily influenced by Turkish ice cream Dondurma; thus the name used to be called Dudurmas but, because of Greco-Turkish relations most Turkish related foods are coined a more Greek idiom. Greek ice cream recipes have some unique flavors such as Pagoto Kaimaki (Παγωτό Καϊμάκι), made from mastic resin which gives it an almost chewy texture, and Salepi, used as a thickening agent to increase resistance to melting, both giving a unique taste to the ice cream; Pagoto Elaeolado me syko (Ελαιόλαδο με σύκο), made of olive oil and figs; Pagoto Kataifi cocoa (Παγωτό Καταΐφι κακάο), made from the shredded filo dough pastry that resembles angel's hair pasta, similar to vermicelli but much thinner; and Pagoto Mavrodaphne (Μαυροδάφνη Παγωτό), made from a Greek dessert wine. Fruity Greek Sweets of the Spoon are usually served as toppings with Greek-inspired ice cream flavors.

== India ==
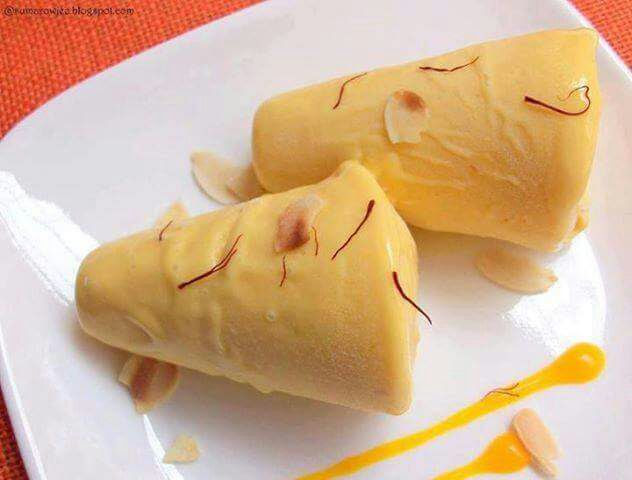
Saffron and mango flavored kulfi, one of its many varieties

India is one of the largest producers of ice cream in the world, but most of its ice cream is consumed domestically. India also has an ice cream dish known as "Kulfi" or "Matka Kulfi", which is famous in small towns and villages. Major brands are Amul, Havmor, Kwality Wall's, Vadilal, Mother Dairy, Sadguru Dadarwale etc. In recent times, multiple domestic ice cream companies have opened their exclusive outlets in metros and several international ice-cream companies also started their operation in India.

== Indonesia ==
In Indonesia there is a type of traditional ice cream called "Es Puter" or "stirred ice cream". It is made from the ingredients coconut milk, pandan leaves and sugar, with flavorings such as avocado, jackfruit, durian, palm sugar, chocolate, red bean, mung bean and various other flavors.

== Iran ==
Fālūde (Persian: فالوده) or Pālūde (Persian: پالوده) is a Persian sorbet made of thin vermicelli noodles frozen with corn starch, rose water, lime juice, and often ground pistachios. It is a traditional dessert in Iran and Afghanistan. It was brought to the Indian subcontinent during the Mughal period. The faloodeh of Shiraz is famous.

Faloodeh is one of the earliest forms of frozen desserts, having existed as early as 400 BC. Ice was brought down from high mountains and stored in tall refrigerated buildings called yakhchals, which were kept cool by windcatchers.

There is also a drink called faloodeh, but it is made using other ingredients.

- Bastani
- Sorbet

== Ireland ==
Irish brands are HB and Valley.

== Italy ==
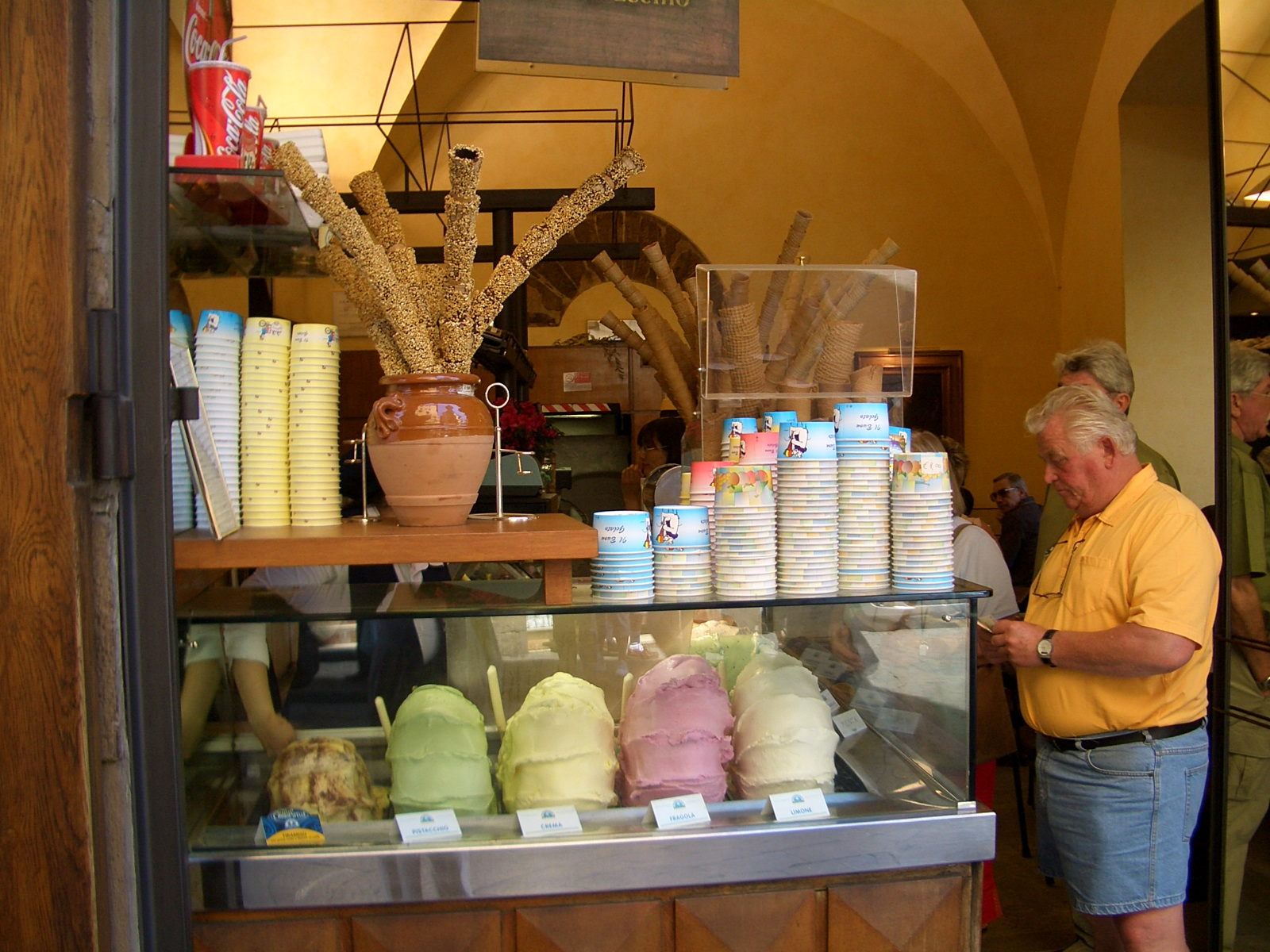
A gelato stall on Ponte Vecchio, Florence

Italian ice cream or Gelato as it is known, is a traditional and a popular dessert in Italy. Much of the production is still hand-made and flavored by each individual shop in "produzione propria" gelaterias. Gelato is made from whole milk, sugar, sometimes eggs, and natural flavorings. Gelato typically contains 7–8% fat. Before the cone became popular for serving ice cream, in English speaking countries, Italian street vendors would serve the ice cream in a small glass dish referred to as a "penny lick" or wrapped in waxed paper and known as a hokey-pokey (possibly a corruption of the Italian ecco un poco – "here is a little"). Some of the most known artisanal gelato machine makers are Italian companies Carpigiani, Crm-Telme, Corema-Telme, Technogel, Cattabriga and high capacity industrial plants made by Catta 27 and Cogil and Teknoice.

== Japan ==
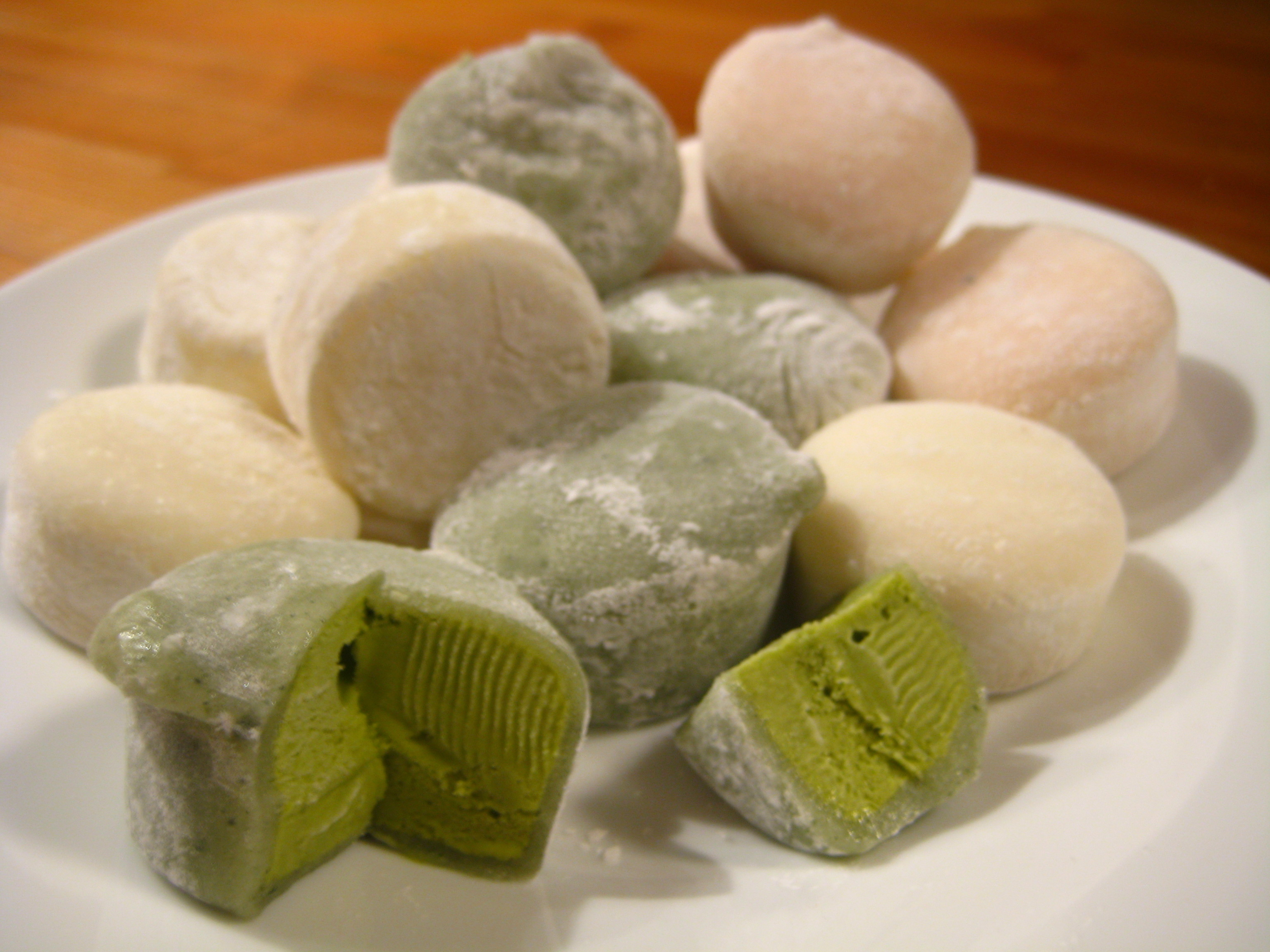
Mochi ice cream sold in Japan

Ice cream is a popular dessert in Japan, with almost two in five adults eating some at least once a week. From 1999 through 2006, the most popular flavors in Japan have been vanilla, chocolate, matcha (powdered green tea), and strawberry. Other notable popular flavors are milk, caramel, and azuki (red bean). Azuki is particularly favored by people in their 50s and older.

The Ministry of Health, Labour and Welfare classifies "ice cream and ice cream-like items" into three tiers (ice cream, ice milk, and lacto ice) based on dairy content. "Ice cream" must have at least 15% milk solids, including 8% milk fat, and can't contain non-dairy fats except those naturally present in ingredients like chocolate or egg yolk. "Ice milk" has lower requirements of at least 10% milk solids and 3% milk fat, and it may include non-dairy fats. "Lacto ice" needs only 3% milk solids with no milk fat required. Cheaper lacto ice products often use vegetable oils for fat.

- Kakigori

== Laos ==
A typical variety is Laotian vanilla ice cream made from pandan ("Laotian vanilla").

== Pakistan ==
Pakistan's most popular ice cream brands include OMORÉ, the products of which are exported to Europe and America, Igloo and the British company Wall's. Beside these, other large ice cream brands from Pakistan include Eat More Ice Cream and Yummy. These companies receive most of their profit from within the country. Pakistani Peshawari ice cream is famous in South Asia and Middle East.

The most popular flavors in Pakistan are pista, qulfi (spelt also as "qulfa", and in Punjabi with a "K-"), vanilla and chocolate.

== Philippines ==
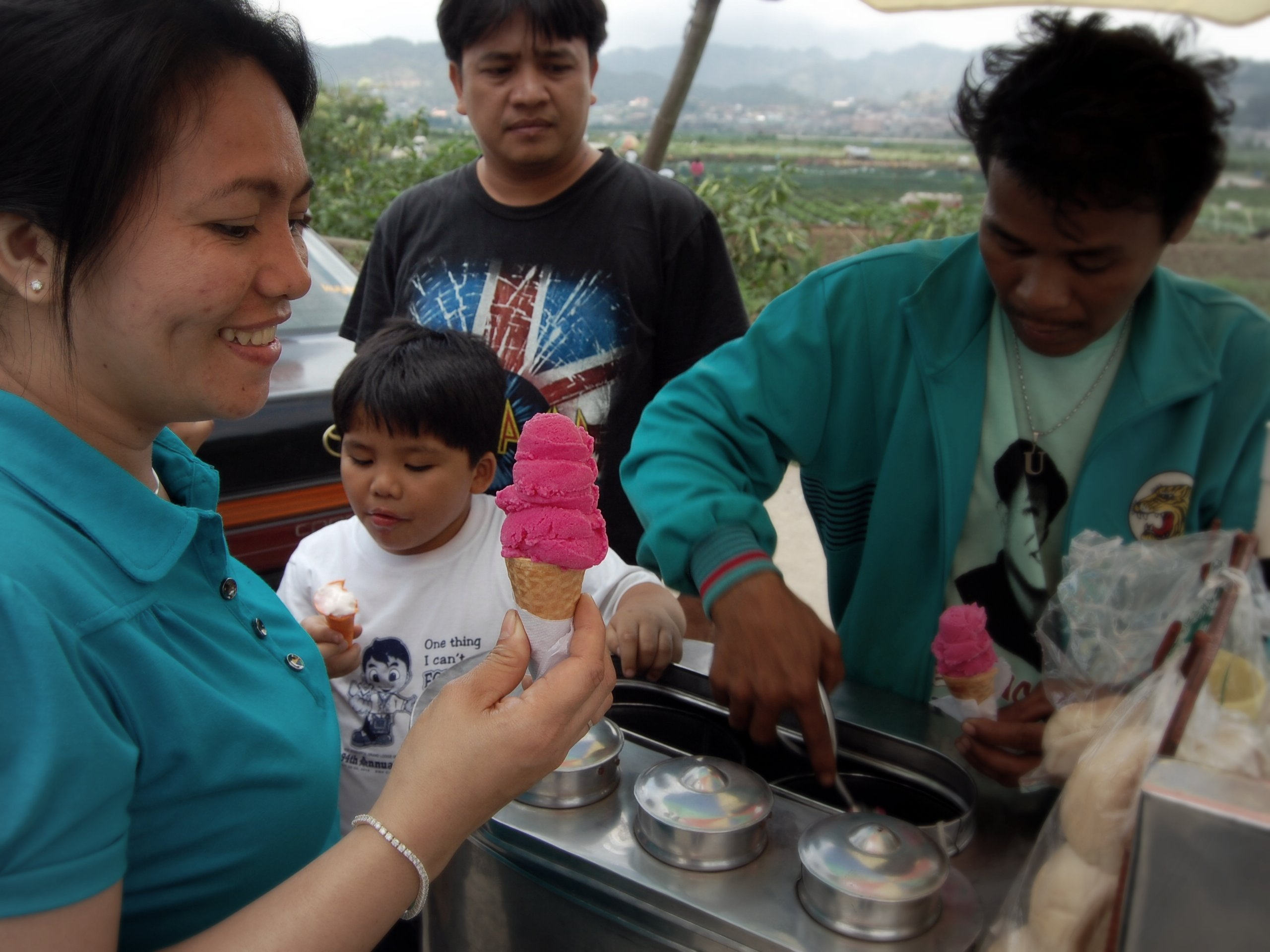
A woman purchasing strawberry sorbetes from a street vendor in the Philippines

Sorbetes is a Philippine version for common ice cream usually peddled from carts that roam streets in the Philippines. This should not be confused with the known sorbet. It is also commonly called 'dirty ice cream' because it is sold along the streets exposing it to pollution and that the factory where it comes from is usually unknown; though it is not really "dirty" as the name implies. It is usually served with small wafer or sugar cones and recently, bread buns. Popular ice cream flavors in the Philippines include ube ice cream made from ube (purple yam) and queso ice cream made from cheese.

== South Korea ==
Potato gelato, also known as Yangyang ice cream, is a type of ice cream made from potato and pepper. It originated in Gangwon Province, South Korea. It is made out of potatoes grown in the Gangwon Province and is a speciality there. Potato gelato was developed with potatoes grown in Yangyang, or Lato Layo.

It was created to promote the taste of Gangwon-do, using the specialities of the province as ingredients. Potato gelato is made by churning potatoes that are a speciality of Gangwon-do itself. The gelato is made by using natural ingredients from the Gangwon-do province. Pepper is sprinkled over the potato ice cream, thus earning the name of potato-pepper gelato.

== Spain ==
Ice cream, in the style of Italian gelato, can be found in cafes or specialty ice cream stores throughout Spain. Usually the flavors reflect local tastes such as nata, viola, crema catalana, or tiramisu.

There are also industrial producers such as Frigo (owned by Unilever), Camy (later merged into Nestlé), Avidesa, Menorquina, a number of them are part of transnational groups. The industrial producers also serve ice cream sandwiches and polos, ice cream on a stick, such as Magnum, sometimes with whimsical shapes like the foot-shaped Frigopié.

Ice cream is consumed mostly in summer. Hence, some ice cream stores become hot-chocolate cafés in winter.

== Syria ==
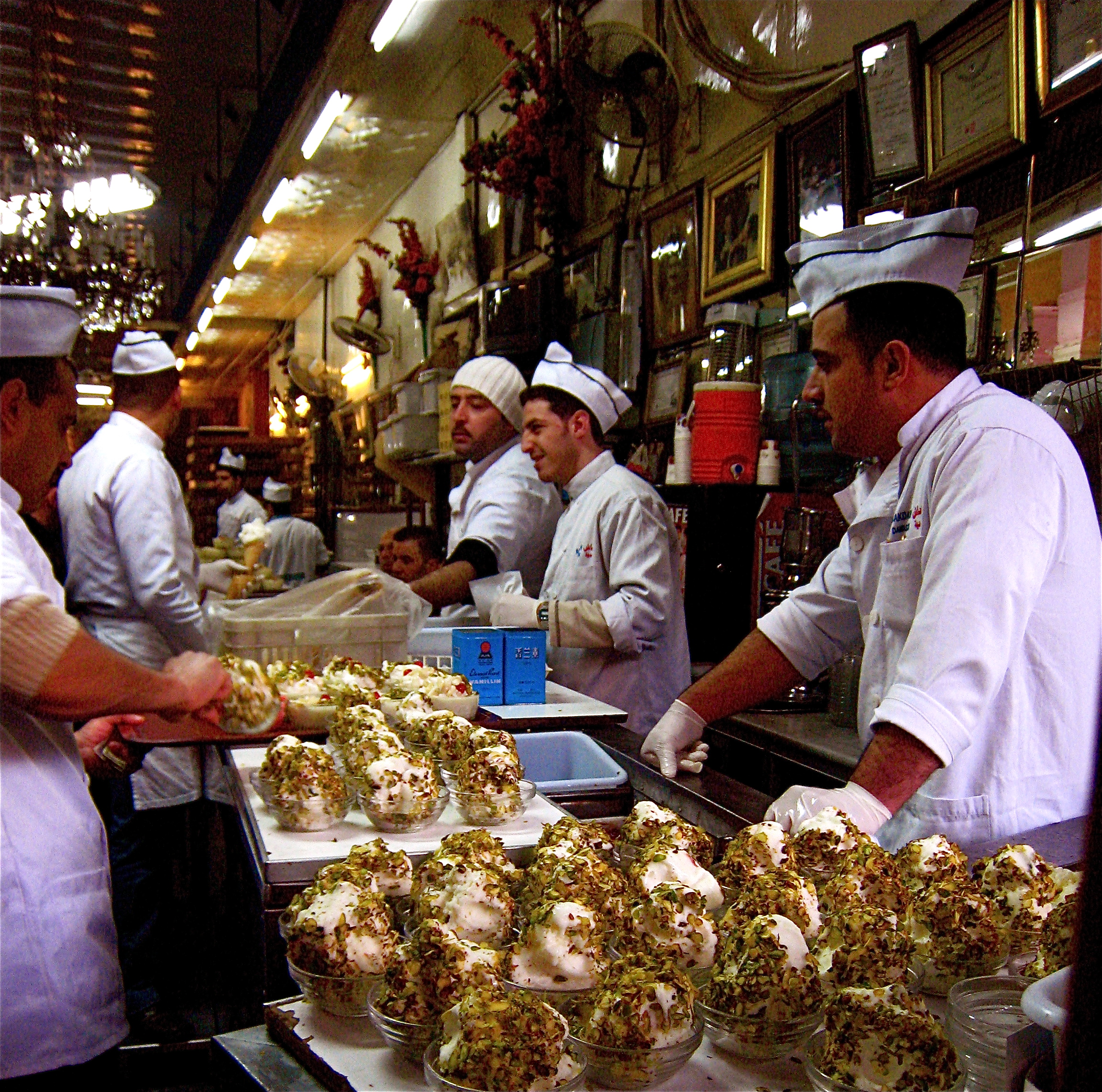
Booza being sold in the Bakdash ice cream shop in the Al-Hamidiyah Souq in Old city of Damascus

Booza (الآيس كريم واللبن in Arabic: "milk ice cream", also called "Arabic ice cream") is a mastic-based ice cream. It is elastic, sticky, and resistant to melting in the hotter climates of the Arab world, where it is most commonly found.

The ice cream is usually and traditionally made with an ingredient called sahlab (سَحْلَب) or salep, which provides it with the ability to resist melting. Salep is also a primary ingredient in the Turkish version of this style of ice cream called dondurma.

== Taiwan ==
A traditional Taiwanese vegetarian dessert commonly sold at night markets and temple fairs is Peanut ice cream roll (Chinese: 花生捲冰淇淋; Tongyong Pinyin: Hūa shēng jǔan bīng cí líng; Tâi-lô: thôo-tāu-hu-kńg-ōo-ping).It is especially associated with Yilan County, where it is regarded as a local specialty. The dessert consists of a thin wheat-based wrapper similar to that used for lūn-piánn (Chinese: 潤餅), which is filled with shaved peanut brittle bound with malt sugar, scoops of ice cream, and fresh coriander. The wrapper is folded into a roll, resembling a spring roll in both appearance and preparation. Taro-flavored ice cream is the most common filling, though pineapple, plum, and other flavors are also used.

Another famous ice cream in Taiwan is called "Babu" (Chinese: 叭噗). Babu is a traditional Taiwanese ice cream that does not use dairy or emulsifiers. Instead, fresh ingredients are cooked with sugar, after which powdered starches such as tapioca are added to thicken the mixture and give it a cohesive texture. Babu melts more slowly than Western-style ice cream and has a denser texture.

== Turkey ==
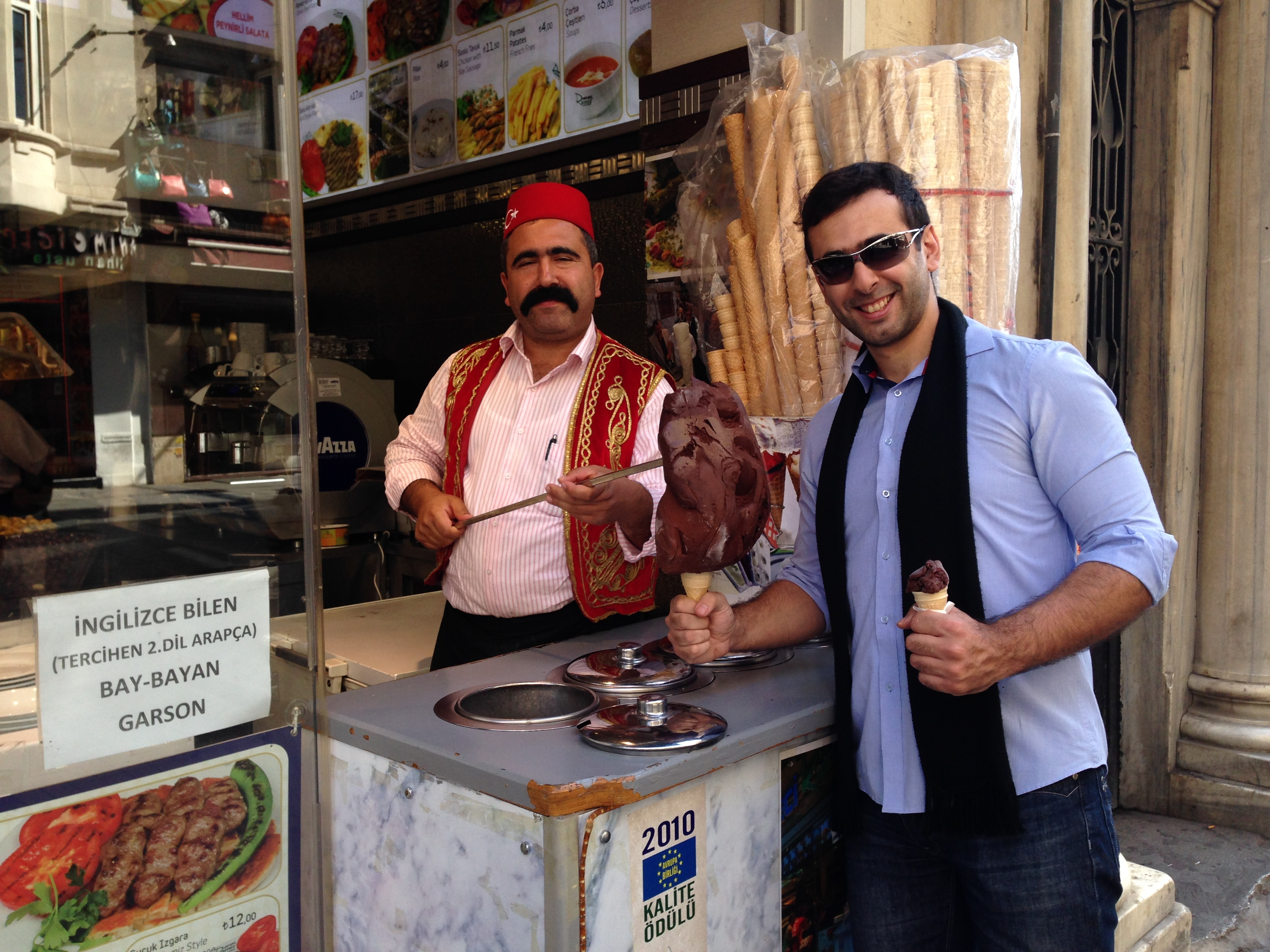
A man purchasing dondurma from a street vendor in Turkey

Dondurma (in Turkish: Maraş dondurması, meaning "the ice cream of the city of Maraş", also called Dövme dondurma, meaning "battered ice cream") is a Turkish mastic ice cream. It is similar to the Syrian dessert booza.

Dondurma typically includes the ingredients cream, whipped cream, salep, mastic, and sugar. It is believed to originate from the city and region of Maraş and hence also known as Maraş ice cream.

Mastic ice cream frequently accompanies Lor Tatlısı, a low-fat curdle cheese based dessert.

== United States ==
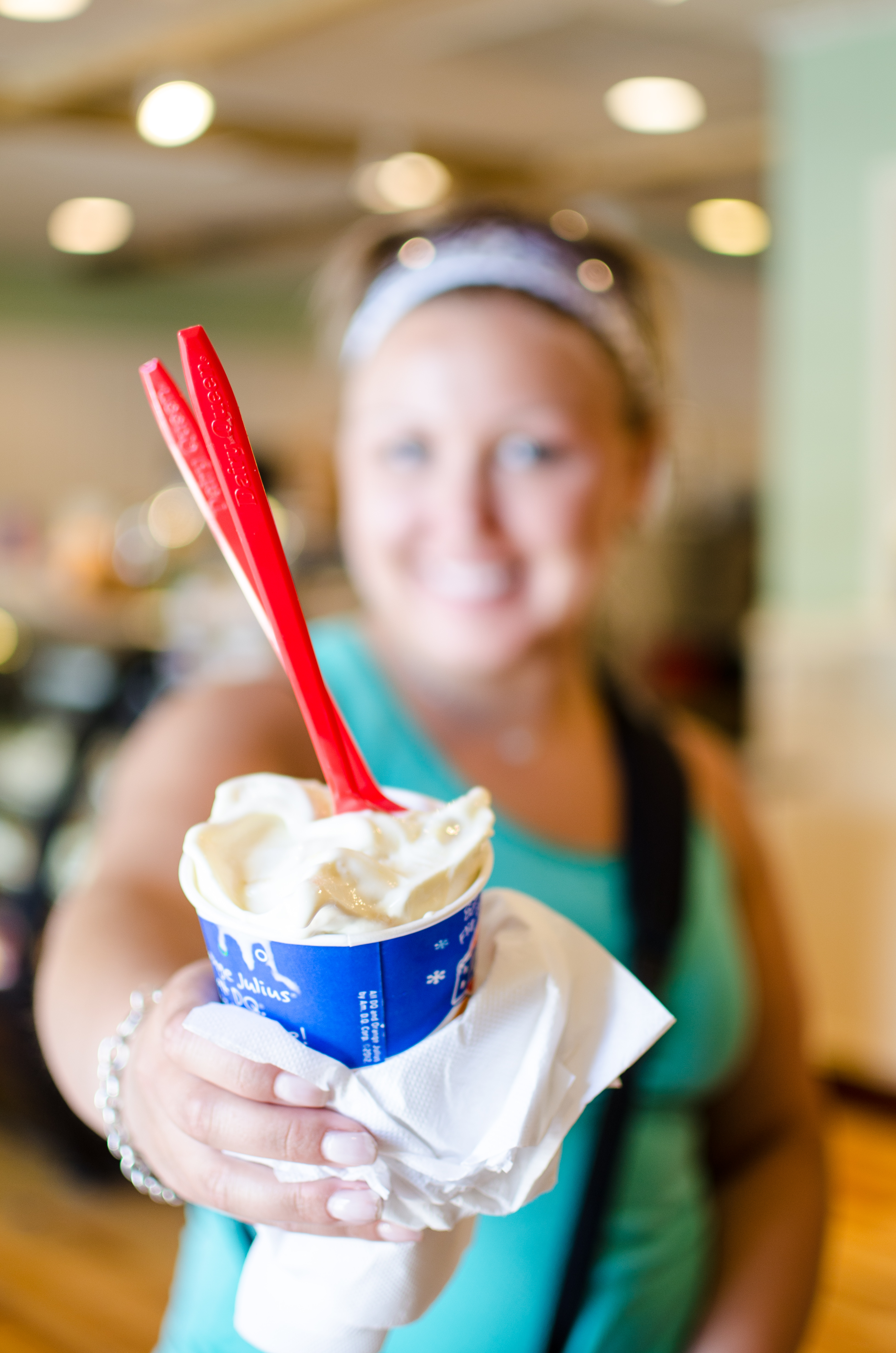
A woman in South Dakota holding a Dairy Queen Blizzard, a commercial mix-in

In the United States, ice cream made with just cream, sugar, and a flavoring (usually fruit) is sometimes referred to as "Philadelphia style" ice cream. Ice creams made with eggs, usually in the form of frozen custards, are sometimes called "French" ice creams or traditional ice cream.

American federal labeling standards require ice cream to contain a minimum of 10% milk fat (about 7 grams (g) of fat per 1/2 cup [120 mL] serving), 20% total milk solids by weight, to weigh no less than 4.5 pounds per gallon (in order to put a limit on replacing ingredients with air), and to contain less than 1.4% egg yolk solids. Federal government regulations pertaining to the process of making ice cream, allowable ingredients, and standards, may be found in Part 135 of Title 21 of the Code of Federal Regulations.

Americans consume about 23 liters of ice cream per person per year—the most in the world. As a foodstuff it is deeply ingrained into the American psyche and has been available in America since its founding in 1776: there are records of Thomas Jefferson serving it as a then-expensive treat to guests at his home in Monticello. In American supermarkets it is not uncommon for ice cream and related products to take up a wall full of freezers. All different kinds of ice cream fill the walls with strawberry, chocolate, vanilla, among other flavors.

Although chocolate, vanilla, and strawberry are the traditional favorite flavors of ice cream, and once enjoyed roughly equal popularity, vanilla has grown to be the most popular, most likely because of its use as a topping for fruit based pies and its use as the key ingredient for milkshakes. According to the International Ice Cream Association (1994), supermarket sales of ice cream break down as follows: vanilla, 28%; fruit flavors, 15%; nut flavors, 13.5%; candy mix-in flavors, 12.5%; chocolate, 8%; cake and cookie flavors, 7.5%; Neapolitan, 7%; and coffee/mocha, 3%. Other flavors combine to make 5.5%. Sales in ice cream parlors are more variable, as new flavors come and go, but about three times as many people call vanilla their favorite compared to chocolate, the runner-up.
