= Pistachio ice cream =

Ice cream flavor made with pistachio nuts or flavoring

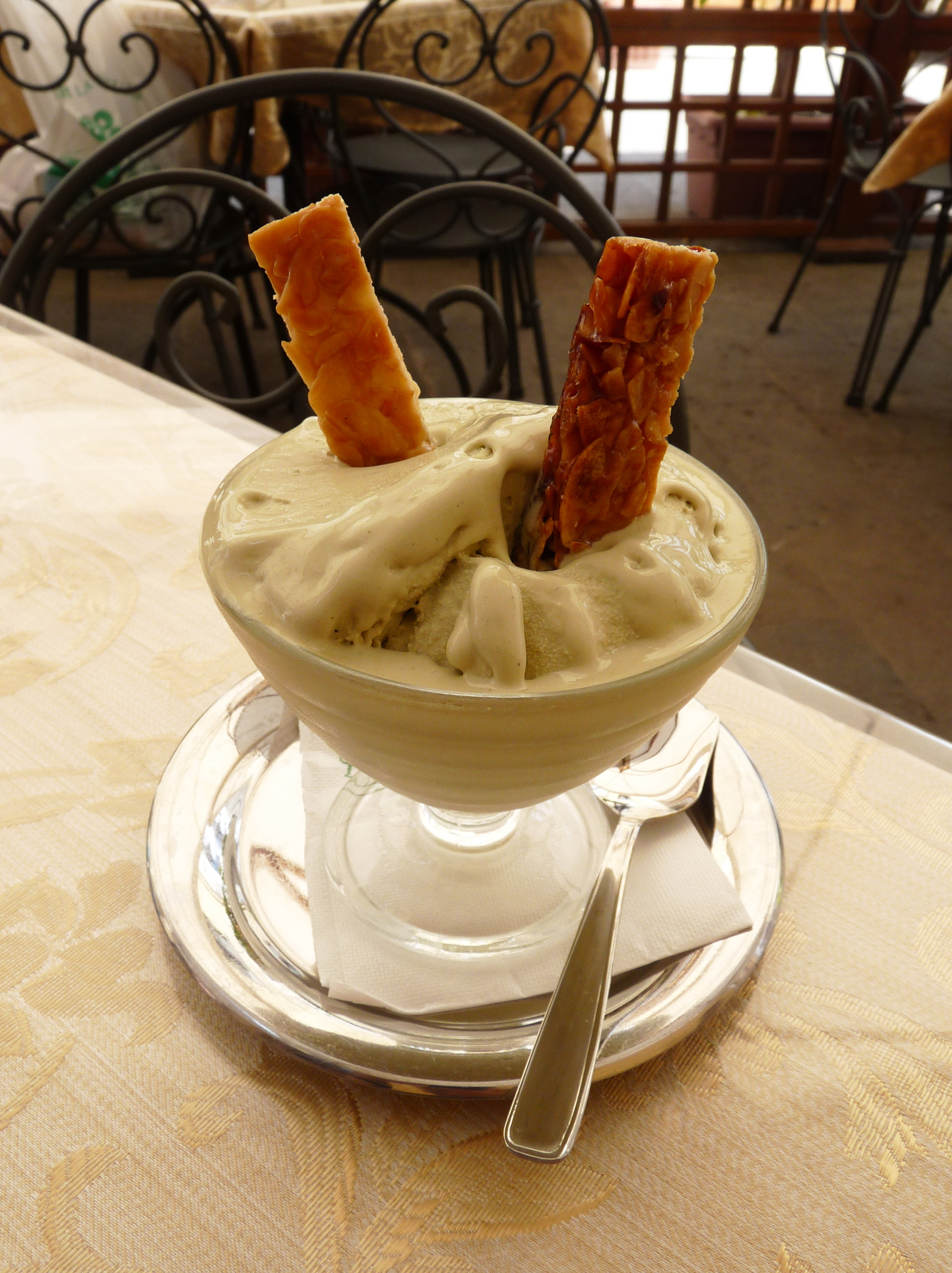
Pistachio gelato from Lipari in the Aeolian Islands of Sicily

Pistachio ice cream or pistachio nut ice cream is an ice cream flavor made with pistachio nuts or flavoring. It is often distinctively green in color. Pistachio is also a flavor of sorbet and gelato. Pistachio ice cream is a layer in spumoni.

At the Bakdash in Damascus, Syria, a pounded ice cream covered with pistachio called Booza is produced. It has an elastic texture made of mastic and sahlab and is famous around the Arab World. Tripoli's Al Mina district is known for its Arabic ice cream including "ashta" with pistachios.

It is widely produced including by Brigham's Ice Cream, Ben & Jerry's, Graeter's and major brands.

== Gallery ==
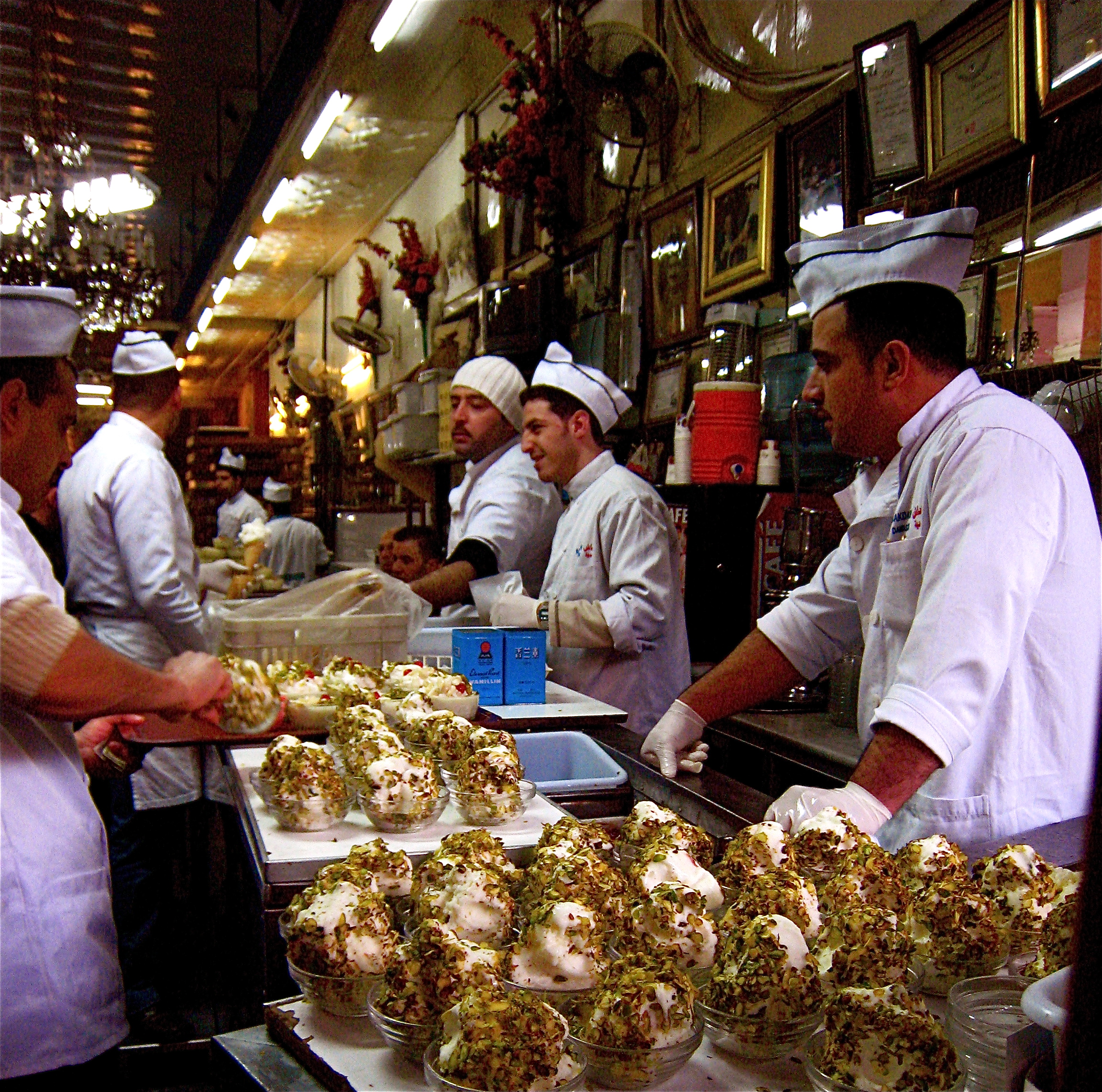
Bakdash (ice cream parlor) in the old souk in Damascus, Syria

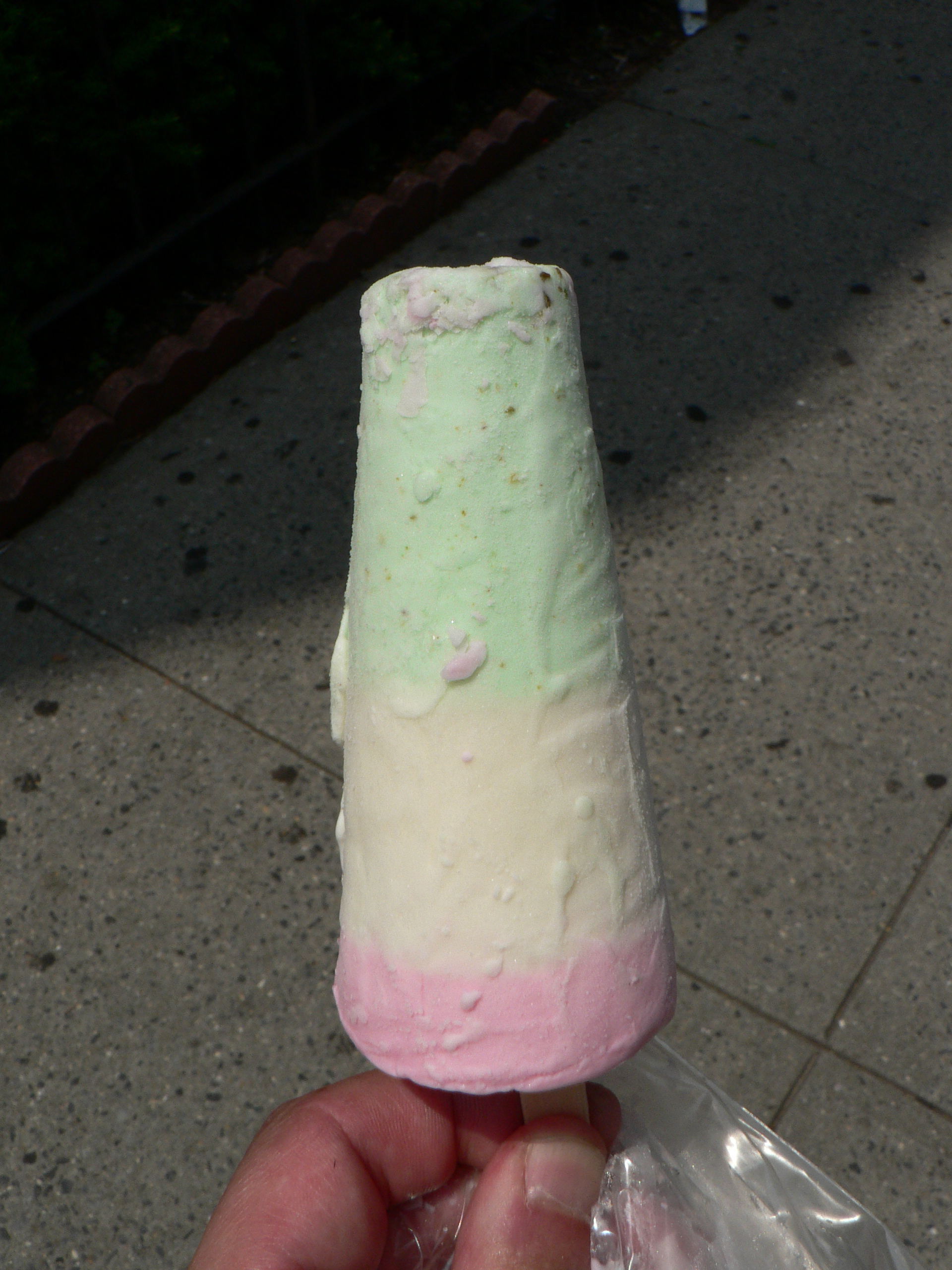
Pistachio, vanilla and rosewater kulfi from a vendor in Jackson Heights, Queens in New York City

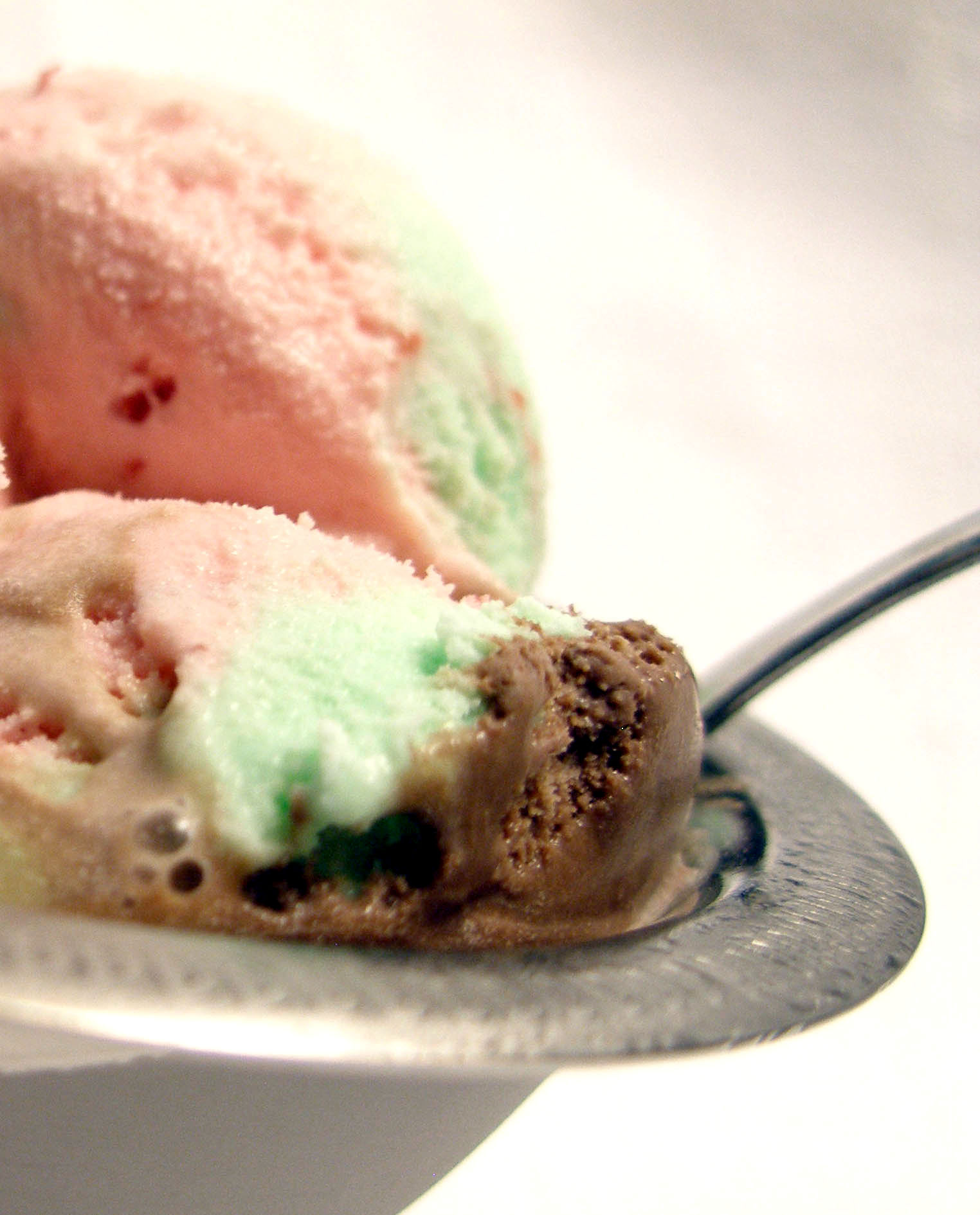
Spumoni includes a layer of pistachio ice cream

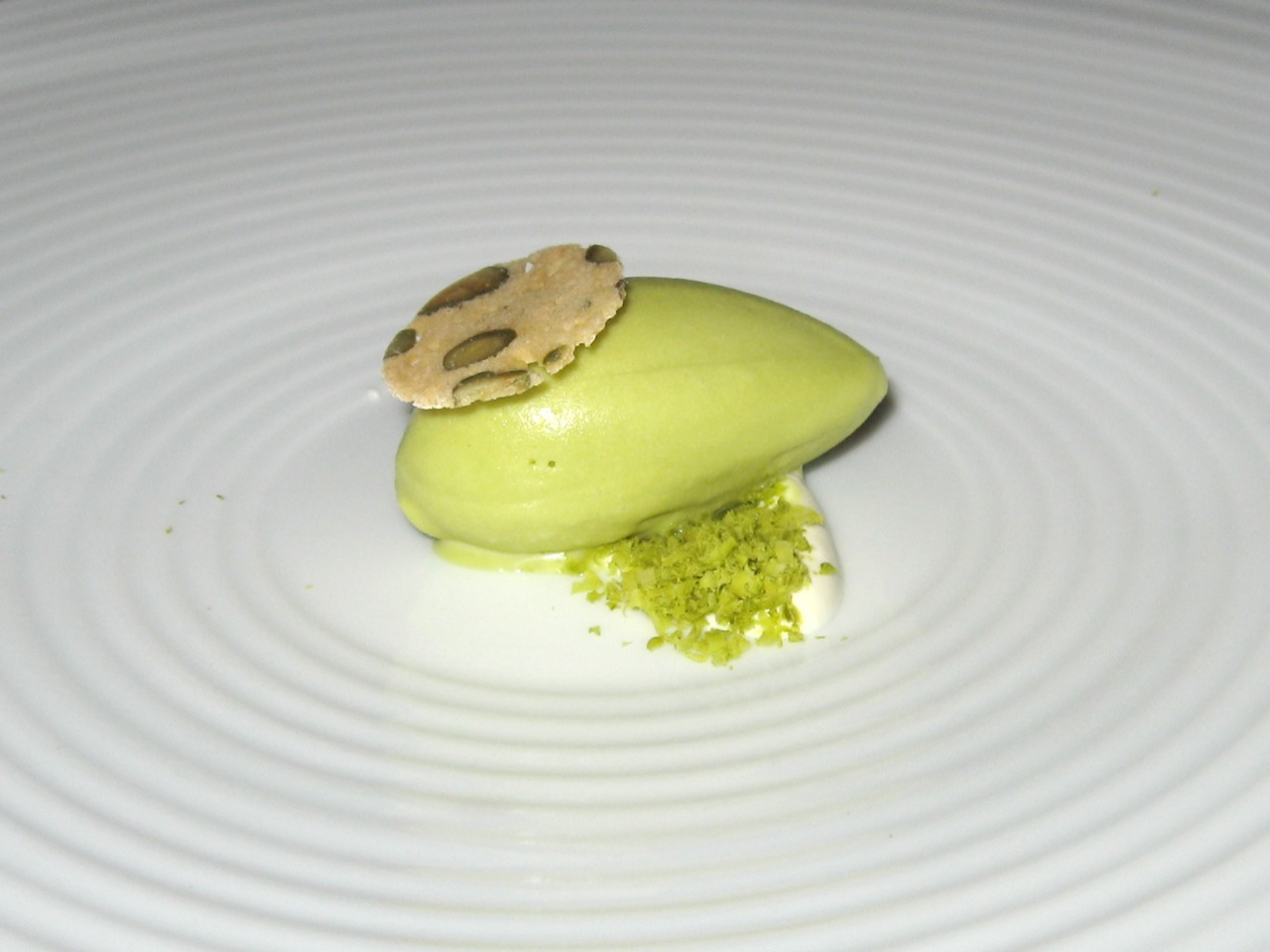
Pistachio ice cream over whipped mascarpone topped with pistachio biscotti

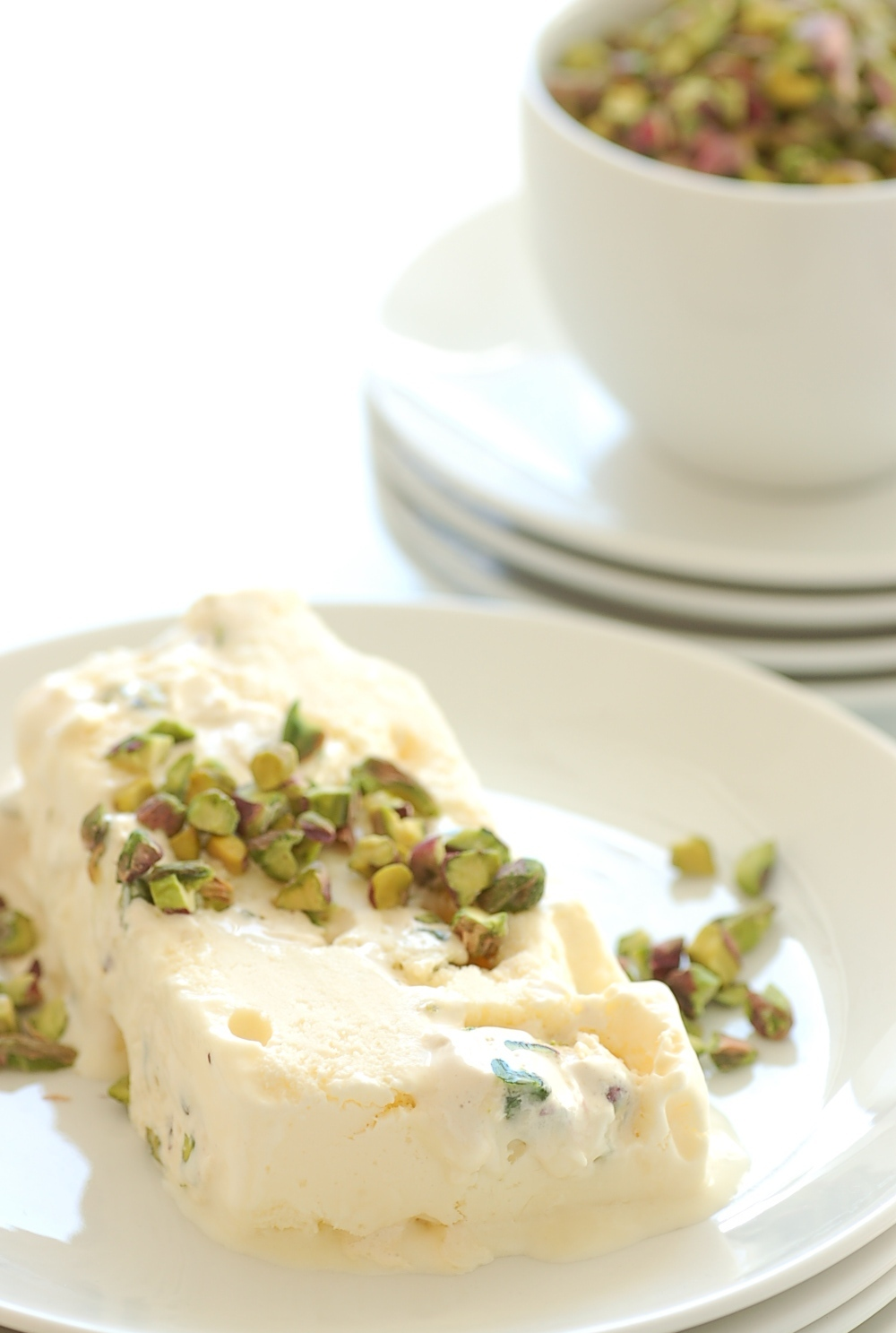
Pistachio nougat ice cream

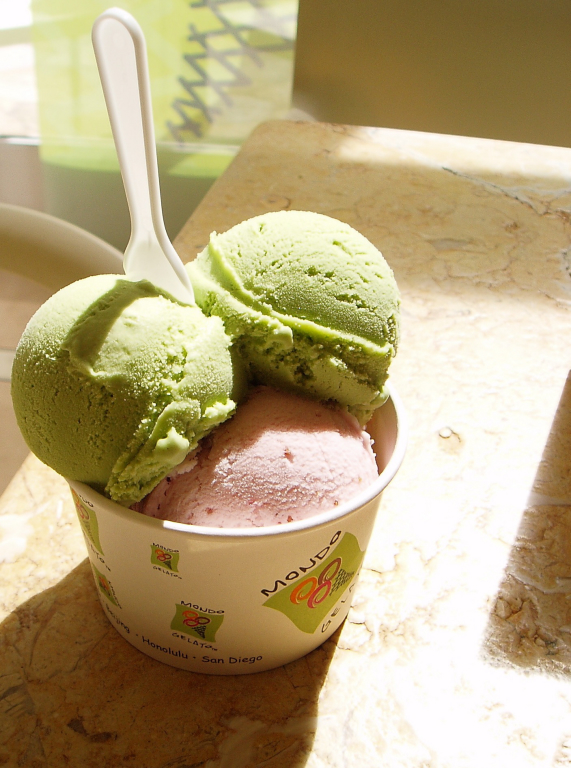
Pistachio and strawberry ice cream

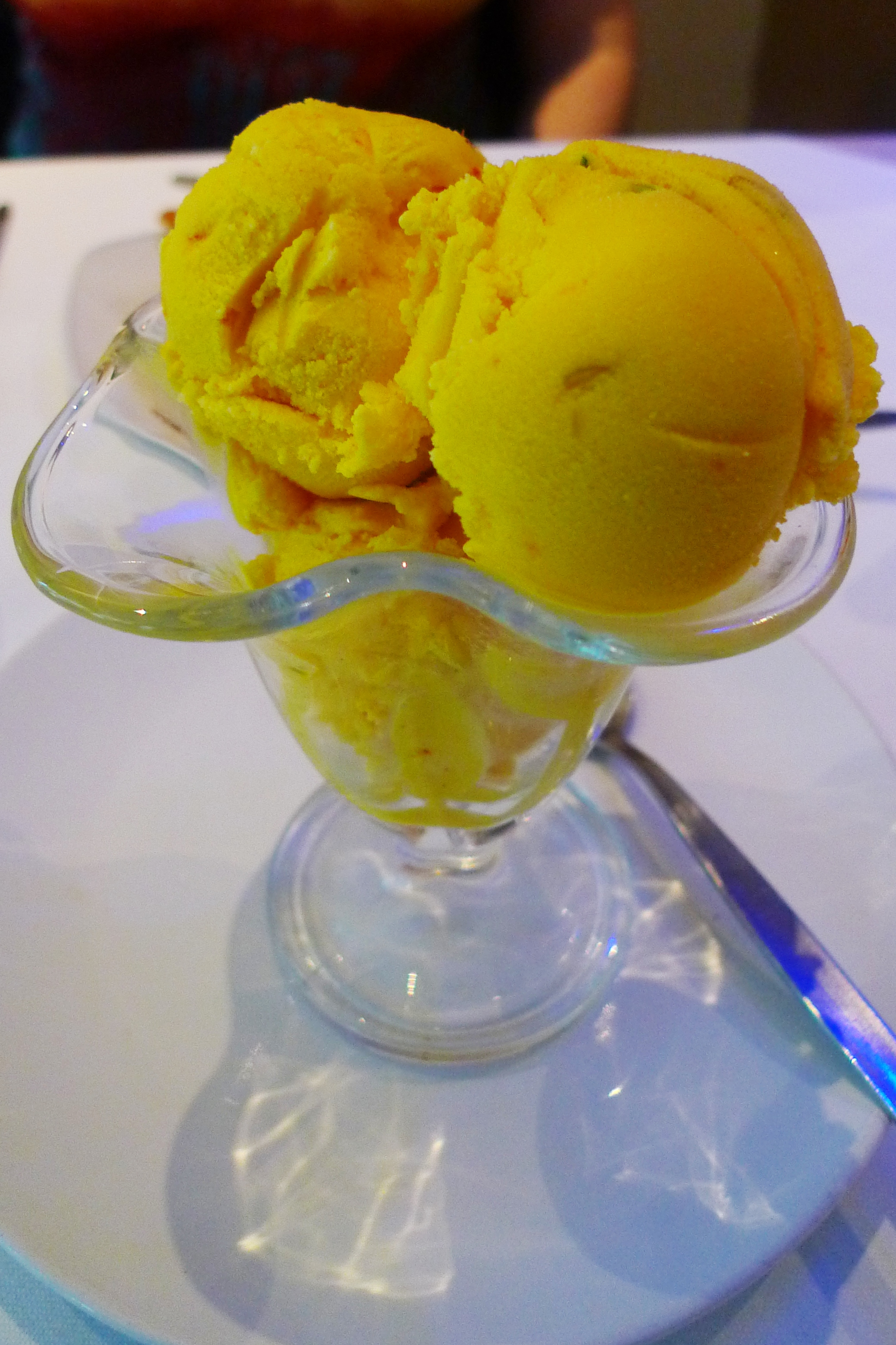
Persian bastani made with saffron and pistachio from Gilak on Holloway Road in Archway, London
