= Bakdash =

Bakdash may refer to:

- Bakdash (ice cream parlor), in Damascus, Syria
- Ammar Bakdash (1954–2025), Syrian politician and economist
- Khalid Bakdash (1912–1995), leader of the Syrian Communist Party from 1936 to 1995
