= Dondurma =

Turkish-style ice cream

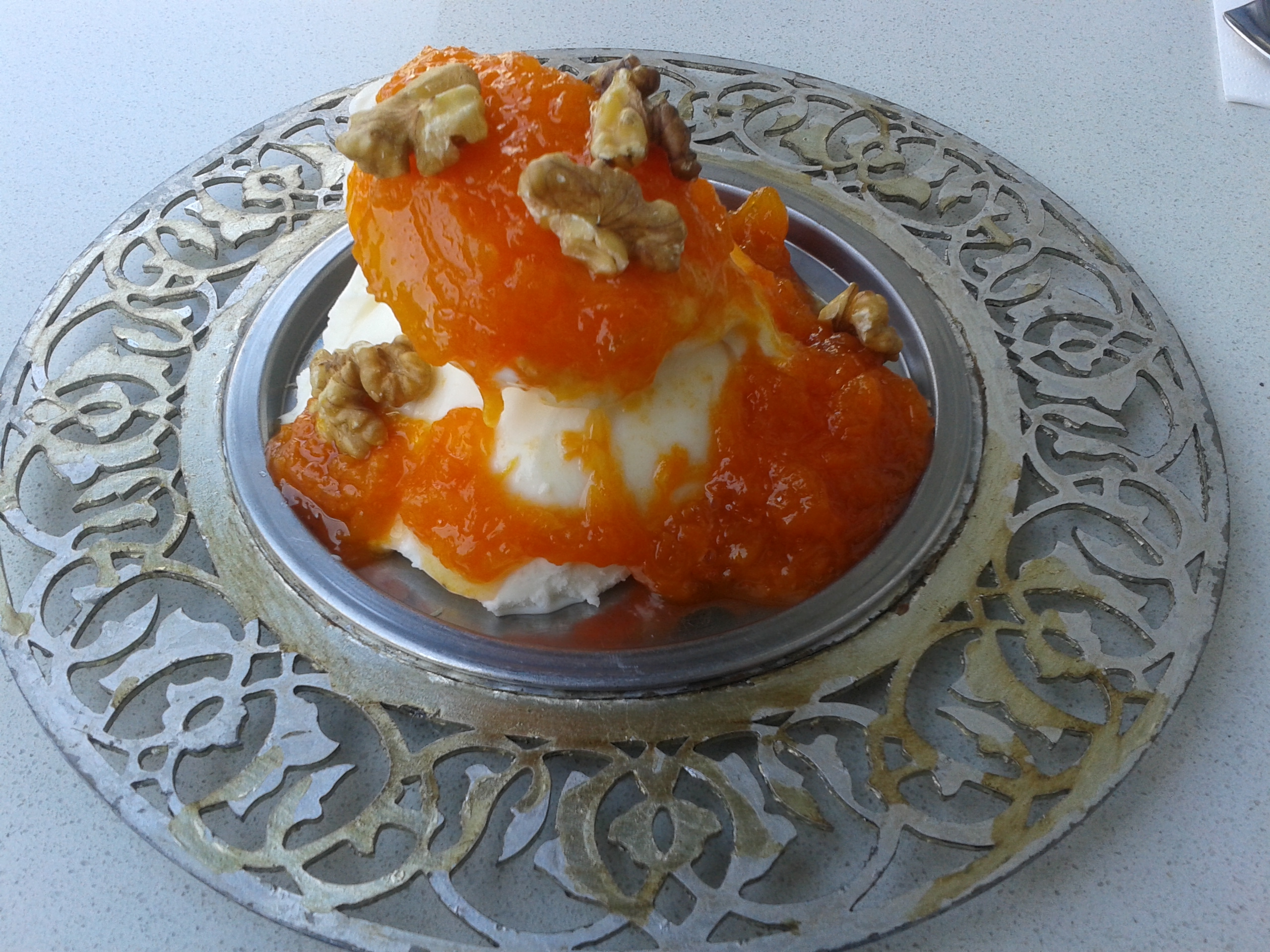
- Dondurma topped with walnuts and pumpkin sauce
- Type: Ice cream
- Place of origin: Turkey
- Main ingredients: Cream, whipped cream, salep, mastic, sugar

Dondurma is the Turkish name for ice cream, while Booza (Arabic: بُوظَة, romanized: Būẓah, lit. 'ice cream') is the Arabic name for ice cream. Outside of the Middle East, it typically refers specifically to mastic ice cream, which is often believed to originate from the city and region of Kahramanmaraş and is known as maraş dondurma in Turkish. (Note: In Turkish: Maraş dondurması, meaning "the ice cream of the city of Kahramanmaraş", also called Dövme dondurma, meaning "battered ice cream") This ice cream is made from cream, salep (the ground-up tuber of an orchid), mastic (plant resin), and sugar.

== Description ==
Two qualities distinguish Middle Eastern ice cream: hard texture and resistance to melting, brought about by inclusion of the thickening agents salep, a flour made from the root of the early purple orchid, and mastic, a resin that imparts chewiness. The strand-like texture is sometimes mistakenly attributed to mastic rather than salep.

== Regional varieties ==
=== The Levant ===
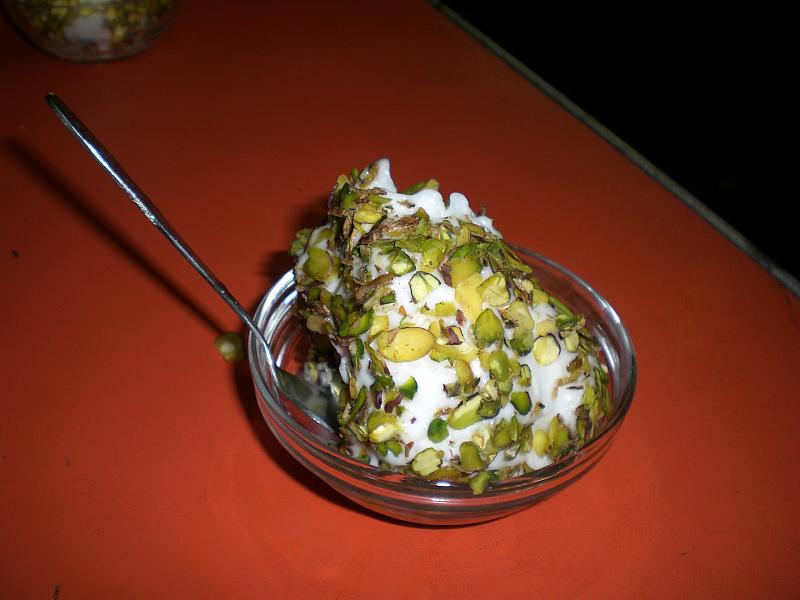
A dish of booza topped with pistachios served at the Bakdash ice cream shop in Damascus

Booza (Arabic: بُوظَة, romanized: Būẓah, lit. 'ice cream') is a frozen dairy dessert. It is traditionally made through a process of pounding and stretching in a freezer drum, instead of the more usual churning method used in other ice creams, leading to a creamy yet dense texture. Orange flower water or rose water are sometimes added for flavoring. The firmness of booza allows it to be shaped into a roll, which is a popular traditional serving method. It is often served with qishta. It shares an origin with the Turkish dondurma.

In Al-Hamidiyah Souq in the Old City of Damascus, there is an ice cream store named Bakdash that is known throughout the Arab world for its stretchy and chewy ice cream. It is a popular attraction for tourists as well. Booza has been made by Bekdash since at least 1895.

Mastic flavored salep-based booza is made in Jordan. It is also made in Ramallah, in the West Bank by different brands, having spread there from Damascus.

Internationally, the first packaged take-home version of booza in Australia was created in 2011. Booza vendors can be found outside the Levant region in areas like the Bay Area and Williamsburg, Brooklyn in the US, and Sydney, Australia.

=== Turkey ===
The Kahramanmaraş region is known for Maraş dondurması, a variety which contains distinctly more salep than usual. Tough and sticky, it is sometimes eaten with a knife and fork.

=== Greece ===
Α distinct variation of dondurma is also consumed in Greece, especially in the north of the country, where it is called "dudurmas" or "kaimaki".

== History ==
Food historian Priscilla Mary Işın wrote in Ottoman Culinary Dictionary that it is unknown when salep-based milk dondurma was first made, though she notes that the earliest recipe dates back to 1882. The 1882 recipe appeared in a cookbook titled Ev Kadını credited to Ayse Fahriye. The recipe calls for combining sugar, milk, and salep in pot on heat, mixing it until the milk boils, snow is then added, and the mixture is moved to a different container and beaten vigorously to attain the desired texture before it is served. Mary Işın also notes the diverging traditions of making ice cream: Italian recipes of the time used eggs to thicken ice cream where as the Turkish recipe used salep.

The salep-based ice cream was made in a container made of lead and tin, fitted with a lid containing a turning mechanism, and a larger bucket with a drain tap in which the container was placed, the container had a "crank mechanism" that allowed the ice cream mixture to be stirred continuously without opening the lid.

== Culture ==
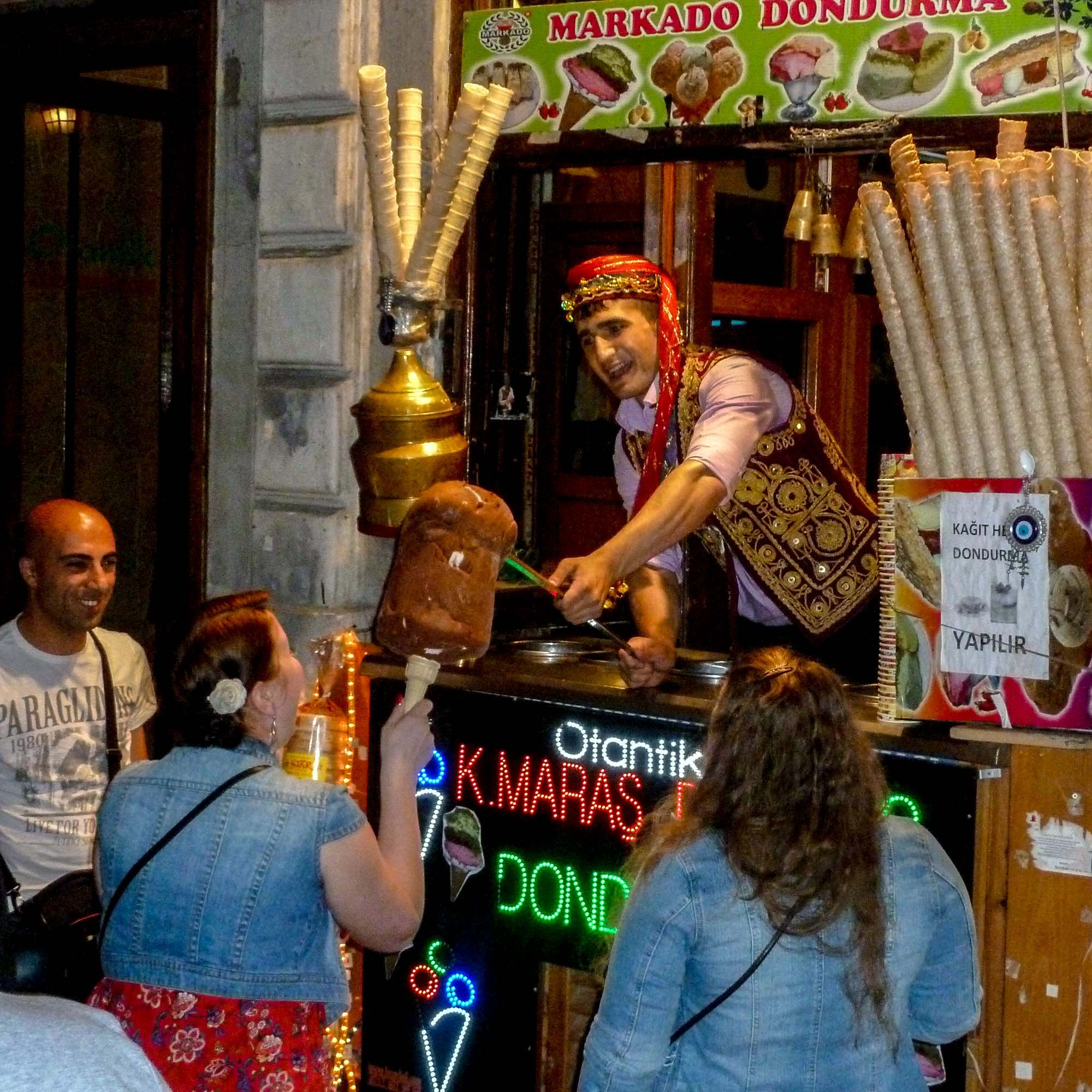
Dondurma vendor performing a trick, presenting an entire container's worth of ice cream atop a single cone

Dondurma is commonly sold from both street vendors' carts and store fronts, where the mixture is churned regularly with long-handled paddles to keep it workable. Vendors often perform magic tricks and practical jokes, with examples including presenting the ice cream cone on a long stick or pole, and then taking away the dondurma by rotating it around, or serving it with an extra cone that comes away from the actual cone when the stick is lifted. These tricks serve the additional purpose of attracting prospective customers, as well as entertaining people waiting in line.

== Consumption ==
As of 2010, the average rate of consumption in Turkey was 2.8 liters of ice cream per person per year (compared to the United States at 14.2 liters per person and world consumption leader Australia at 17.9 liters in 2010).

The popularity of salepli dondurma has caused a decline of wild orchids in the region and led to a ban on exports of salep.

== Gallery ==
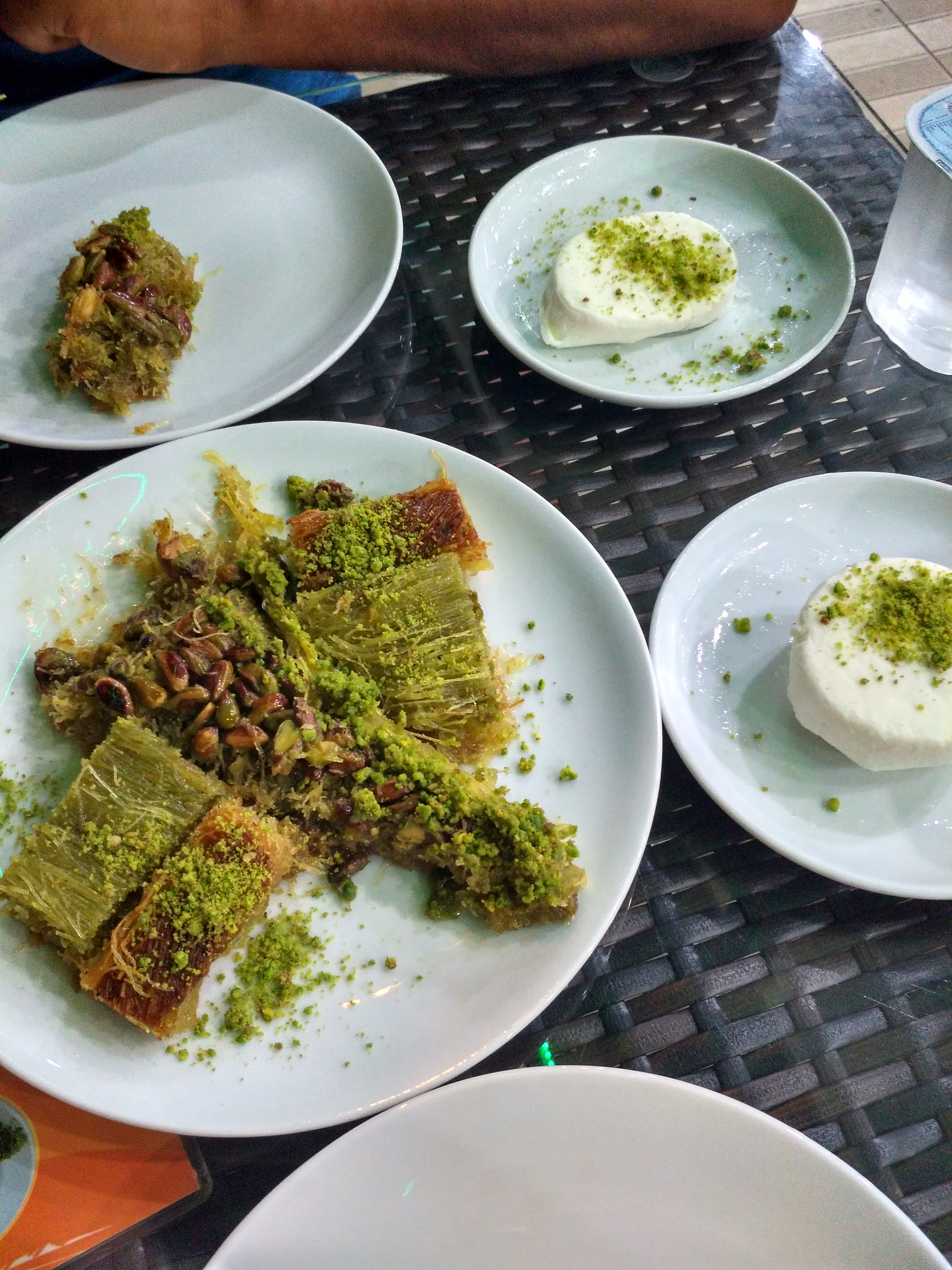
Turkish desserts served with ice cream

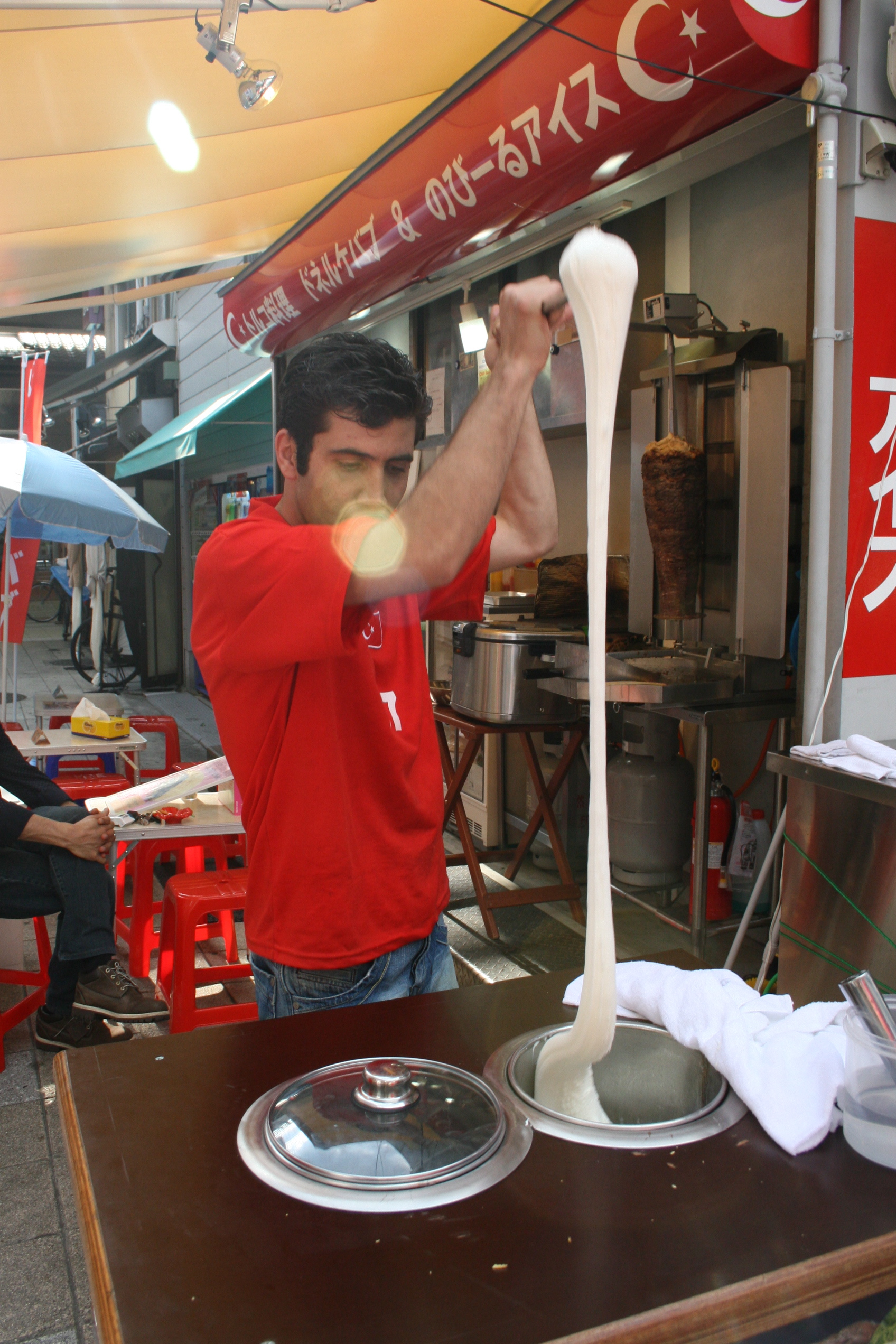
Preparation of Maraş dondurma in a Turkish shop in Kyoto.

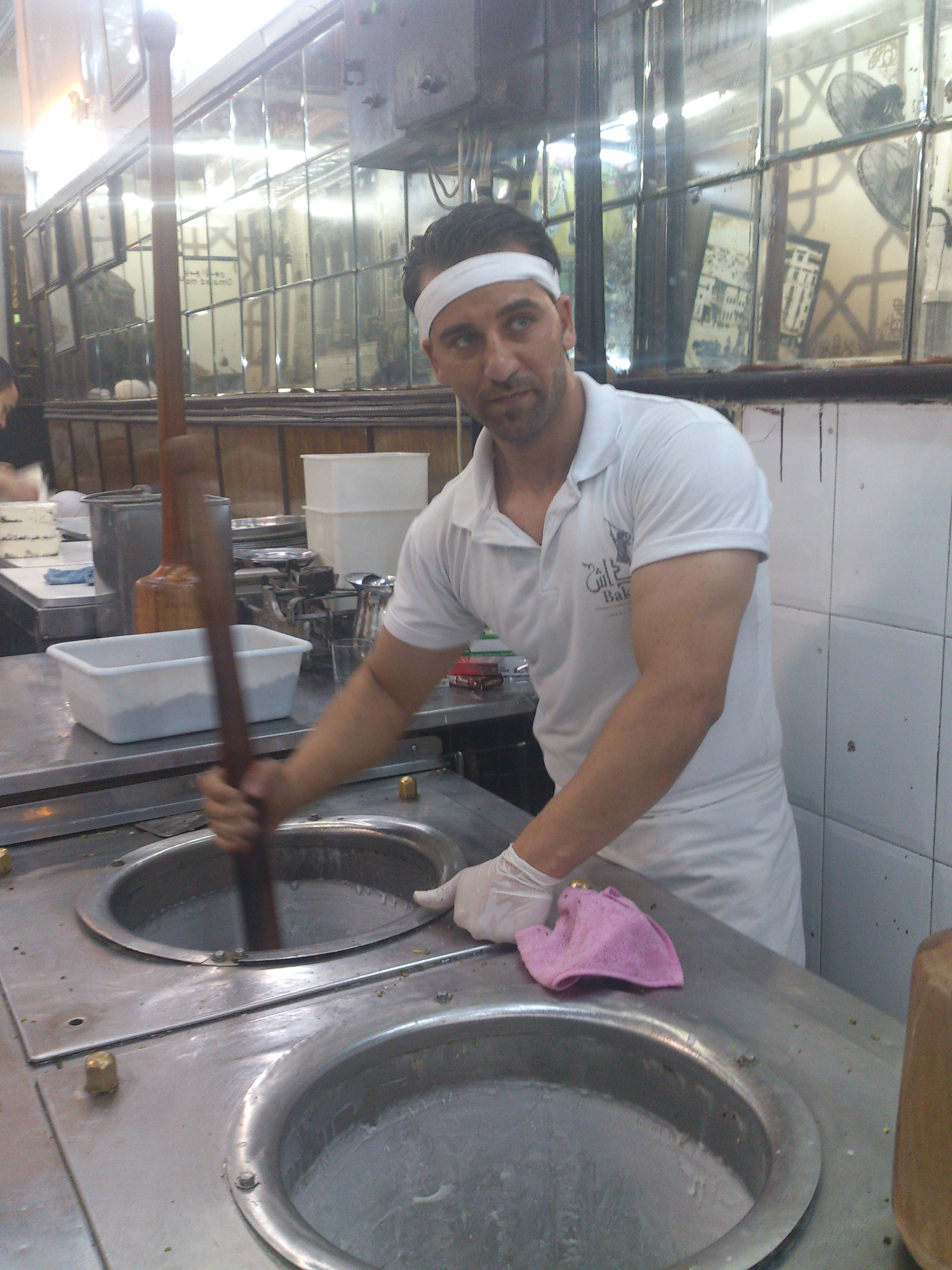
Booza being prepared in Damascus, Syria, by slamming it with a wooden stick, 2013.

== See also ==
- Kaymak
- Booza
- Kulfi
- List of dairy products
