= Salep =

Flour made from orchid tubers

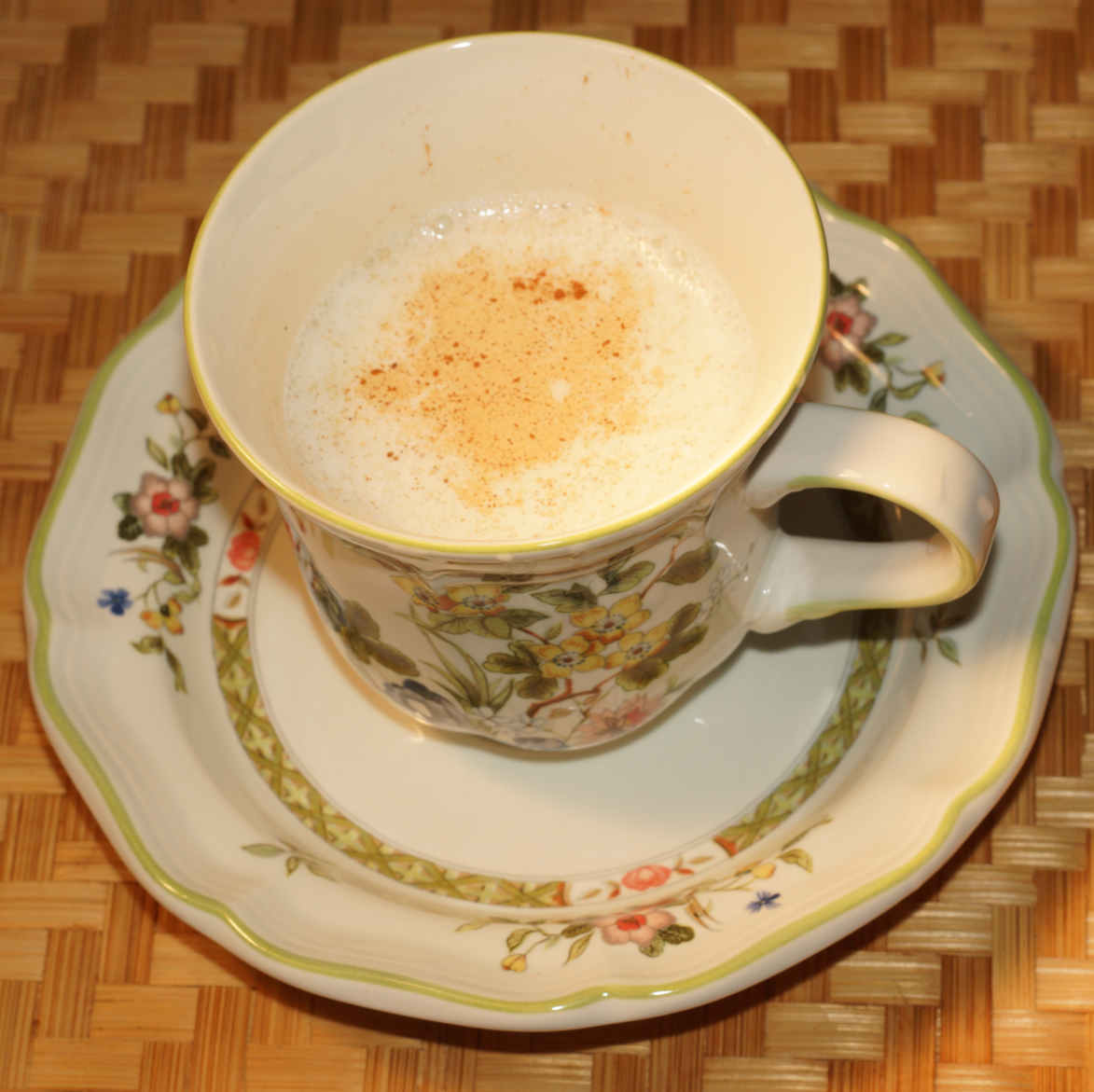
- Salep drink

Salep, also spelled sahlep, salepi or sahlab, (Note: Turkish: salep, sahlep; Persian: ثعلب, romanized: sa'alab; Arabic: سحلب, romanized: saḥlab; Armenian: սալեպ, romanized: salep; Albanian: salep; Azerbaijani: səhləb; Hebrew: סַחְלָבּ, romanized: saḥlab; Greek: σαλέπι, romanized: salepi; Ladino: salep; Tunisian Arabic: سحلب, romanized: soḥlob; Serbo-Croatian: салеп, romanized: salep; Bulgarian: салеп, romanized: salep) is a flour made from the tubers of the orchid genus Orchis (including species Orchis mascula and Orchis militaris). These tubers contain a starchy polysaccharide called glucomannan, giving emulsifying and thickening properties to the product. Salep flour is consumed in beverages and desserts, especially in the cuisines of the former Byzantine and Ottoman Empires, notably in the Levant where it is a traditional winter beverage. An increase in consumption is causing local extinctions of orchids in parts of Greece, Turkey, and Iran.

== Etymology ==
The word salep ultimately comes from Arabic saḥlab (سَحْلَب), and Greek salepi σαλέπι through French and Turkish salep in the mid 18th century. The Arabic word is perhaps shortened from ḵuṣā aṯ-ṯaʕlab (Arabic: خُصَى الثَعْلَب, lit. 'fox's testicles'). The spellings صحلب and سحلب found in modern Arabic dictionaries are borrowed from Turkish.

== History ==
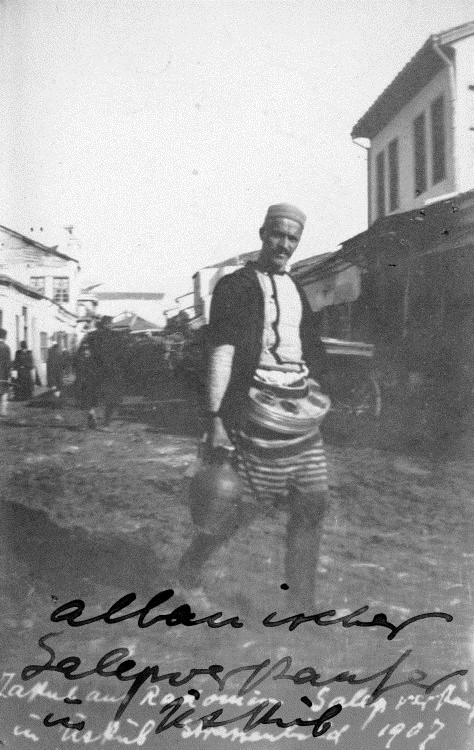
Albanian salep merchant in Ottoman Üsküp (modern Skopje), 1907

The Ancient Romans and Ancient Greeks used ground orchid bulbs to make drinks, which they called by a number of names, especially satyrion and priapiscus. As the names indicate, they considered it to be a powerful aphrodisiac. Of salep, Paracelsus wrote, "behold the Satyrion root, is it not formed like the male privy parts? No one can deny this. Accordingly, magic discovered it and revealed that it can restore a man's virility and passion".

Salep was a popular beverage in the lands of the Ottoman Empire. It enjoyed a reputation as a "fattener" for young women, to make them plumper before marriage. Its consumption spread to England and Germany before the rise of coffee and tea, and it was later offered as an alternative beverage in coffee houses. In England, the drink was known as saloop. Popular in the 17th and 18th centuries in England, its preparation required that the salep powder be added to water until thickened whereupon it would be sweetened, then flavored with orange flower or rose water. Substitution of British orchid roots, known as "dogstones", for the original Turkish variants was acceptable in the 18th century.

=== Saloop ===
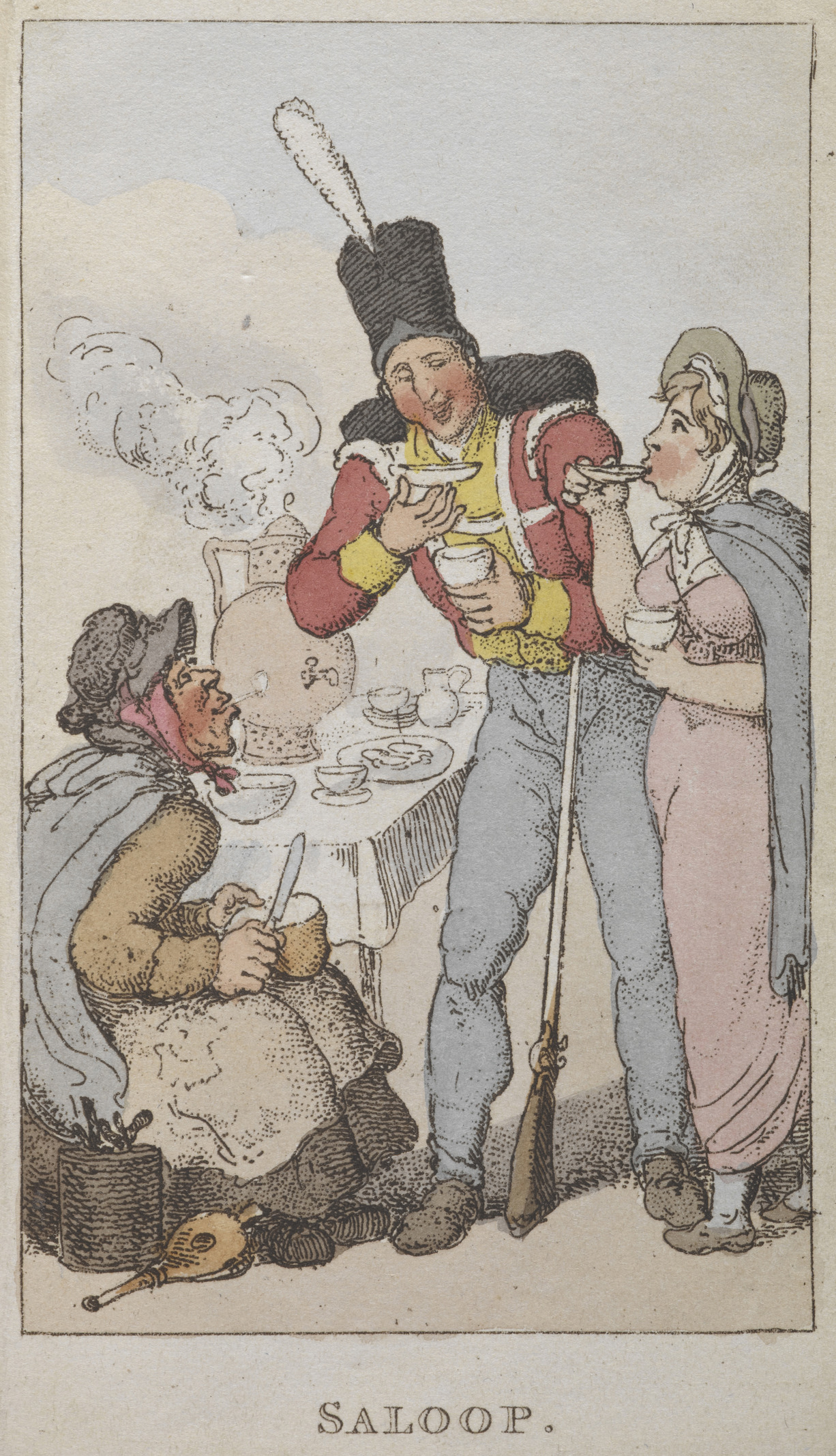
An 1820 sketch by Rowlandson showing members of the lower orders enjoying saloop, which they are drinking from the saucer

Saloop (also known as salop) was a hot drink that was popular in England in the 18th and 19th centuries. Initially, it was made from salep, mostly from Smyrna. Later, the roots and leaves of the North American sassafras tree were the key ingredient. This plant thickened the drink and also had a stimulating quality.

This beverage was sold in place of tea and coffee, which were much more expensive, and was served in a similar way with milk and sugar.

It was used as a remedy for various ailments, including "chronic alcoholic inebriety" and scurvy. Its popularity declined when it was purported to treat venereal disease and so drinking it in public became shameful. Saloop stalls in London were replaced by coffee stalls.

== Modern use ==
The beverage sahlab is now often made with hot milk instead of water. Other desserts are also made from salep flour, including salep pudding and dondurma. The Kahramanmaraş region of Turkey is a major producer of sahlab known as maraş salebi. The popularity of sahlab in Turkey has led to a decline in populations of wild orchids, and it was made illegal to export true salep. Consequently, many instant sahlab mixes are made with artificial flavoring. Salep is also drunk in Albania and Greece; it is usually sold on the streets as a hot beverage during the cold months of the year.

It is estimated that each year in Turkey, 30 tons of tubers from 38 species are harvested; it takes from 1,000 to 4,000 tubers to make a kilogram of flour. With the increasing rarity of some species and local extinctions, traders are harvesting wild orchids in Iran. Abdolbaset Ghorbani of Uppsala University estimates that between 7 and 11 million orchids of 19 species and sub-species were collected from northern Iran in 2013, with the majority exported to Turkey. Harvesting of orchid tubers is also increasing in Greece.

In the Middle East, sahlab is a hot milk-based winter drink with a creamy consistency, topped with cinnamon and sold as street food or made at home. Due to scarcity of orchid flour, it is usually made with a substitute starch such as corn starch or rice flour, and flavored with vanilla. In summer, the same mixture may be cooled and garnished with nuts to make a form of muhallebi. Sahleb is also a core ingredient of booza ice cream.
