= Booza =

Syrian frozen dairy dessert

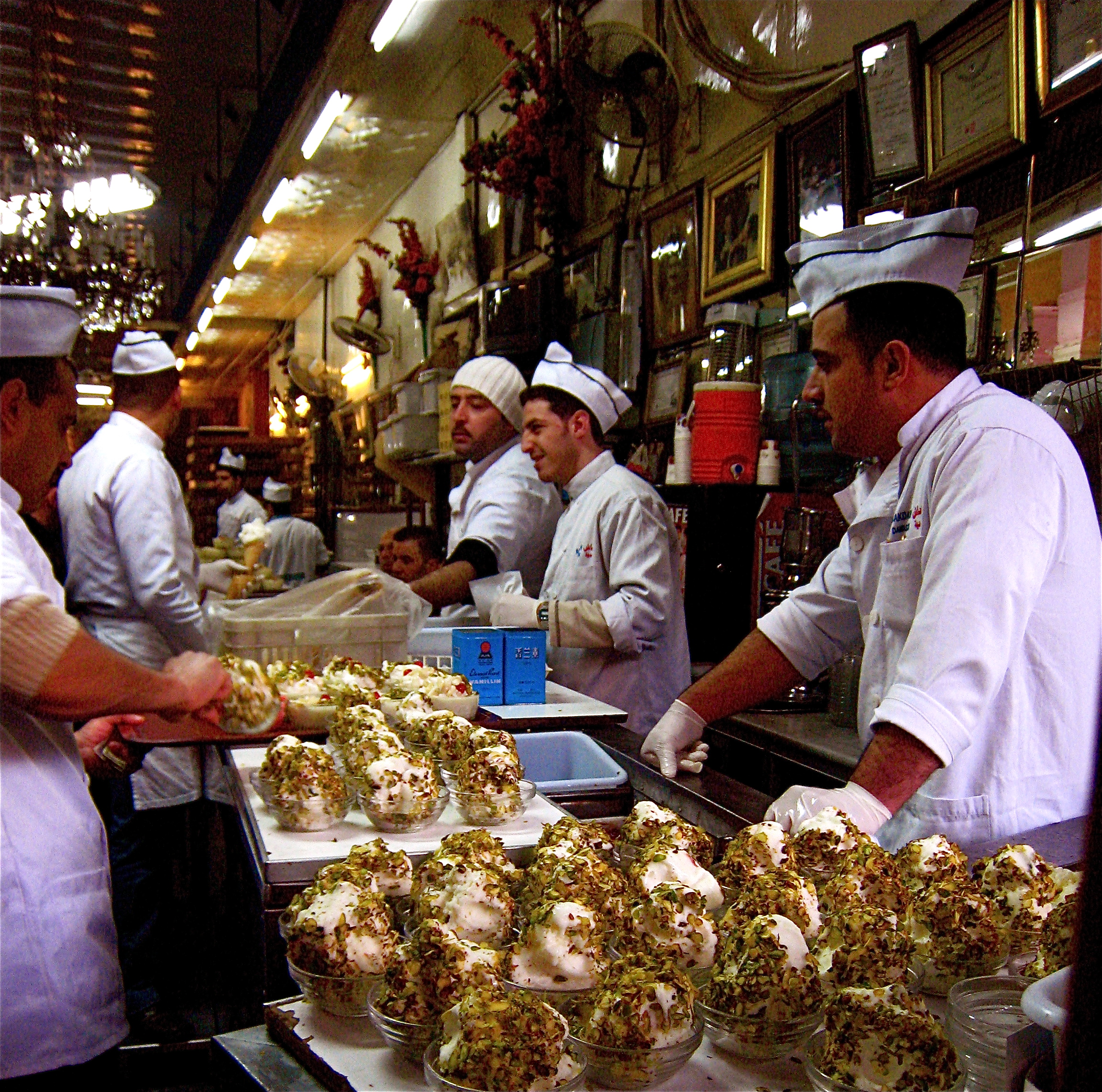
- Booza being sold in the landmark Bakdash ice cream shop in the Al-Hamidiyah Souq in the Old City of Damascus (2009)
- Type: Ice cream
- Serving temperature: Cold
- Main ingredients: Sahlab, mastic
- Ingredients generally used: qishta

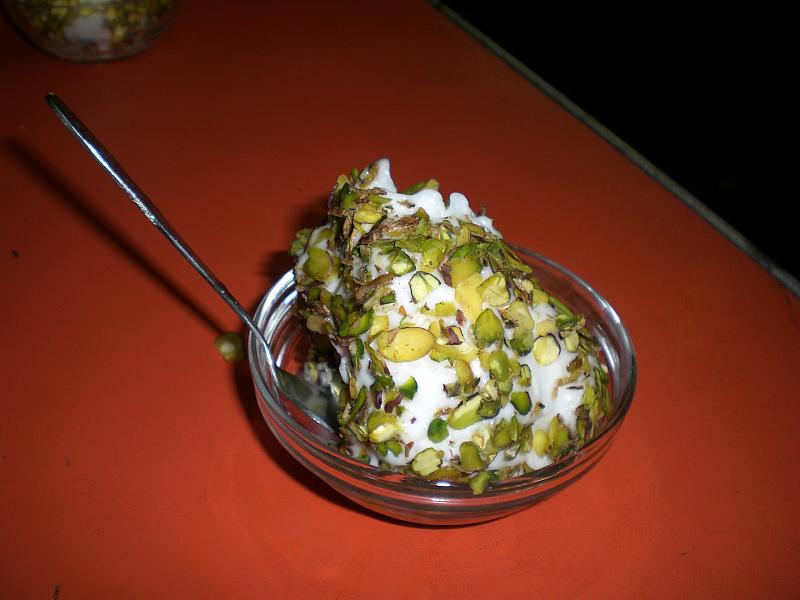
A dish of booza topped with pistachios served at the Bakdash ice cream shop in Damascus

Booza (Arabic: بُوظَة, romanized: Būẓah, lit. 'ice cream') is a frozen dairy dessert. It is traditionally made through a process of pounding and stretching in a freezer drum, instead of the more usual churning method used in other ice creams, leading to a creamy yet dense texture. Orange flower water or rose water are sometimes added for flavoring. The firmness of booza allows it to be shaped into a roll, which is a popular traditional serving method.

== History ==
Booza has a documented history in the Levant. A 2023 article published by the London Museum discusses the history of Syrian booza and its association with Damascus. Booza has been made in Damascus since at least the late 19th century, with a 2022 report on the history of the Bakdash ice cream business documenting its presence in the city by 1895.

== Geographic scope ==
Mastic flavored salep-based booza is made in Jordan. It is also made in Ramallah, in the West Bank by different brands, having spread there from Damascus.

=== Damascus ===
In Al-Hamidiyah Souq in the Old City of Damascus, there is an ice cream store named Bakdash that is known throughout the Arab world for its stretchy and chewy ice cream. It is a popular attraction for tourists as well.

=== International usage ===
The first packaged take-home version of booza in Australia was created in 2011. Booza vendors can be found outside the Levant region in areas like the Bay Area and Williamsburg, Brooklyn in the US, and Sydney, Australia.

== See also ==
- List of dairy products
- List of ice cream varieties by country
