= Al-Hamidiyah Souq =

Oldest bazaar in Damascus, Syria

Al-Hamidiyeh Souq
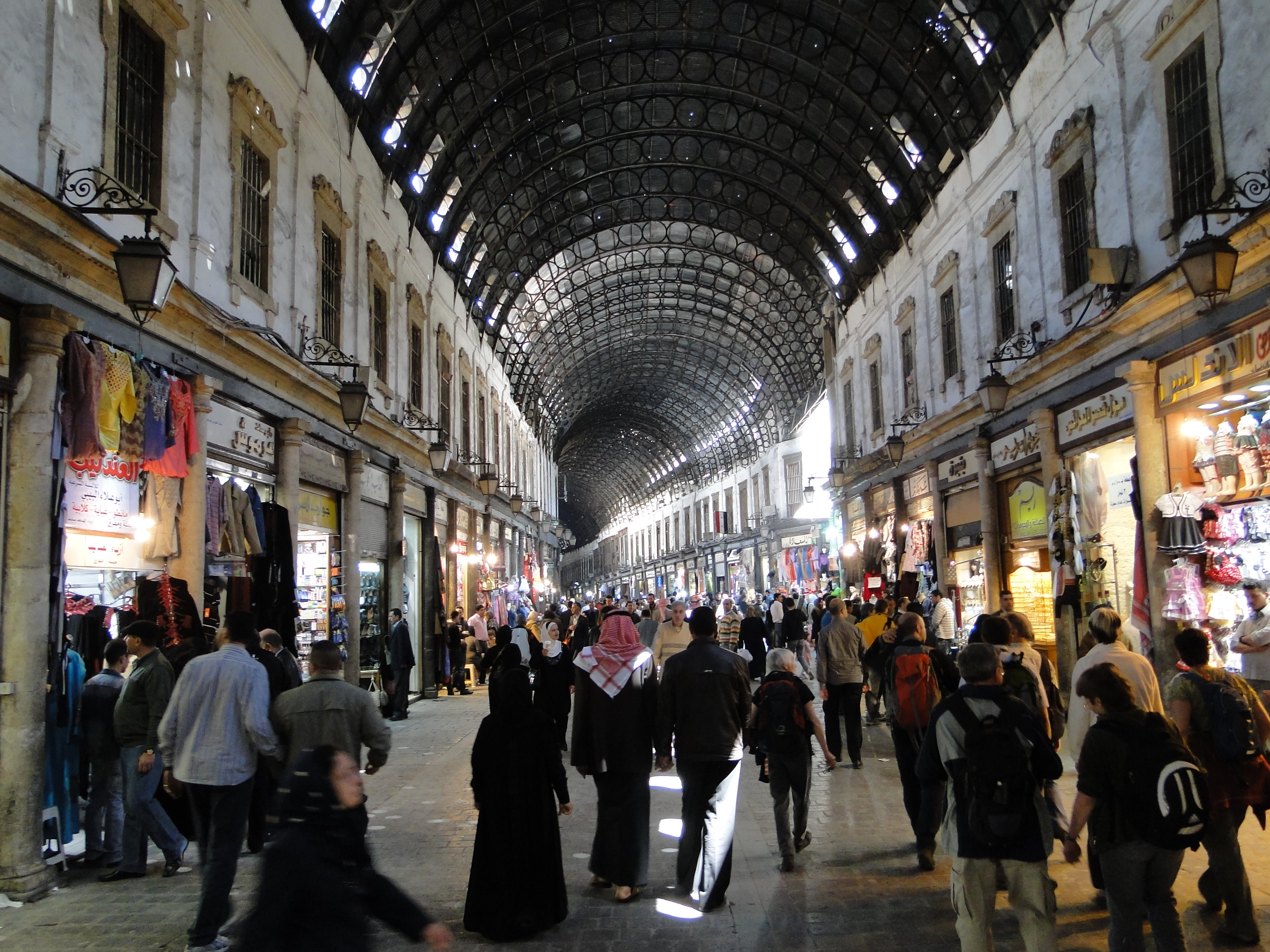
- Interactive map of Al-Hamidiyeh Souq
- Native name: سُوق ٱلْحَمِيدِيَّة (Arabic)
- Length: 600 metres (2,000 ft)
- Width: 15 metres (49 ft)
- Location: Damascus, Syria
- Coordinates: 33°30′39″N 36°18′3″E

Construction
- Construction start: 1780
- Completed: 1884

The Al-Hamidiyeh Souq (Arabic: سُوق ٱلْحَمِيدِيَّة, romanized: Sūq al-Ḥamīdiyyah) is the largest and the central souk in Syria, located inside the old walled city of Damascus next to the Citadel. The souq is about 600 metres (2,000 ft) long and 15 metres (49 ft) wide, and is covered by a 10-metre (33 ft) tall metal arch. The souq starts at Al-Thawra street and ends at the Umayyad Mosque plaza, and the ancient Roman Temple of Jupiter stands 40 feet tall in its entrance.

== History ==
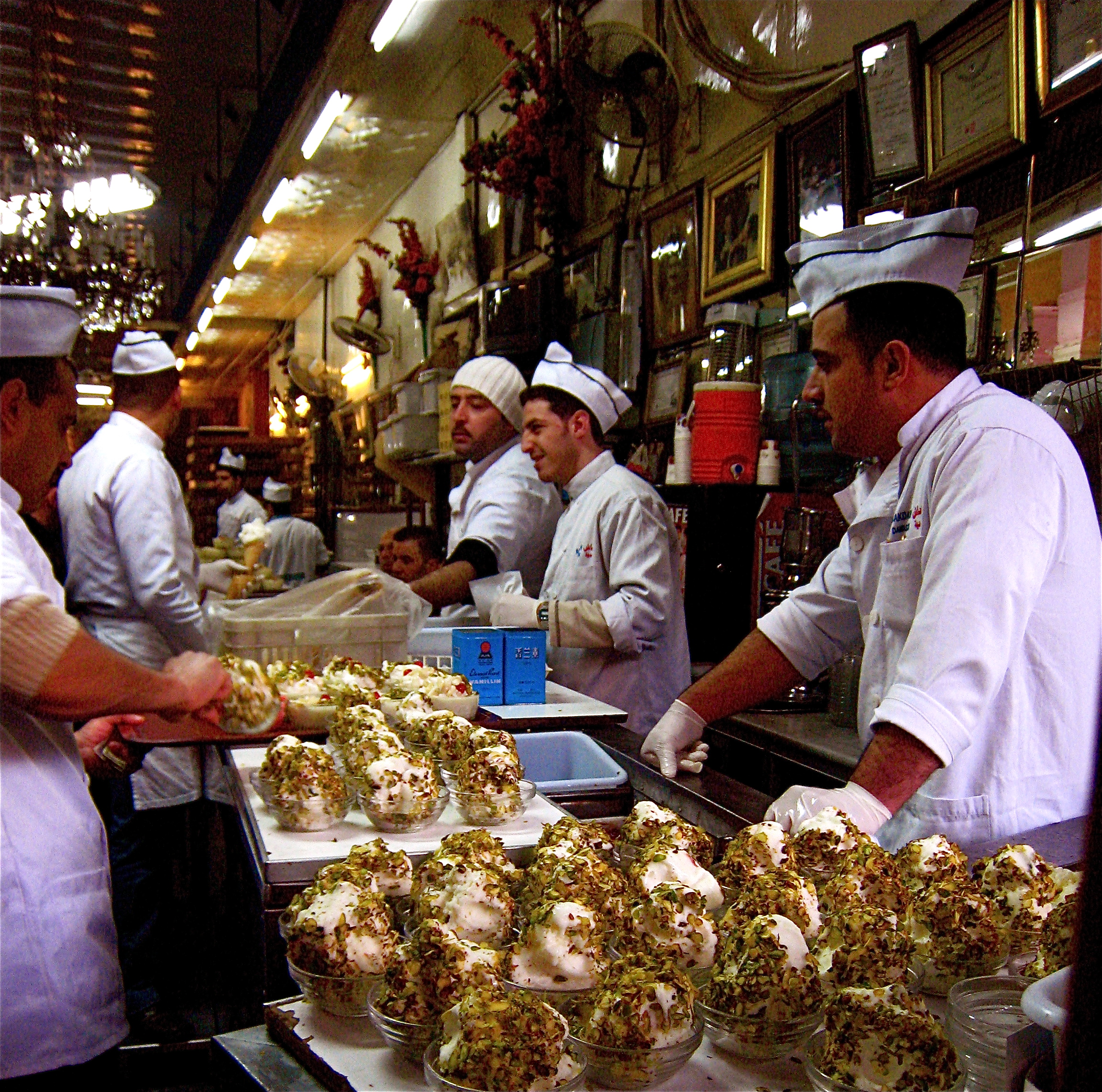
Syrian Booza at Bakdash

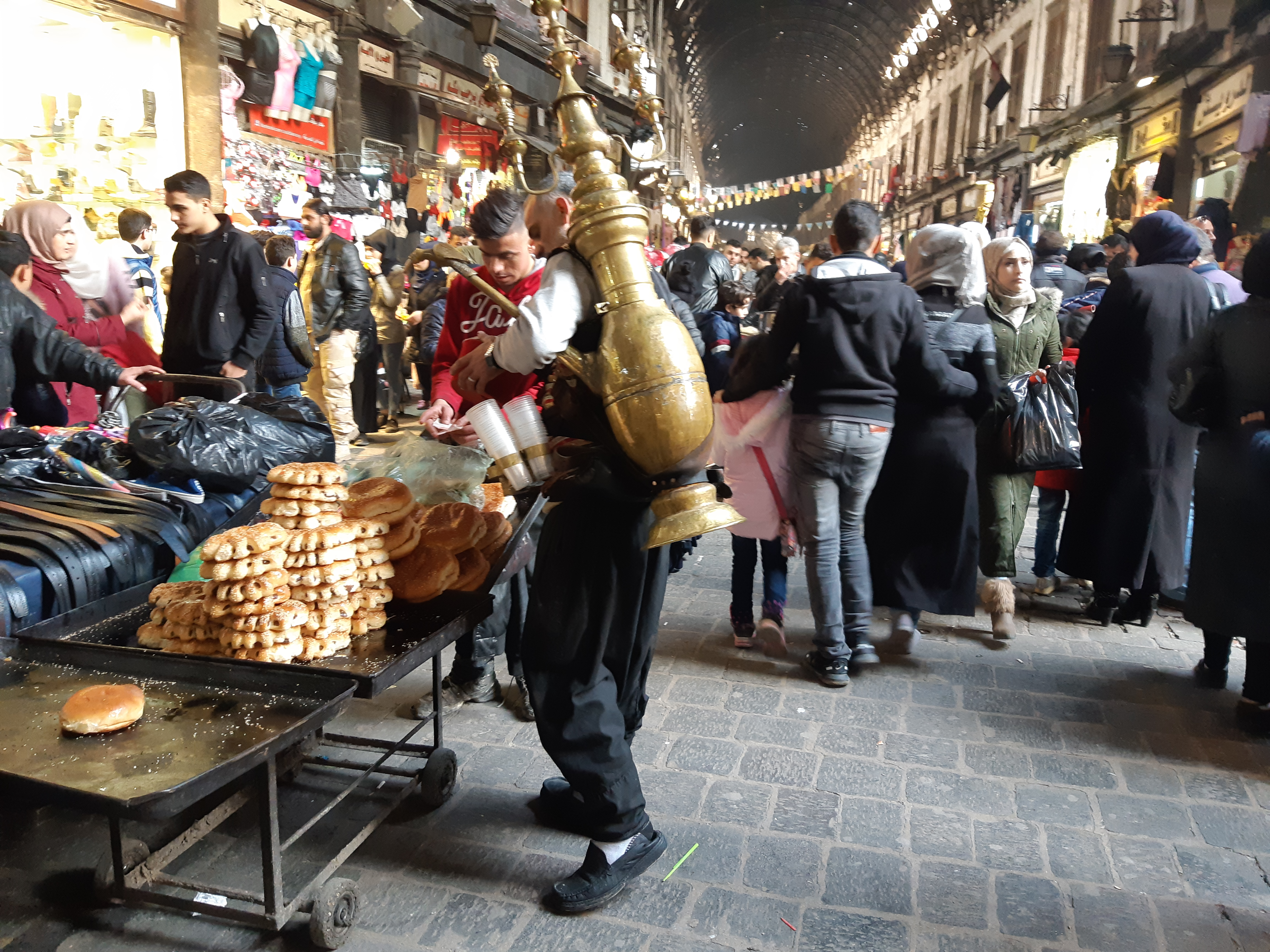
In Al-Hamidiyah Souq

The souq dates back to the Ottoman era and was built along the axis of the Roman route to the Temple of Jupiter around 1780 during the reign of Sultan Abdul Hamid I, and later extended during the reign of Sultan Abdul Hamid II.

In the 1898 book "Palestine and Syria: Handbook for Travellers" by Orientalists Albert Socin and Immanuel Benzinger the souk was described as a "new bazaar" and "handsomely decorated." They noted several Arab confectioners selling "ices, which [were] very popular."

=== 21st century ===
Nowadays it is one of the most popular shopping districts in Syria, being lined with hundreds of clothes emporiums, shops selling traditional crafts and jewelry, cafés, grocery stores, food stalls, and ice cream parlors. Before the Syrian Civil War, it was one of Damascus's main attractions and was visited by many tourists, including Europeans and Gulf Arabs; however, it still remains a popular attraction for locals and Syrians.

Although there have been many violent clashes around Damascus and in some of its districts, the souq has not been affected in any way by the Syrian Civil War. Peaceful protests and demonstrations have taken place in the nearby Medhat Pasha Souq, which extends from the Al Hamidiyah Souq.

It was one of the treasures featured in the 2005 BBC documentary Around the World in 80 Treasures presented by Dan Cruickshank.

== See also ==
- Al-Buzuriyah Souq
- Medhat Pasha Souq
- Al-Madina Souq of Aleppo
