= Bakdash (ice cream parlor) =

Ice cream parlor in Damascus, Syria

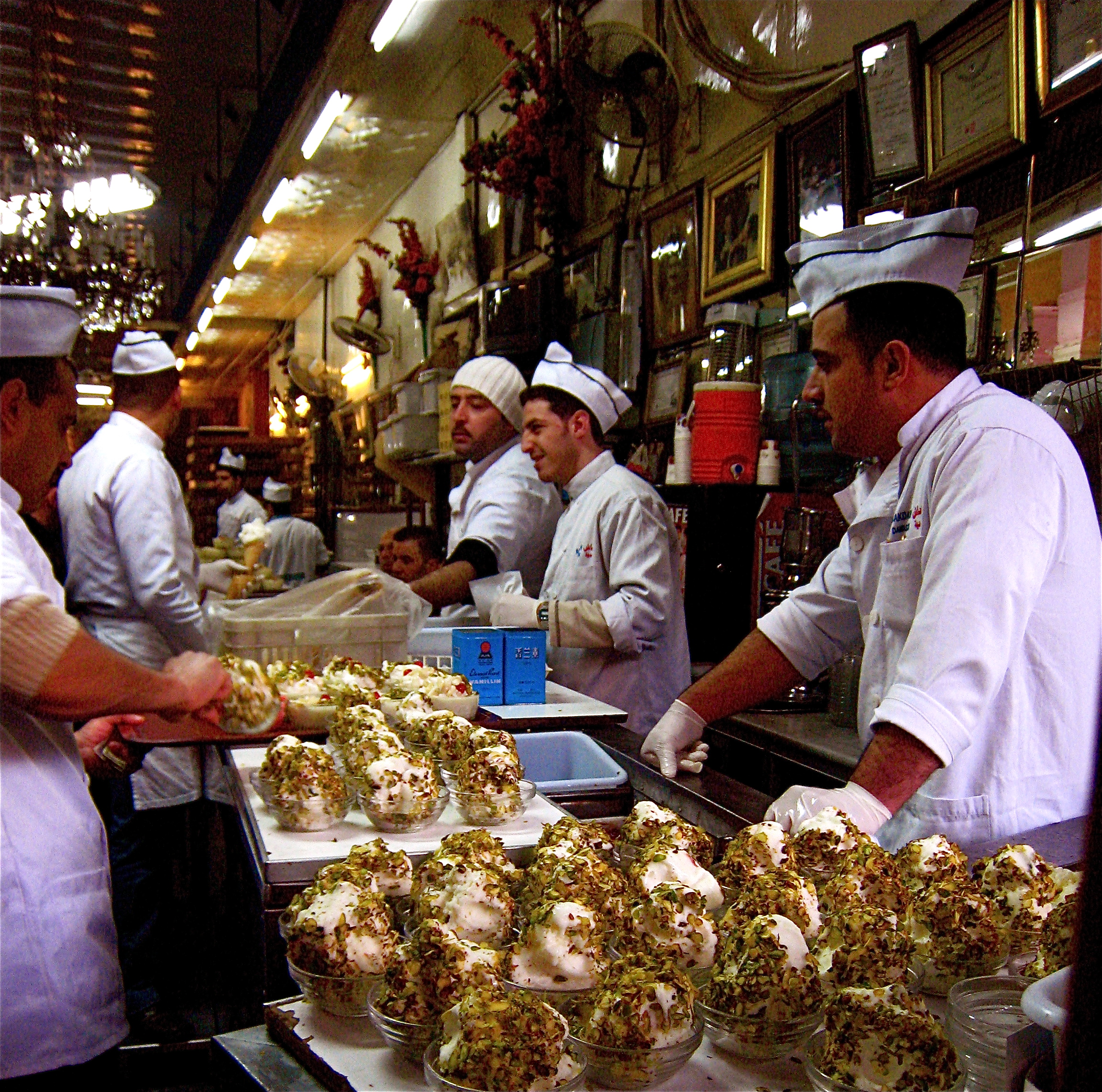
- Bakdash in 2009

Restaurant information
- Established: 1895
- Food type: Ice cream (booza)
- Location: Damascus, Syria
- Other locations: Amman, Jordan

Bakdash (Arabic: بَكْدَاش, romanized: Bakdāš), alternatively romanized as Bakdach, is a landmark ice cream parlor in the Al-Hamidiyah Souq in the old city of Damascus. Established in 1885, it is famous for its traditional Middle Eastern booza—a mastic frozen dairy dessert. It is renowned around the Arab world and has become a popular tourist attraction.

Following the outbreak of the Syrian war in 2011, Bakdash opened a branch in neighbouring Jordan.

== See also ==
- Dondurma
