= Hankar House =

Historic Art Nouveau house in Brussels, Belgium

- Maison Hankar (French); Huis Hankar (Dutch)
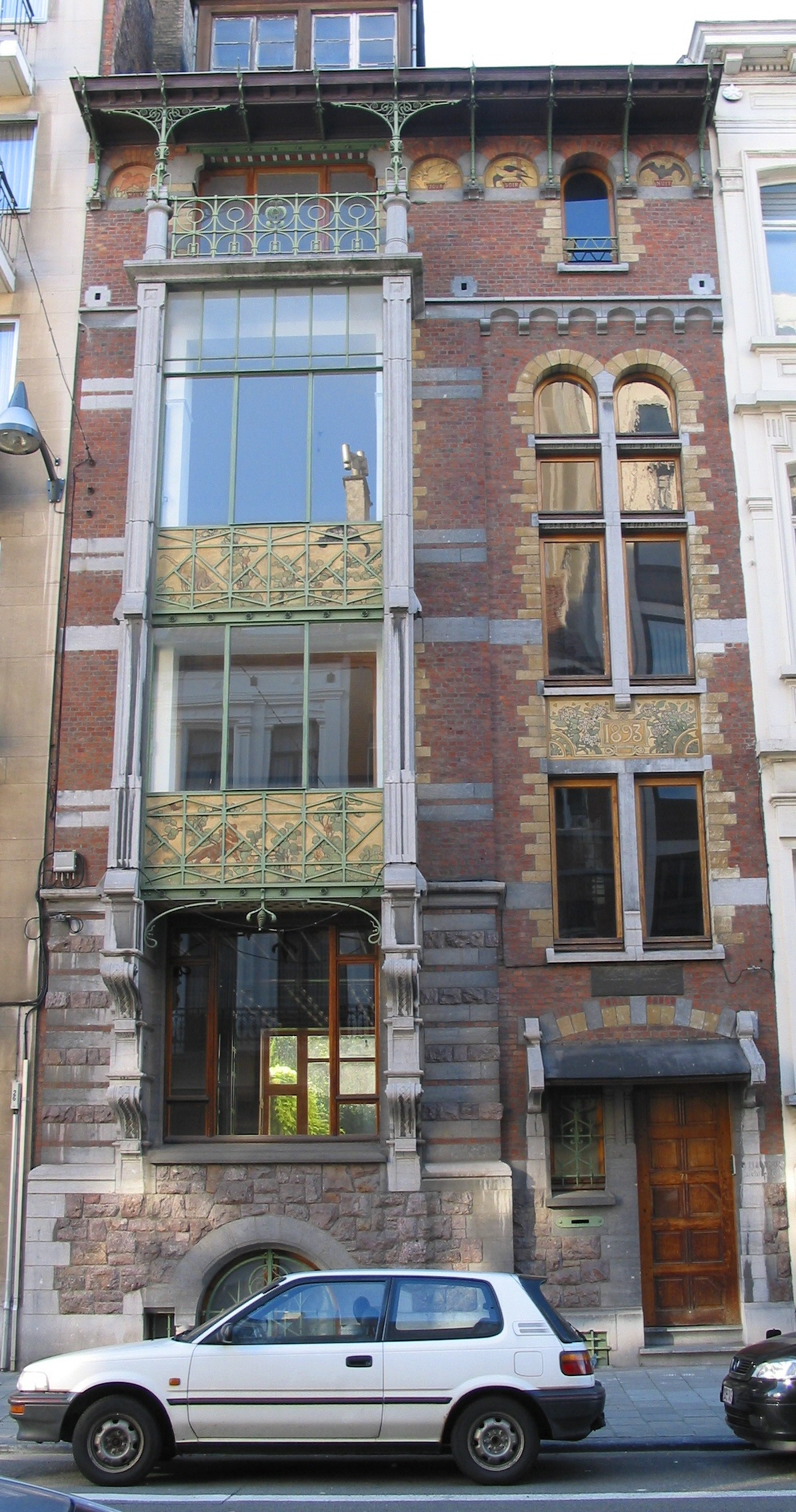
- Main façade of the Hankar House
- Interactive map of the Hankar House area

General information
- Type: Town house
- Architectural style: Art Nouveau
- Location: Rue Defacqz / Defacqzstraat 71, 1060 Saint-Gilles, Brussels-Capital Region, Belgium
- Coordinates: 50°49′38″N 4°21′28″E
- Completed: 1893

Design and construction
- Architect: Paul Hankar

The Hankar House (French: Maison Hankar; Dutch: Huis Hankar or Hankarhuis) is a historic town house in Brussels, Belgium. It was designed by the architect Paul Hankar, and built in 1893, in Art Nouveau style. It is generally considered one of the first buildings in that style (along with the Hôtel Tassel by Victor Horta, built at the same time) because of its highly innovative plan and its ground-breaking use of materials and decoration.

The house is located at 71, rue Defacqz/Defacqzstraat in the municipality of Saint-Gilles, a few steps from the Hôtel Albert Ciamberlani, another Art Nouveau building by Hankar.

== Architecture ==
From 1879 to 1894, Hankar worked in the studio of the architect Henri Beyaert, a master of eclectic and neoclassical architecture. Through Beyaert, Hankar became an admirer of Eugène Viollet-le-Duc, the French architect who advocated the use of innovative new materials such as iron and glass, while drawing from historical architecture for inspiration. In 1893, he designed and built the Hankar House, his own residence, at 71, rue Defacqz/Defacqzstraat, in the Saint-Gilles municipality of Brussels. The town house Hankar built, on a narrow lot in a wealthy Brussels neighborhood near the Avenue Louise/Louizalaan, was very different from the buildings around it. The dominant styles were Beaux-Arts and neoclassical, with symmetrical features such as pediments and pilasters, constructed in brick or stone.

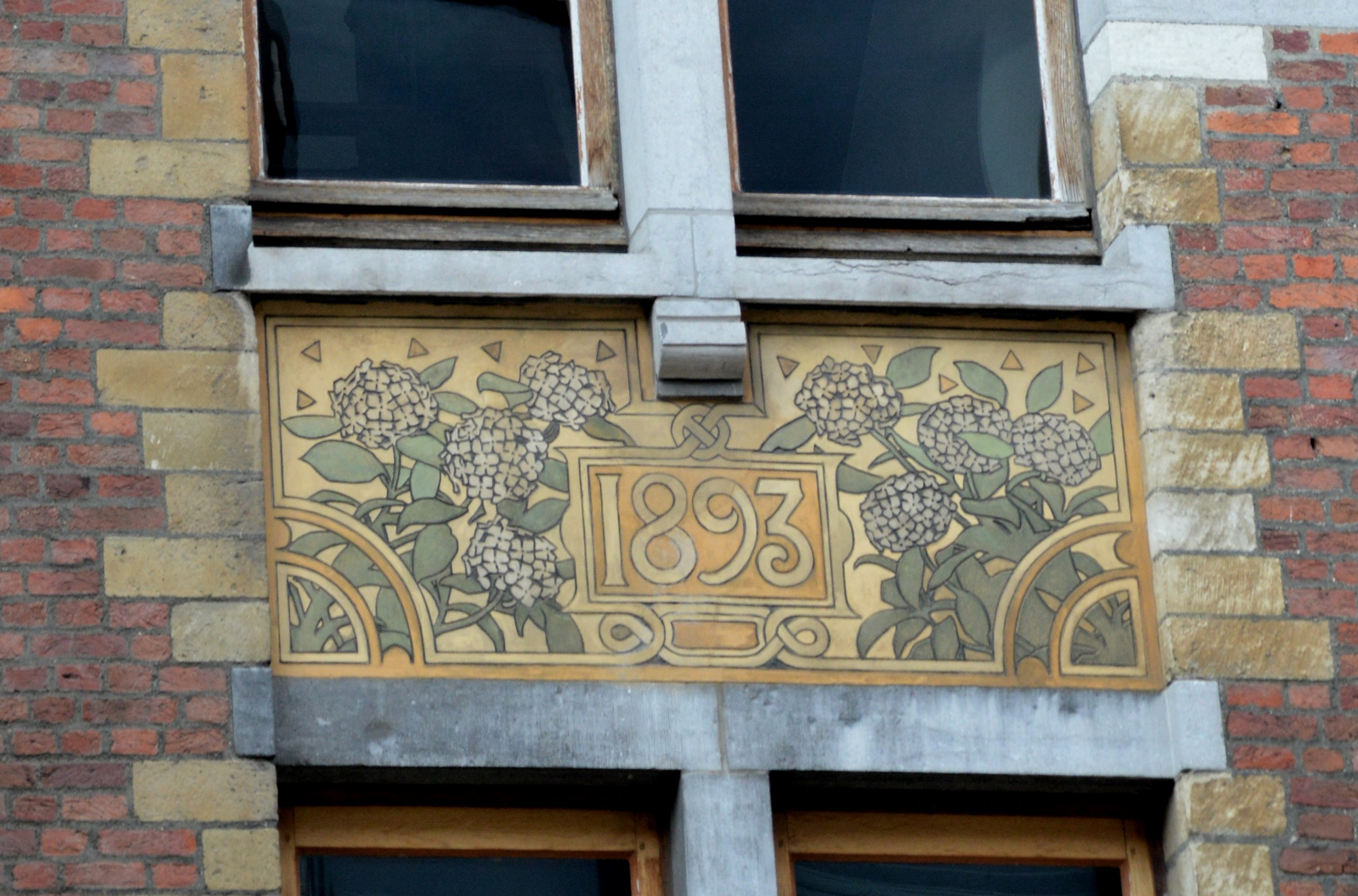
Sgrafitto decoration on the Hankar House's façade

The design of the Hankar House showed the influence of the neo-Renaissance style, but in other ways, deliberately broke away from the traditional historical styles, being inspired by the new ideas of Viollet-le-Duc, John Ruskin and William Morris. The façade, instead of hiding the functions of the interior, expressed them clearly, and asymmetrically. The eastern third, containing the entrance and stairs, is offset a half-story from the western two-thirds, containing the public rooms. A three-story projecting box-bay, supported on stone corbels, provides ample light to the second and third floor rooms and a balcony for the fourth. The bow window on the ground floor indicated the living room, an array of small windows over the entrance indicated the staircase, and the large bay window on the upper floor windows indicated the artist's workshop. He used curving iron columns to support the overhanging roof and stone columns supporting the balconies to give a strong vertical element.

For decorative touches below the windows and the roofline, Hankar brought together the talents of several of his artist friends, including the sculptor René Janssens and the painter Albert Ciamberlani, who adorned the façade with sgraffito, or layers of plaster tinted in pastel colours onto a moistened surface, a technique popular in Renaissance Italy in the 15th and 16th centuries. The façade and balconies feature wrought iron railings with decoration and curling lines in stylised floral patterns, which became an important feature of Art Nouveau. Variety was given to the façade by the use of different shades and colours of brick and stone. Mural panels by Hankar's friend and frequent collaborator, Adolphe Crespin, appear under the windows and in an arcaded frieze at the eaves. The interplay between heavy neo-Renaissance elements and materials versus light Art Nouveau detailing and decoration results in a vivid composition.

Based on this model, he built several houses for his artist friends, including Janssens, Ciamberlani, the designer, silversmith and jeweller Philippe Wolfers, as well as the painter Léon Bartholomé. Interest in the house spread beyond Belgium. The French architect and designer Hector Guimard made a drawing of the façade in 1895.

== See also ==
- Art Nouveau in Brussels
- History of Brussels
- Culture of Belgium
- Belgium in the long nineteenth century
