= Sgraffito =

Art technique involving scratching

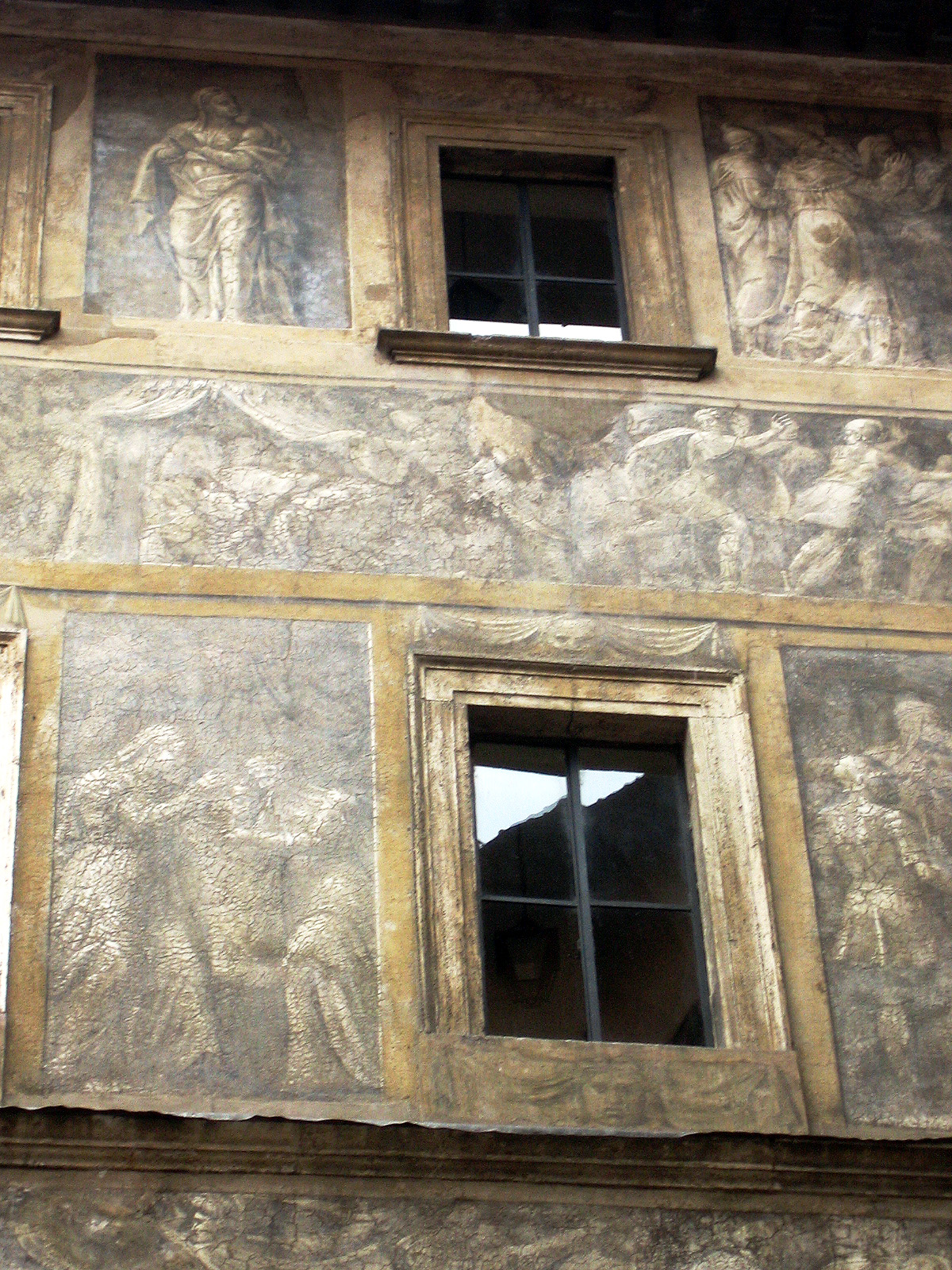
Palazzo Massimo Istoriato: a fading palace facade in Rome by Polidoro da Caravaggio and Maturino da Firenze, 1523

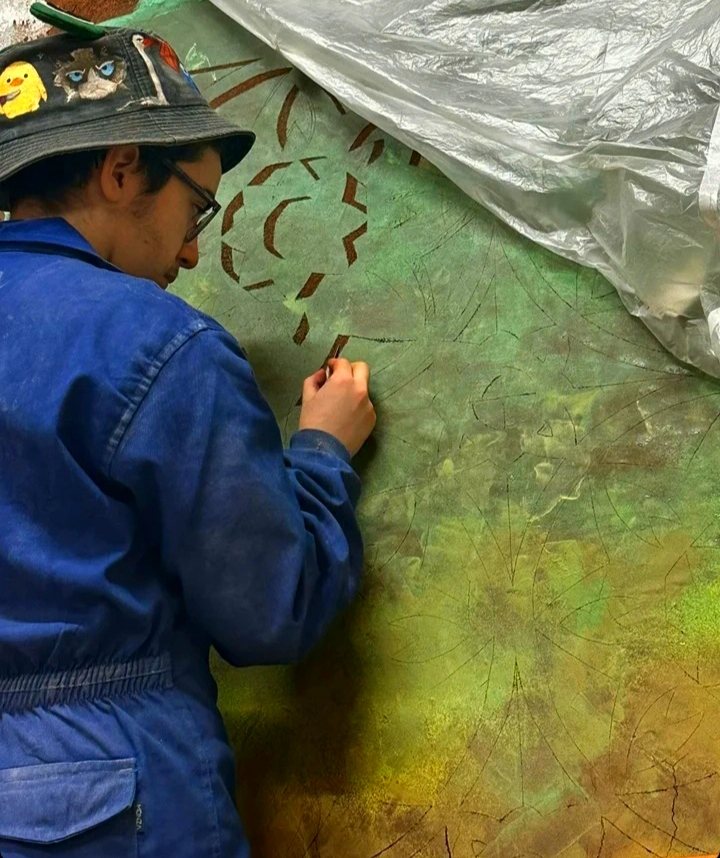
Artist from Pedraza creates a sgraffito mural at the Casa de los Picos School of Art and Design, Segovia

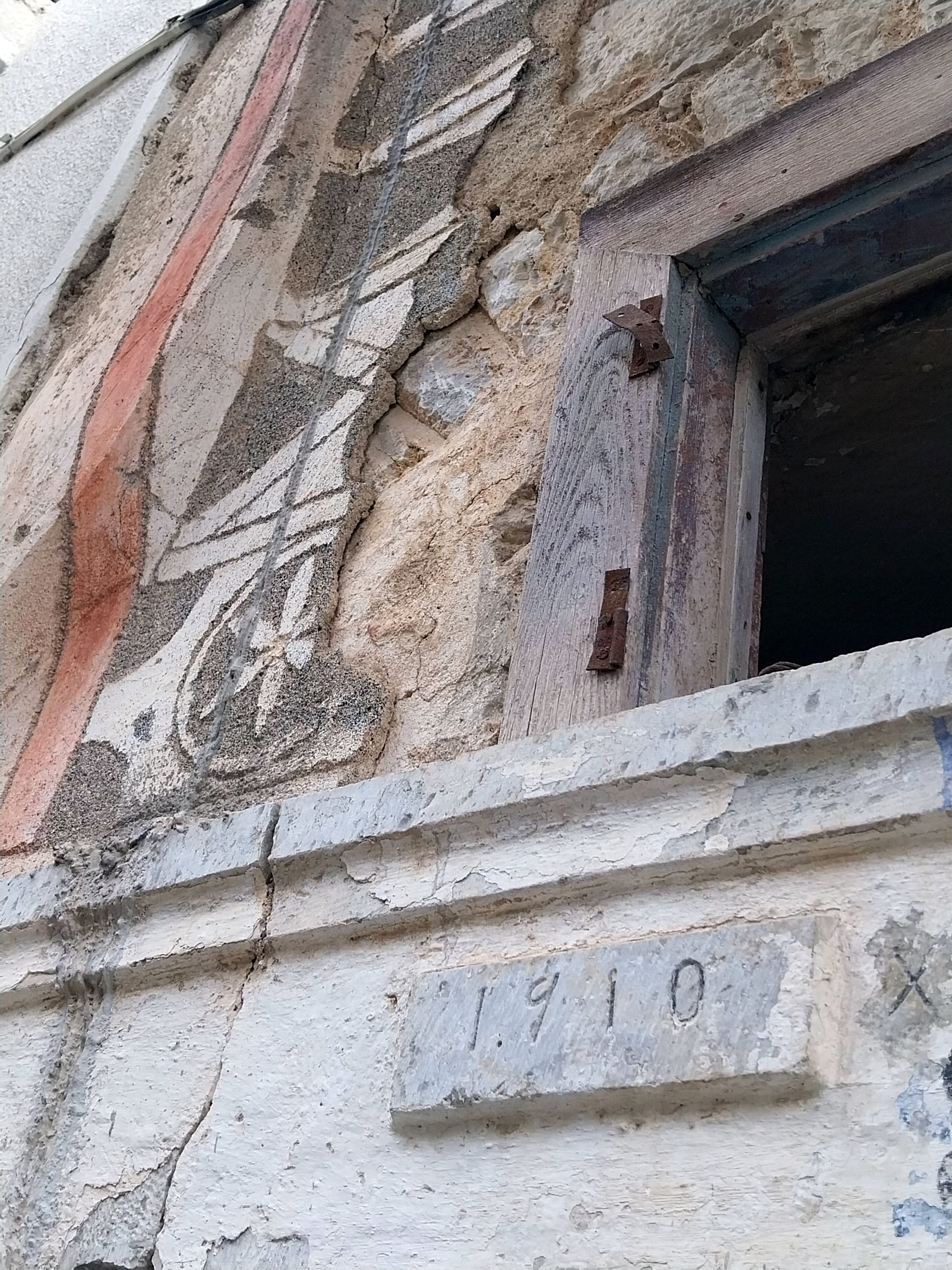
Layers of 1910 Sgraffito in Pirgy (Chios)

Sgraffito (Italian: [zɡrafˈfiːto]; pl. sgraffiti) is an artistic or decorative technique of scratching through a coating on a hard surface to reveal parts of an underlying layer contrasted in colour. It is produced on walls by applying layers of plaster tinted in contrasting colours to a moistened surface, and on pottery by applying two successive layers of contrasting slip or glaze to an unfired ceramic body. The Italian past participle sgraffiato is also used for this technique, especially in reference to pottery.

== Etymology ==
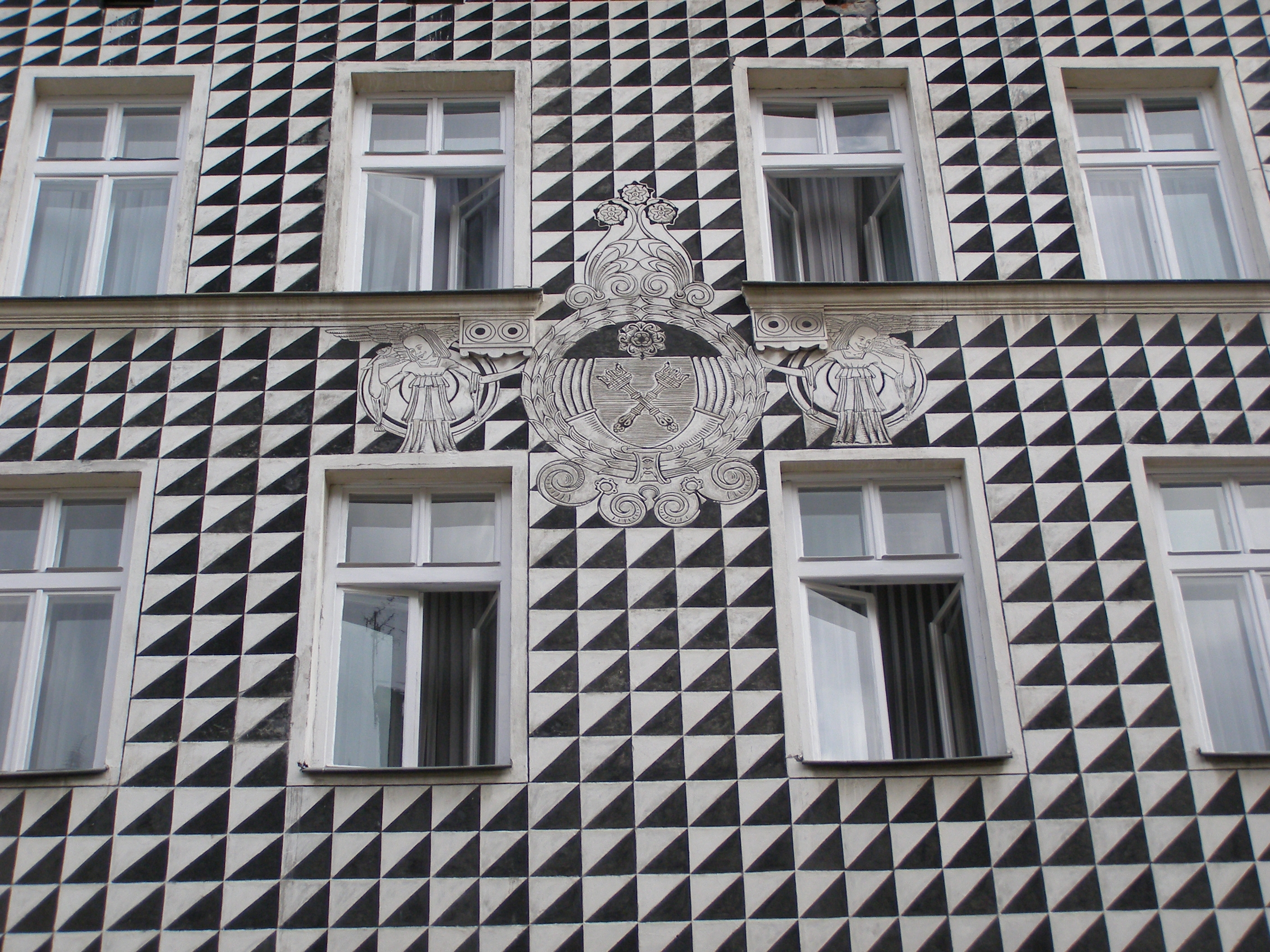
Facade of the Jagiellonian University guesthouse in Kraków

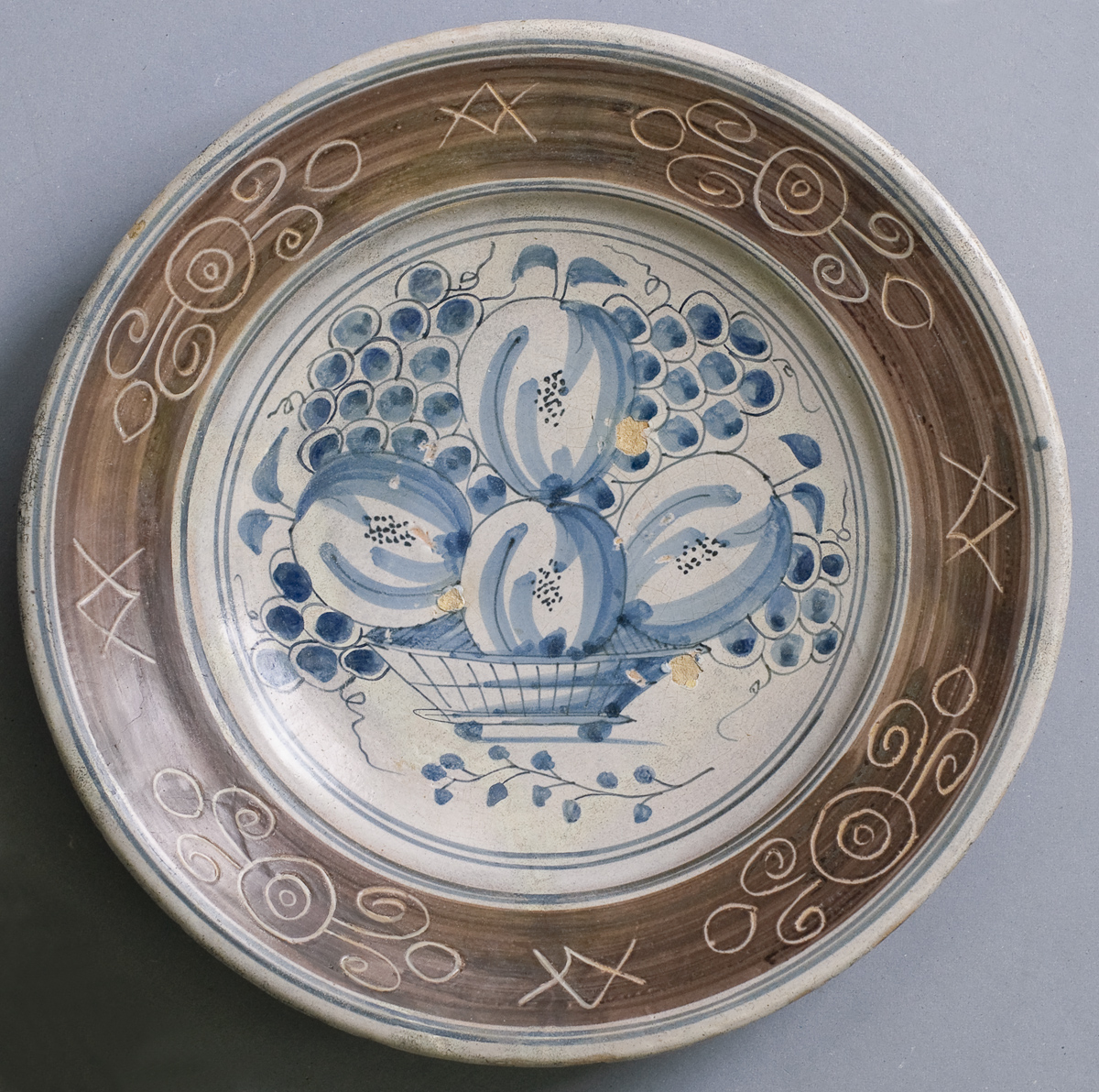
Sgraffito decoration of ceramics, in the brown slip on the rim

The term sgraffito is based on the verb graffiare 'to scratch', which probably entered Italian through Lombardic and ultimately traces back to the Greek word gráphein 'to write'. The Italian prefix 's-' originates in the Latin prefix 'ex-', and is used in this case to intensify the basic meaning, so that 'to scratch' becomes 'to scratch off'.

== History ==
Sgraffito on walls has been used in Europe since classical times. It was popularized in Italy in the 15th and 16th centuries and can be found in African art. In combination with ornamental decoration, these techniques formed an alternative to the prevailing painting of walls. The technical procedure for sgraffito is relatively simple, resembling the process of painting frescoes.

Sgraffito played a significant role during the Italian Renaissance, with two of Raphael's workshops, Polidoro da Caravaggio and his partner Maturino da Firenze, among the leading specialists. They painted palace facades in Rome and other cities; however, most of their work has since weathered. During the 16th century, the technique was brought to Germany by the master builders of the Renaissance and taken up with enthusiasm. As a simple native art, old examples of sgraffito can be found in the wide surroundings of Wetterau and Marburg. In Germany, the technique is most predominant in Bavaria. The use of sgraffito was common in the creation of housing façades for the purposes of advertising. The technique was also used in Thuringia, the Engadin, Austria, and Transylvania.

In Catalonia, sgraffito was implemented in the early 20th century by the Noucentista neo-classical architects and became a recurrent technique in façade decoration.

Another use of sgraffito is seen in its simplified painting technique. One coat of paint is left to dry on a canvas or sheet of paper. Another coat of a different color is painted on top of the first layer. The artist then uses a palette knife or oil stick to scratch out a design, leaving behind an image in the color of the first coat of paint. This can also be achieved by using oil pastels for the first layer and black ink for the top layer. Sometimes a first coat of paint is not needed, and the wet coat scraped back reveals the canvas. This cannot be achieved by using the oil pastel method. This technique is often used in art classes to teach the sgraffito technique to novice art students.

== Art Nouveau ==
Examples of graphic work on facades saw a resurgence c. 1890 through 1915, in the context of the rise of the Arts and Crafts Movement, the Vienna Secession, and particularly the Art Nouveau movement in Belgium and France.

The English artist Heywood Sumner has been identified as this era's pioneer of the technique, for example his work at the 1892 St Mary's Church, Sunbury, Surrey. Sumner's work is sgraffito per se, scratched plaster, but the term has come to encompass a variety of techniques for producing exterior graphic decoration.

Other examples include:

- Ceramic panels on the Grande Maison de Blanc, Brussels, architect Oscar François, artist Henri Privat-Livemont, 1896–1897
- The Hôtel Albert Ciamberlani, Brussels, architect Paul Hankar, sgraffito designs by Albert Ciamberlani and executed by Adolphe Crespin, 1897.
- The Golden House, Charleroi (Belgium), sgraffito designs by Gabriel Van Dievoet 1899.
- Princess of Dreams tile tympanum and other work, Hotel Metropol, Moscow, architect William Walcot, artist Mikhail Vrubel, 1899–1907
- Cauchie House, Brussels, architect Paul Cauchie, 1905
- Ceramic Homage to Prague tympanum of the Municipal House in Prague, architect Osvald Polívka, artist Karel Špillar, 1905–1912

== Modern usage ==
Sgraffito, locally known as xysta, is still practiced in the village of Pyrgi on the island of Chios, Greece. Here, most of the houses and public buildings are covered in rows of fine geometric patterns. Originally, it was designed by the local craftsmen to demonstrate their range of patterns and skills.

== Gallery ==
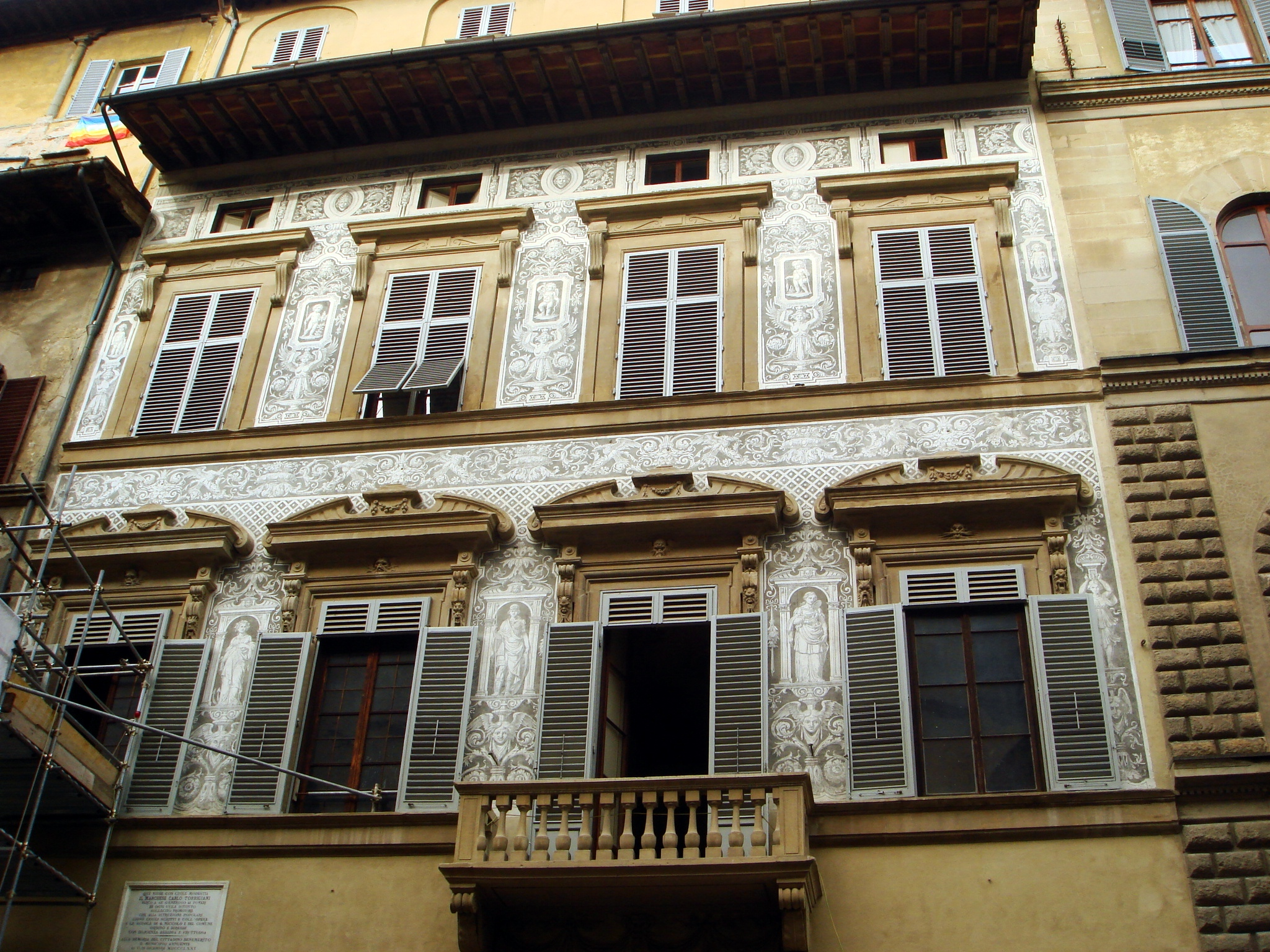
Palazzo Nasi, Florence

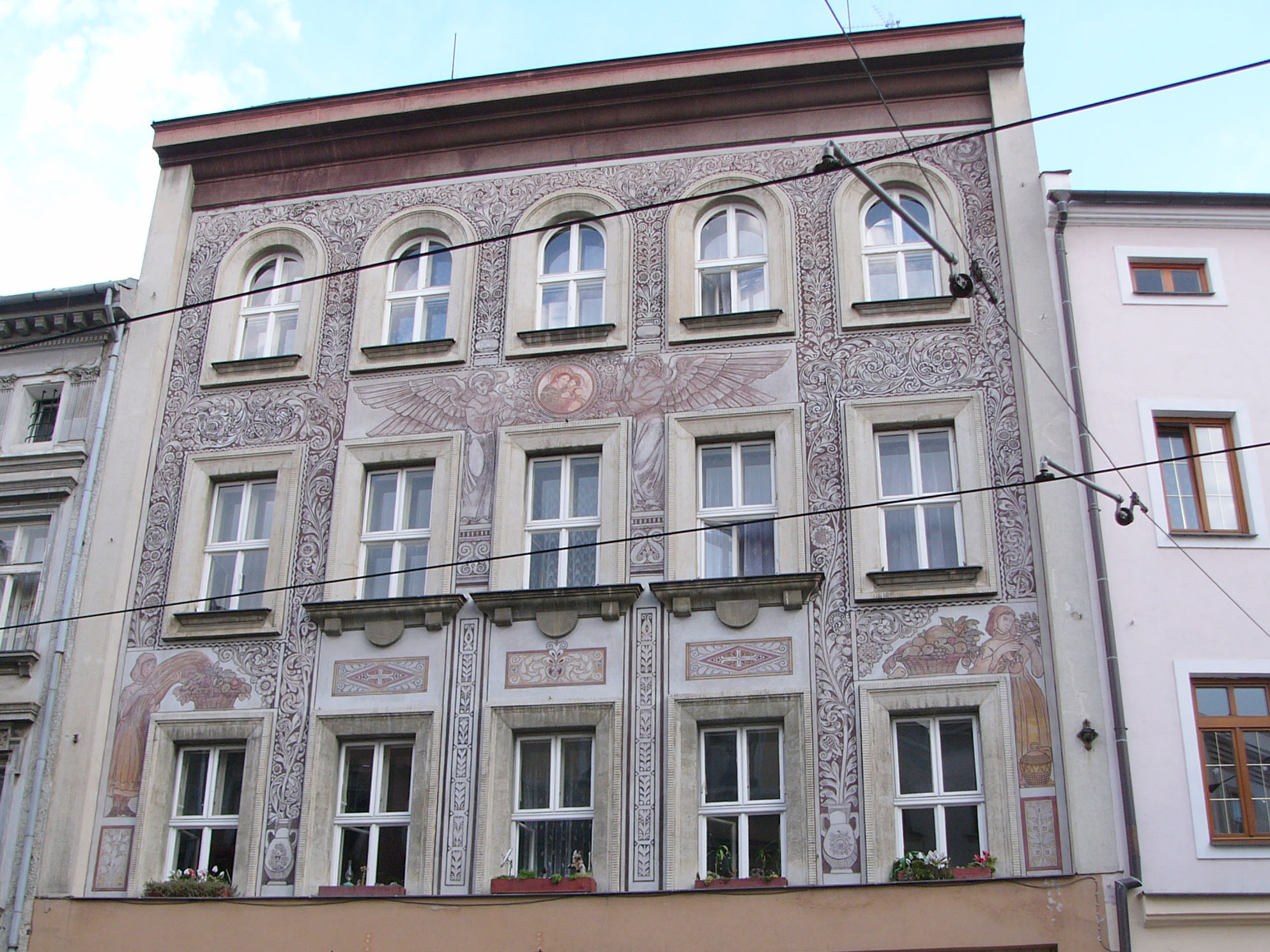
Building in Olomouc

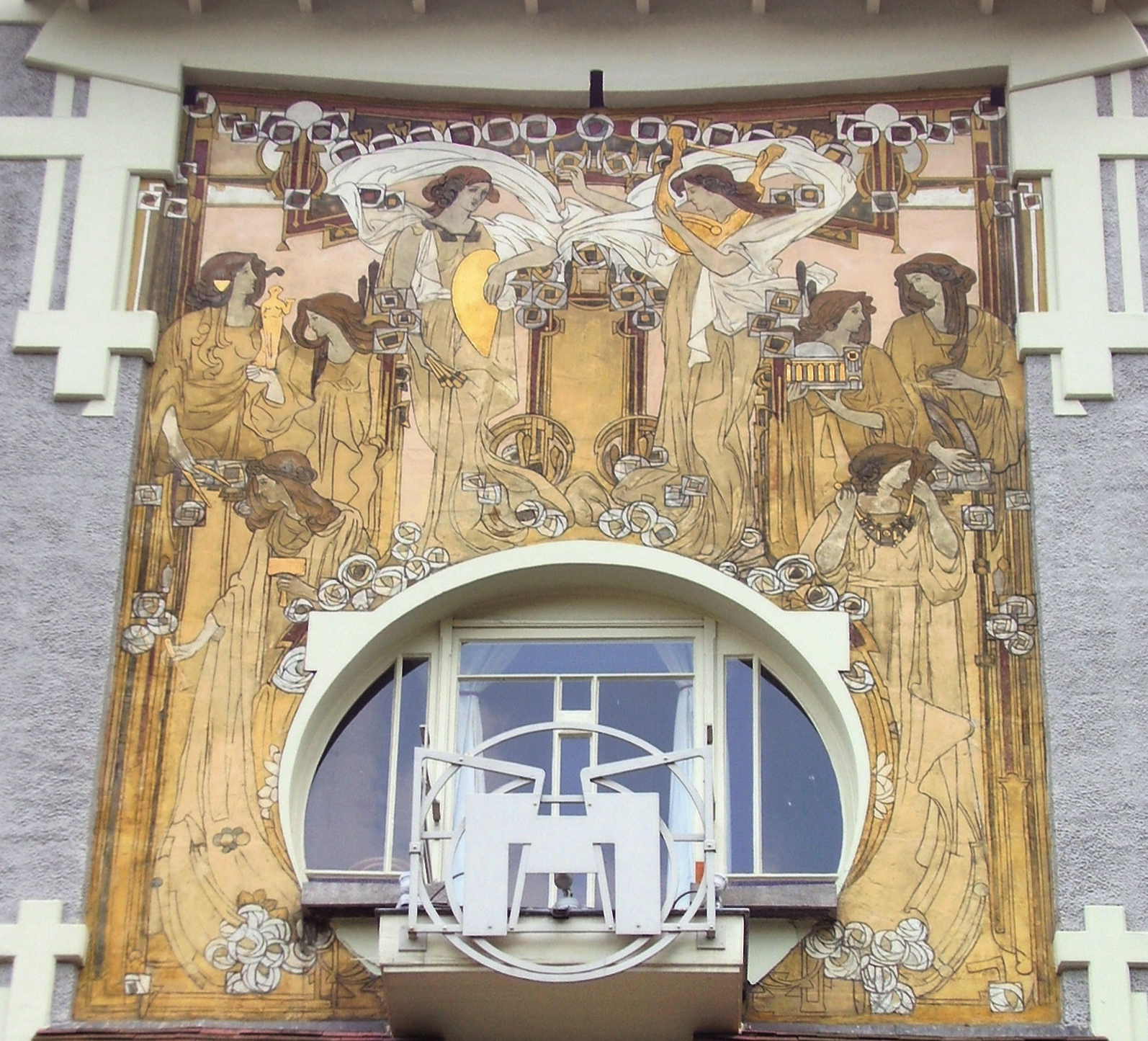
Cauchie House, Brussels

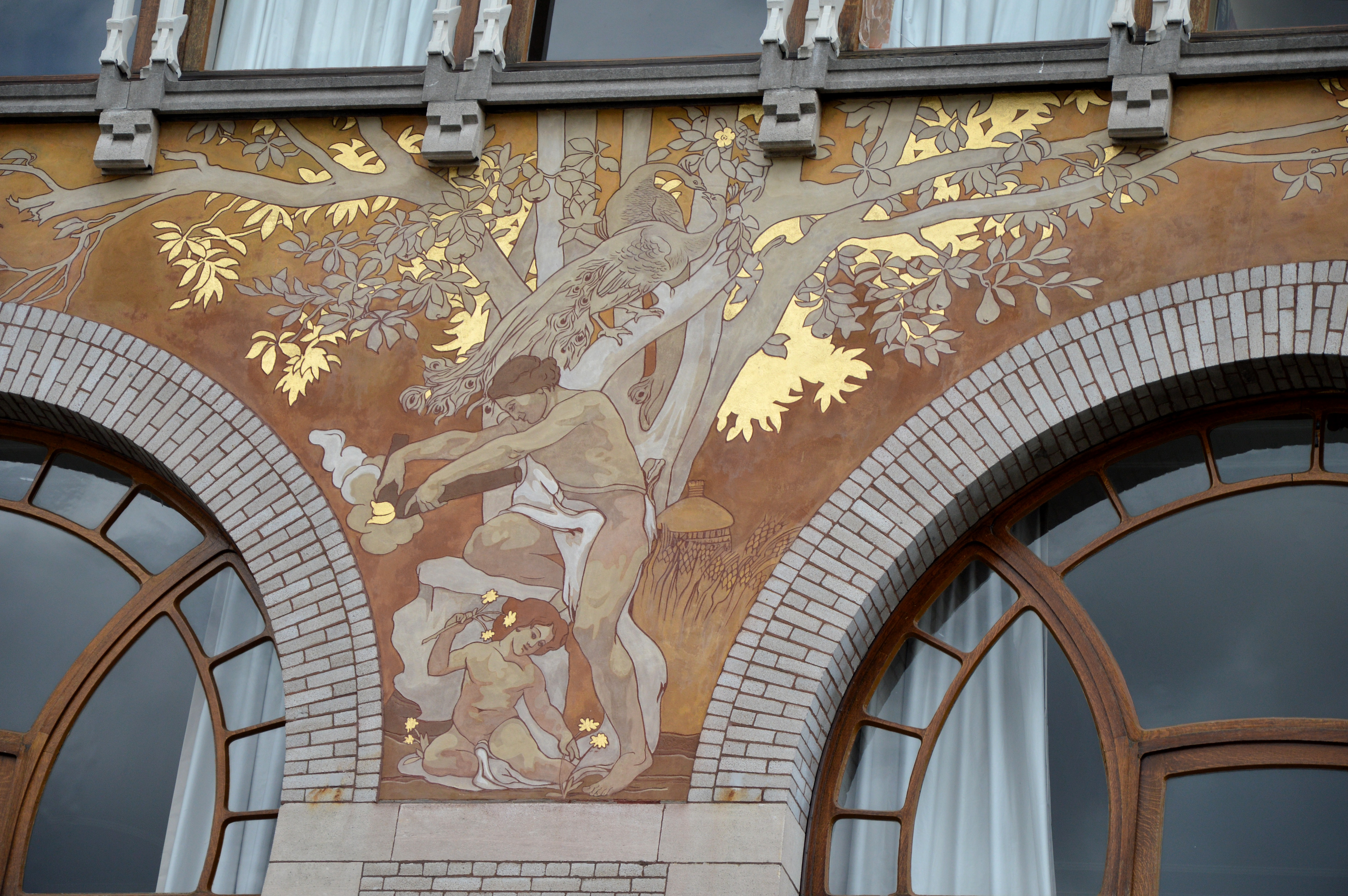
Detail of Hôtel Albert Ciamberlani, Brussels

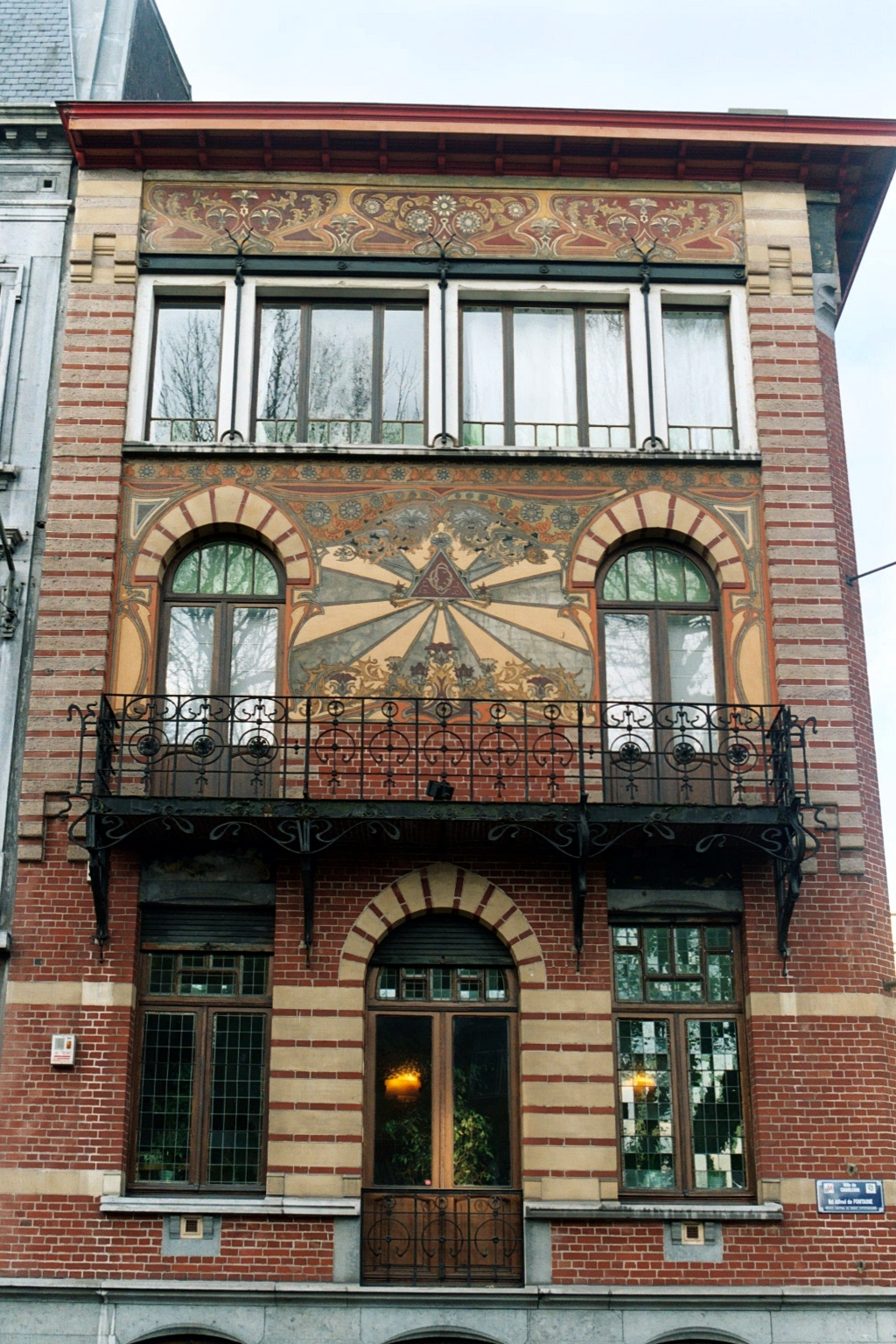
Golden House, sgraffiti by Gabriel van Dievoet, Charleroi, 1899

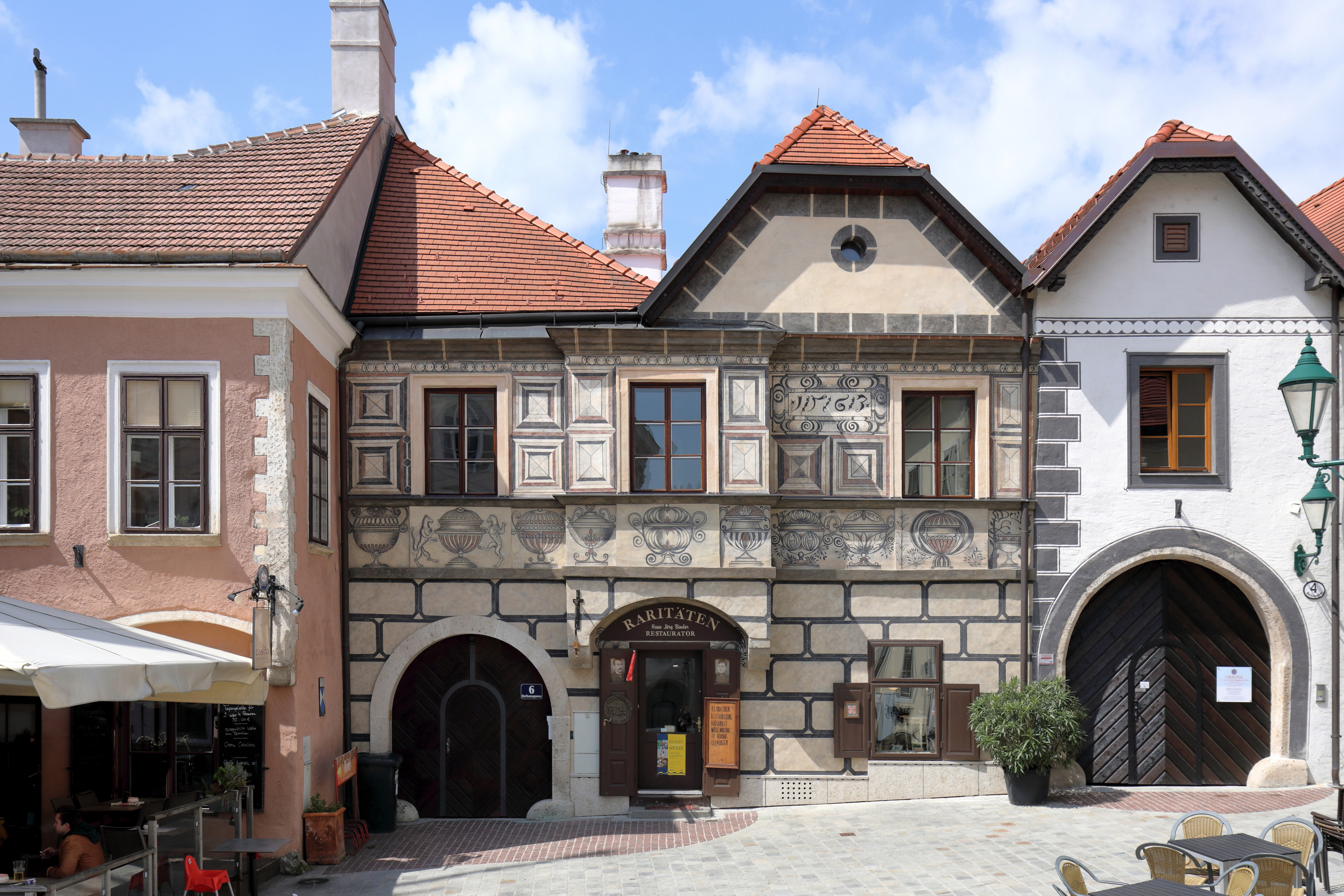
Renaissance façade with sgraffito in Mödling

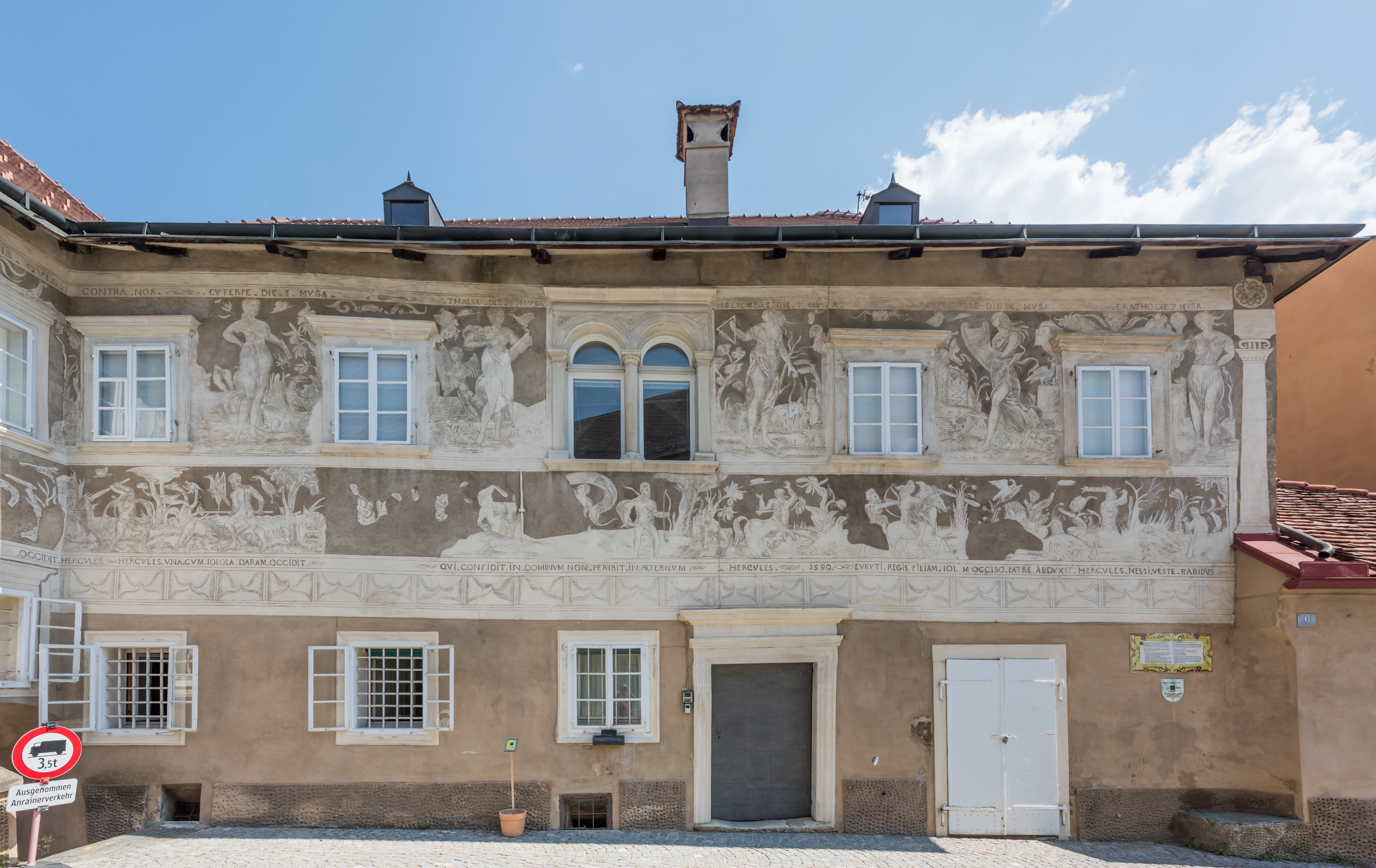
Renaissance façade with sgraffito in Althofen

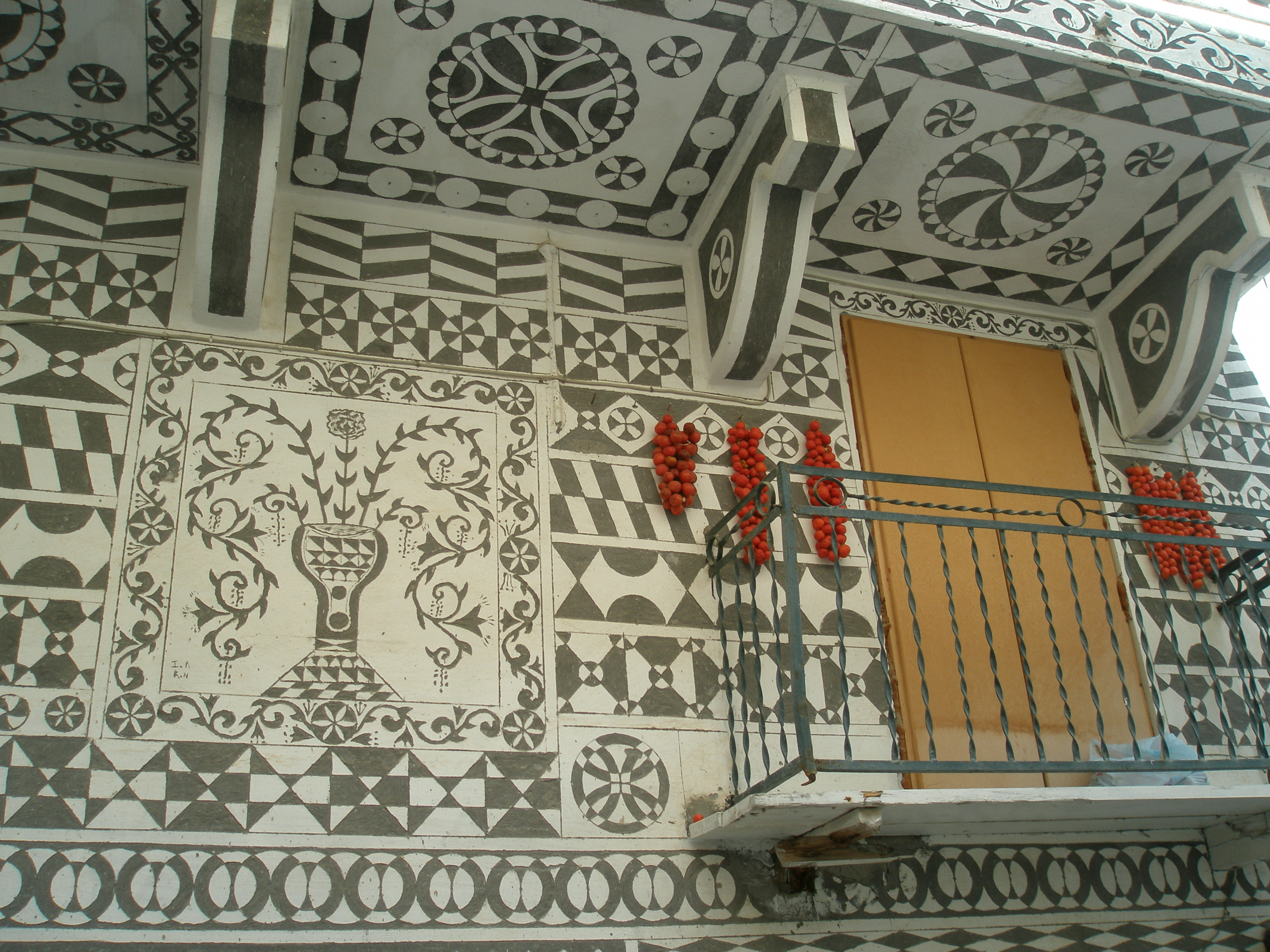
House covered with sgraffito in the village of Pyrgi, Mastichochoria of Chios

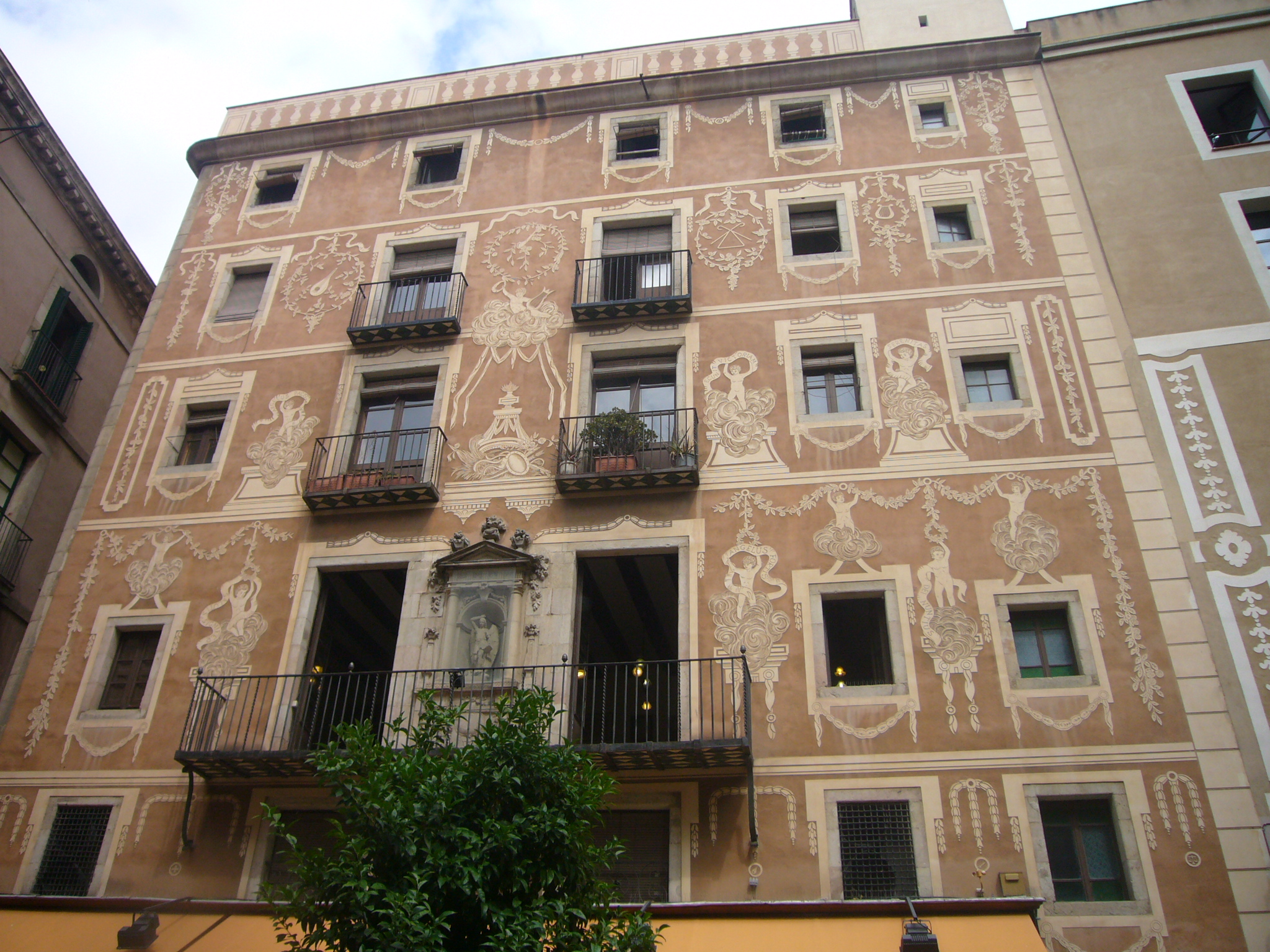
Building in Barcelona

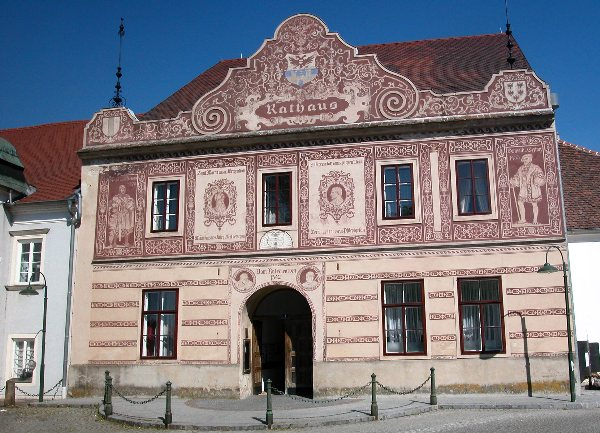
Town hall of Drosendorf-Zissersdorf

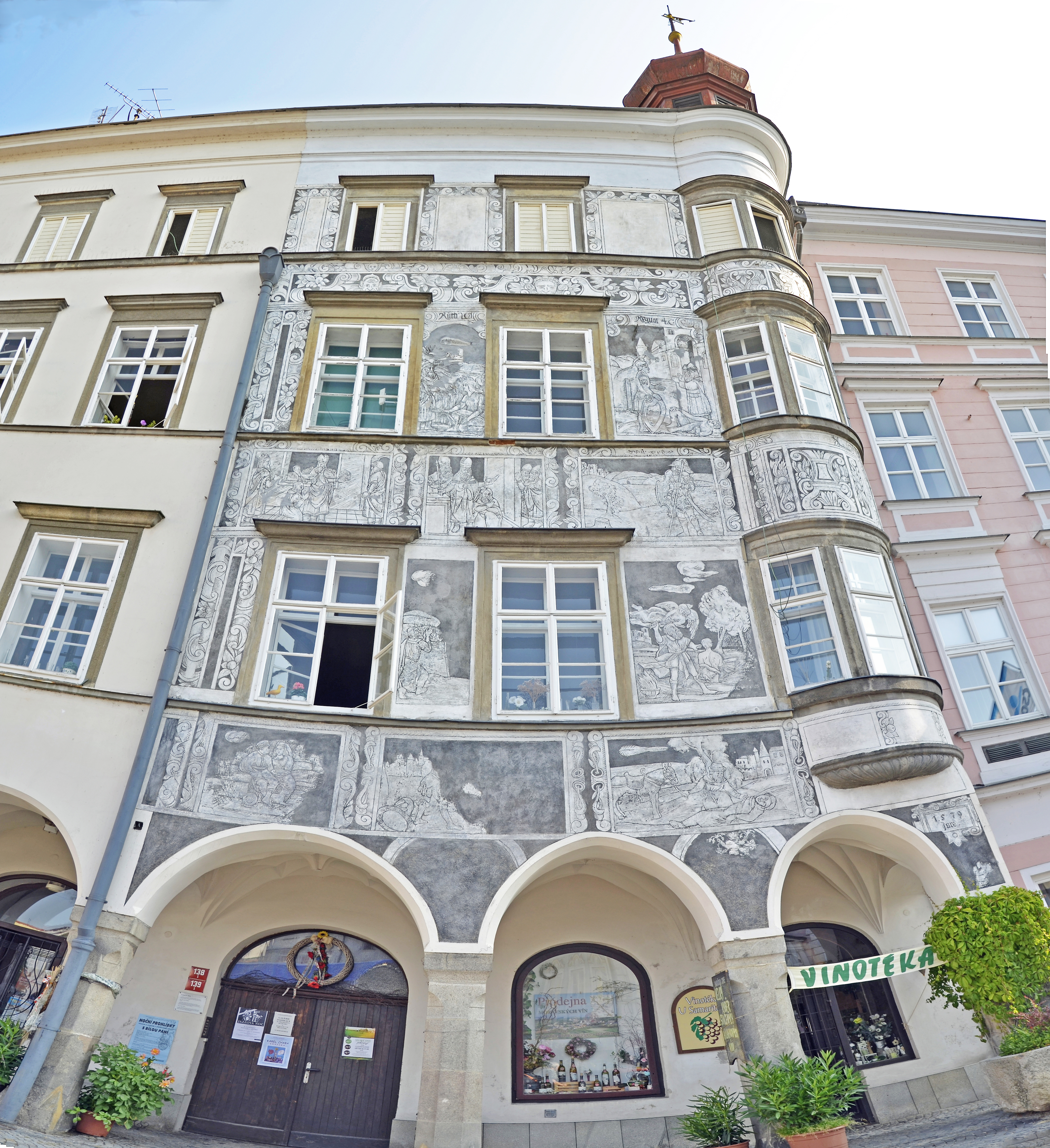
Building in Jindřichův Hradec

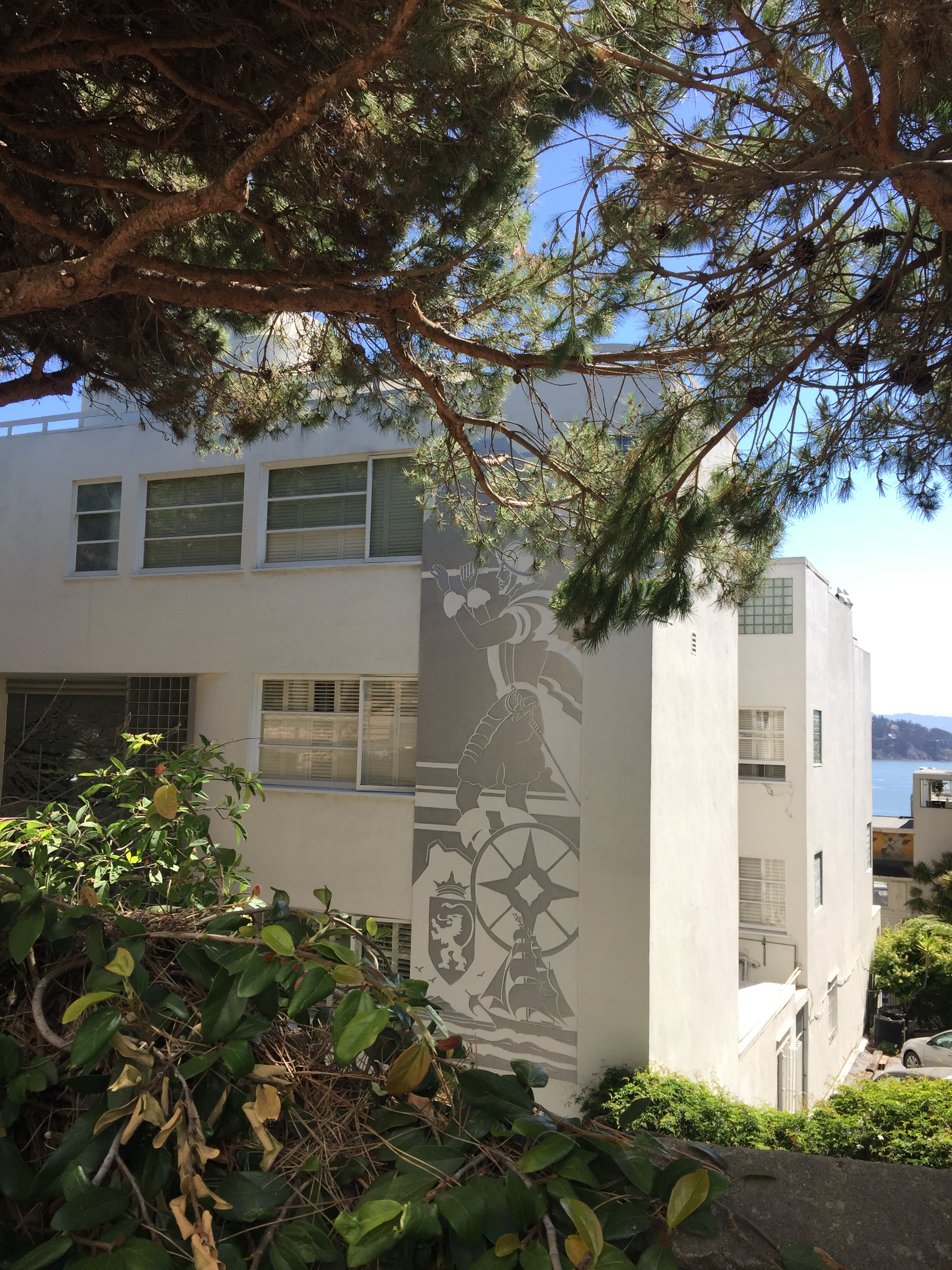
Sgraffito mural on the Malloch Building in San Francisco

== See also ==
- List of art techniques
- Scagliola
- Stucco
- Terrazzo
- Venetian plaster
- Scratchboard
