= Hôtel Albert Ciamberlani =

Historic Art Nouveau house in Brussels, Belgium

- Hôtel Albert Ciamberlani (French); Huis Albert Ciamberlani (Dutch)
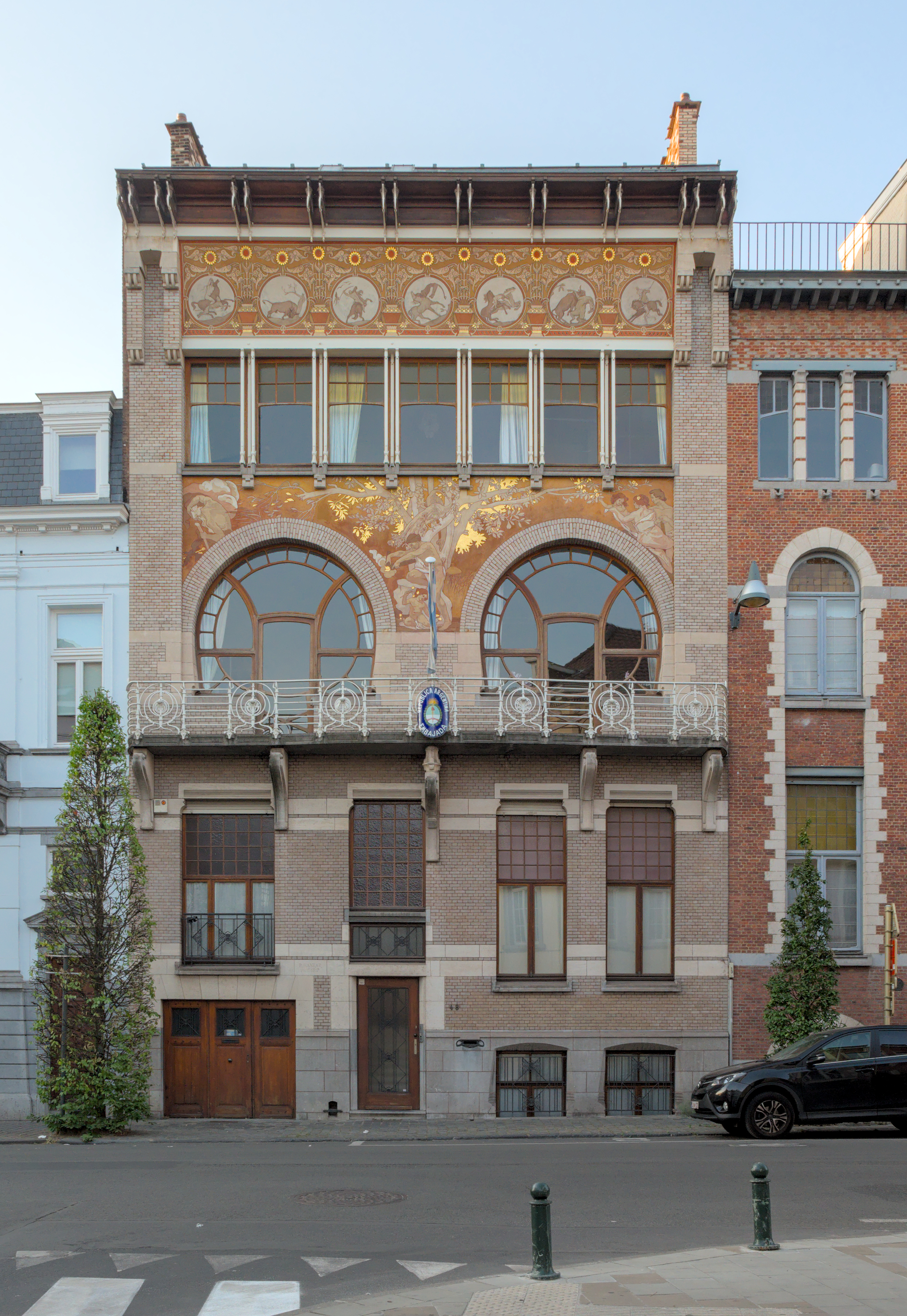
- Main façade of the Hôtel Albert Ciamberlani
- Interactive map of the Hôtel Albert Ciamberlani area

General information
- Type: Town house
- Architectural style: Art Nouveau
- Location: Rue Defacqz / Defacqzstraat 48, 1050 Ixelles, Brussels-Capital Region, Belgium
- Coordinates: 50°49′40″N 4°21′35″E
- Completed: 1897
- Client: Albert Ciamberlani

Design and construction
- Architect: Paul Hankar
- Designations: Protected (12/01/1983)

The Hôtel Albert Ciamberlani (French: Hôtel Albert Ciamberlani; Dutch: Huis Albert Ciamberlani), occasionally also referred to as the Hôtel Veuve Ciamberlani (meaning House of Widow Ciamberlani), is a historic town house in Brussels, Belgium. It was built in 1897 as the private residence of the symbolist painter Albert Ciamberlani and commissioned by his mother. The architect was Paul Hankar, but Ciamberlani himself provided the designs for the large allegorical sgraffito decoration on the façade.

The building, which was renovated in 2006, is one of the best-preserved buildings by Hankar. It is described in the official list of architectural heritage of Brussels as an "exceptional private house in Art Nouveau style" and art historian François Loyer has described its façade as one of the most beautiful Art Nouveau façades in Belgium.

The house is located at 48, rue Defacqz/Defacqzstraat in the municipality of Ixelles, a few steps from the Hankar House, another Art Nouveau building by Hankar.

== History ==
Paul Hankar received the commission to design the building from the mother of the symbolist painter Albert Ciamberlani, soon after having finished a project for a private residence for his friend Henri Renkin in 1897. The large lot was almost opposite his own house on the Rue Defacqz/Defacqzstraat. Hankar also produced designs for the house of Albert's brother, José Ciamberlani, in the vicinity.

Hankar initially struggled with finding a solution for the unusually wide façade (12 metres (39 ft)). In his first draft, the façade was dominated by large windows, with a central bow window. The second draft split the façade in a broadly uniform, upper part and a lower part, which was divided around a central axis, but retained the dominance of glasswork. The final design was more complex, and dominated by the large sgraffito designed by Ciamberlani. The house was built in 1897. It was one of a succession of private houses in Brussels designed by Hankar, mostly for friends, between 1897 and 1900.

In 1927, the lower part of the façade was heavily altered, and a garage added. The architect Albert Devez was responsible for these changes. The original furniture, also designed by Hankar, has been dispersed and is now kept in the collections of Design Museum Gent in Ghent, Belgium.

The building has been listed since 1983. The façade was renovated in 2006. The Hôtel Ciamberlani is one of the most well-preserved buildings designed by Hankar.

== Description ==
For the final design of the façade, Hankar came up with a complex solution where several different influences coexist. A motif of round openings, inspired by traditional Chinese moon gates, is superimposed over a façade divided horizontally in a way that is inspired by medieval architecture, conveyed via Hankar's contemporaries Antoni Gaudí and Richard Morris Hunt. It is dominated by two materials, white brick from Silesia and white stone from Euville, providing a juxtaposition of colours. In the central section, the façade becomes more monumental as it is dominated by the two large, horseshoe arch windows, and the geometric decoration of the rest of the façade expands into a richer, floral decoration.

The top of the façade is dominated by the sgraffito decoration designed by Ciamberlani and executed by Adolphe Crespin. It consists of a large, central composition and, just under the roof, a string of medallions. The central composition depicts in allegorical form the different stages of life, under the canopy of a large pear tree. The medallions have been proposed to depict either the Labours of Hercules or hunting scenes. Ciamberlani's decoration for the façade shows influence from the works of Walter Crane and similarities with works by Antoine Bourdelle.

Art historian François Loyer has described its façade as one of the most beautiful Art Nouveau façades in Belgium. He notes that it lacks what he calls the "Gothic" element of Louis XV style, "which artists of the time abused, both in Brussels and Nancy". In the official list of architectural heritage of Brussels it is described more succinctly as an "exceptional private house in the geometrical Art Nouveau style."

Inside, the spatial layout was a more traditional variation of a layout found in many Belgian houses at the time, with the exception of the first floor, which was dominated by a wide room facing the street. For the rest, the right side of the building contained the drawing room, dining room and a veranda, while the left side of the building contained an office, the stairwell and a smaller dining room. The top floor contained four bedrooms, and two bedrooms were also located on the main floor.

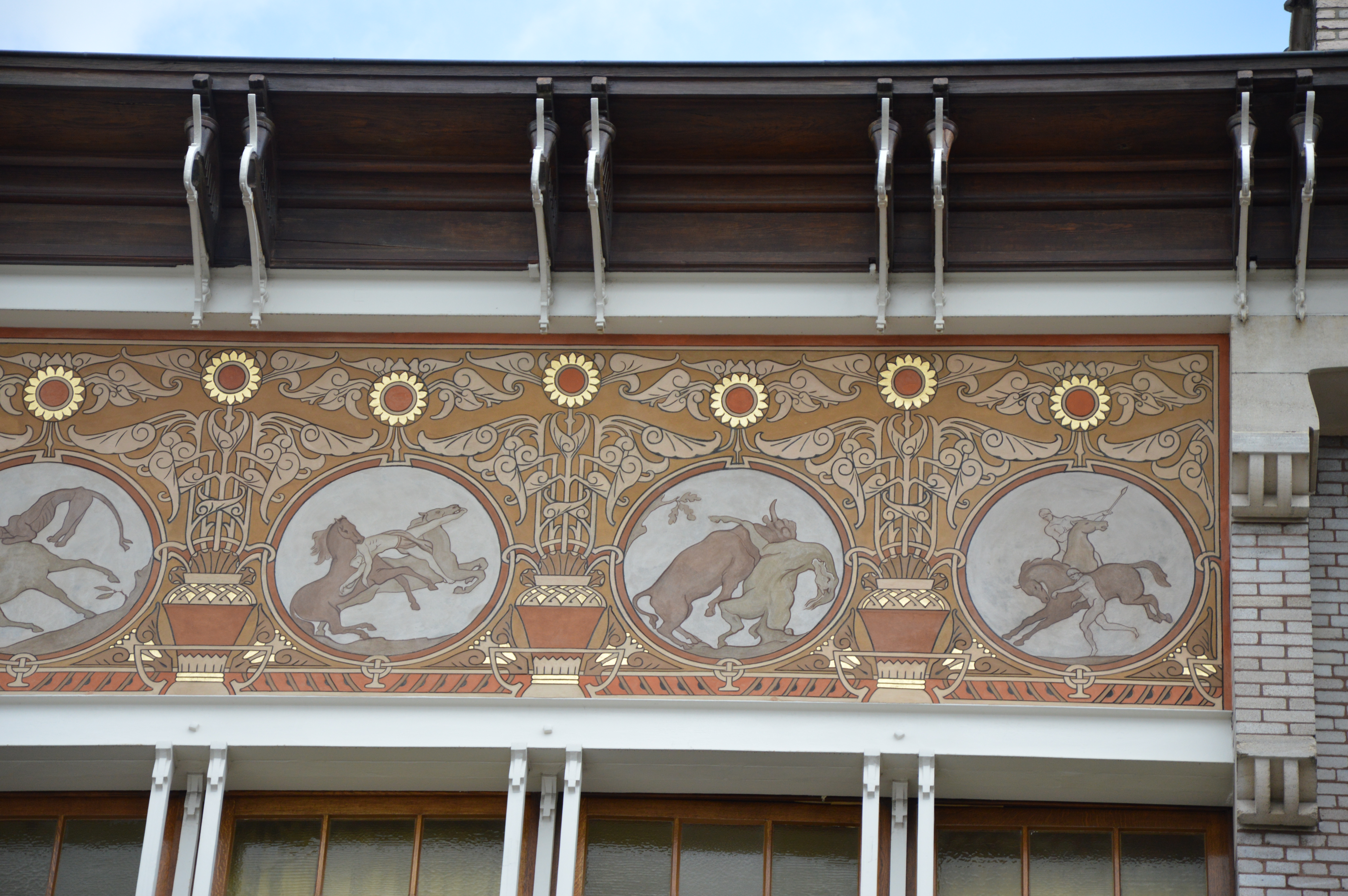
Sgraffito medallions at the top of the façade

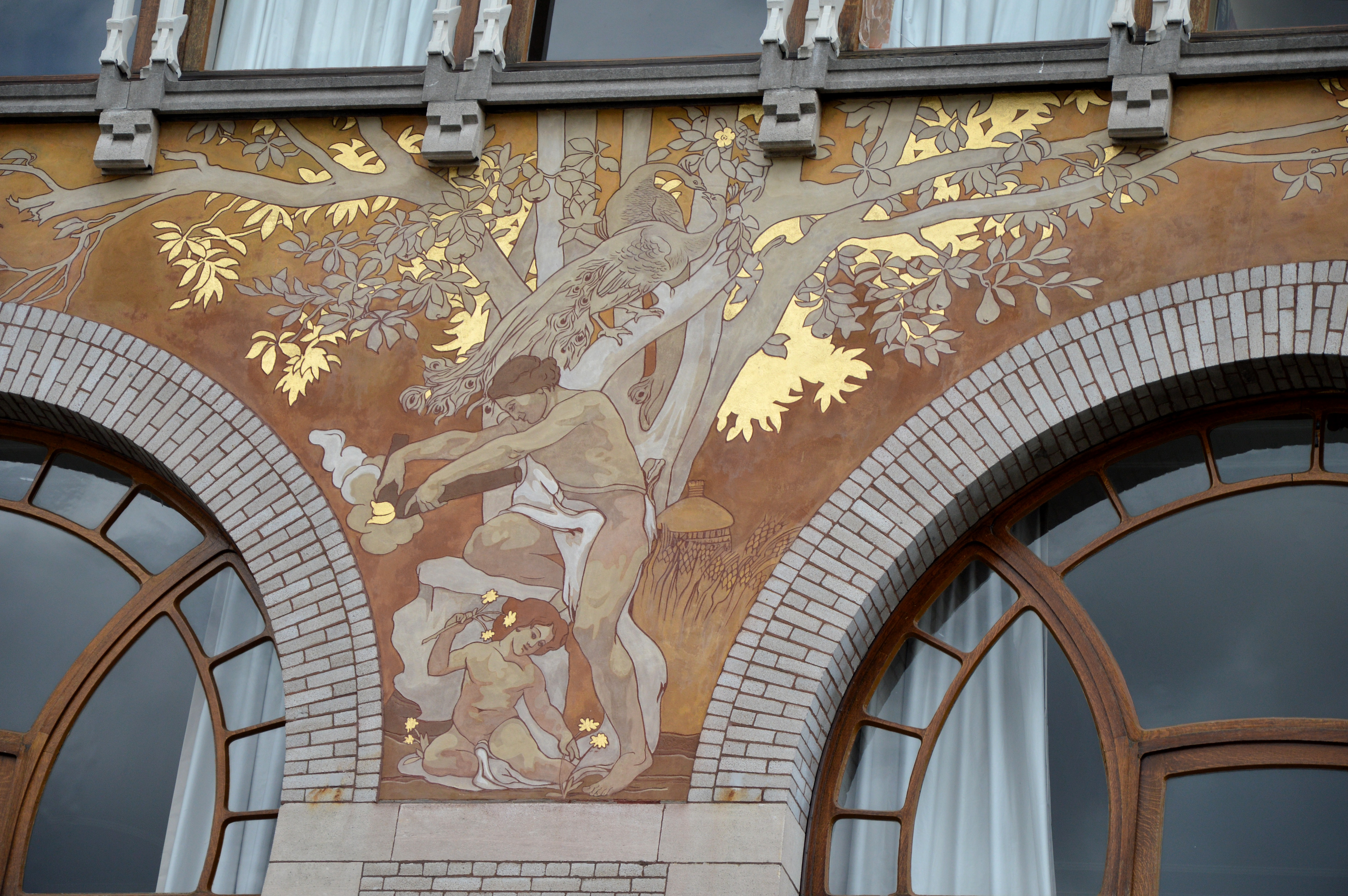
Detail of the sgraffito decoration

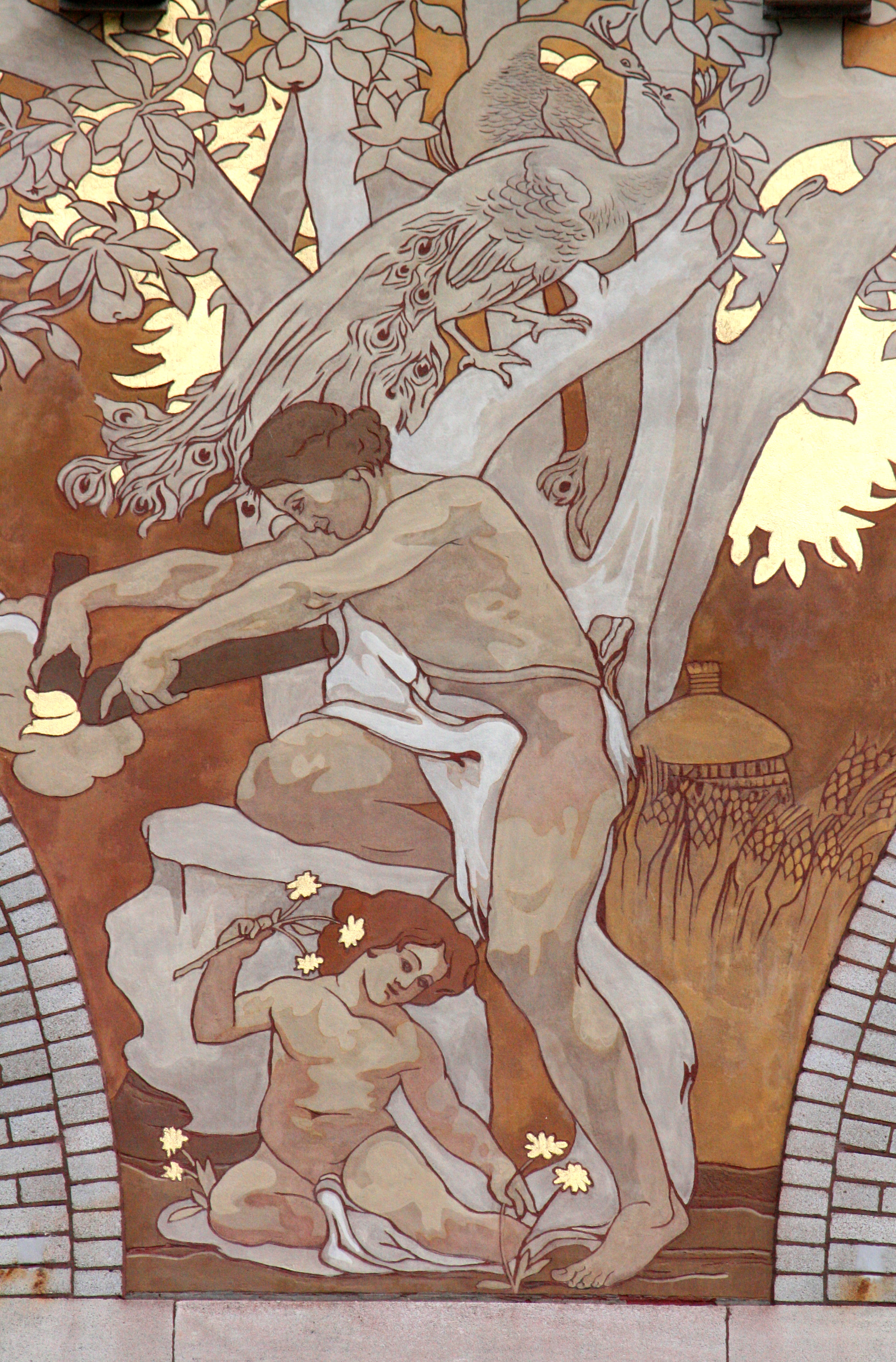
Closeup of the sgraffito

== See also ==
- Art Nouveau in Brussels
- History of Brussels
- Culture of Belgium
- Belgium in the long nineteenth century
