= Paul Hankar =

Belgian architect and furniture designer

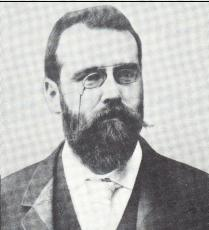
- Hankar c. 1890
- Born: 11 December 1859; Frameries, Hainaut, Belgium
- Died: 17 January 1901 (aged 41); Brussels, Brabant, Belgium
- Occupation: Architect
- Buildings: Hankar House (1893); Chemiserie Niguet (1896); Hôtel Albert Ciamberlani (1897)
- Projects: Cité des Artistes (1896, unbuilt); New Brussels (1897, unbuilt)

Paul Hankar (French: [pɔl ɑ̃kaʁ]; 11 December 1859 – 17 January 1901) was a Belgian architect and furniture designer. Together with Victor Horta and Henry van de Velde, he is considered one of the founders of Art Nouveau in Belgium.

== Career ==
Hankar was born at Frameries, in Hainaut, Belgium, the son of a stonemason. He studied at the Royal Academy of Fine Arts in Brussels, where he met fellow student (and future architect) Victor Horta. Like Horta, he closely studied the techniques of forged iron, which he would later use in many of his buildings. He began his career as a designer and sculptor of funeral monuments. From 1879 to 1894, he worked in the studio of the architect Henri Beyaert, a master of eclectic and neoclassical architecture. Through Beyaert, Hankar became an admirer of Eugène Viollet-le-Duc, the French architect who advocated the use of innovative new materials such as iron and glass, while drawing from historical architecture for inspiration. Under Beyaert, he was chief designer for the Palacio de Chávarri (1889) in Bilbao, Spain, constructed for the businessman Víctor Chávarri.

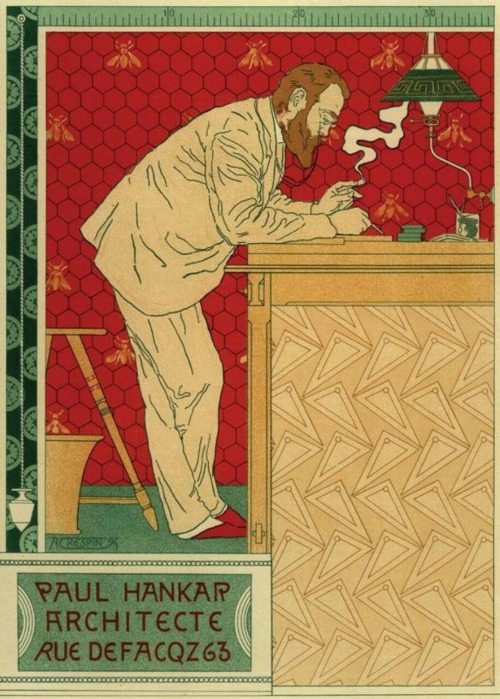
Portrait of Paul Hankar in a poster by Adolphe Crespin, c. 1894

He opened his own office in Brussels in 1893, and began the construction of his own house, the Hankar House, at 71, rue Defacqz/Defacqzstraat, in the Saint-Gilles municipality of Brussels. This and Victor Horta's Hôtel Tassel (constructed at the same time), are considered the first two houses built in the Art Nouveau style. A circa-1894 poster by his friend and frequent collaborator, Adolphe Crespin, advertises Hankar's practice there. The Hankar House's façade expresses the building's structure—the eastern third, containing the entrance and stairs, is offset a half-story from the western two-thirds, containing the public rooms. A three-story projecting box-bay, supported on stone corbels, provides ample light to the second and third floor rooms and a balcony for the fourth. Mural panels by Crespin appear under the windows and in an arcaded frieze at the eaves. The interplay between heavy neo-Renaissance elements and materials versus light Art Nouveau detailing and decoration results in a vivid composition.

In 1896, he presented a project for a Cité des Artistes ("City of Artists") for the seaside town of Westende, in West Flanders, Belgium, an artists' cooperative with housing and studios. Although the project never was realized, it would later inspire the Darmstadt Artists' Colony in Darmstadt, Germany, and the artists of the Vienna Secession. For the 1897 World's Fair in Brussels, he contributed to the design of the Congo section, which became known for its full employment of the Art Nouveau. He also lectured on "New Brussels," his vision for an urban redevelopment of the city, that was never realized. Later that year, he participated in the Colonial Exposition in Tervuren, near Brussels, where he coordinated the works of several artisans and furniture designers.

He designed a monumental stone bench (1898–99), carved by the Ecausines and Soignies quarries, to be exhibited in the Mine and Metallurgy Section of the Exposition Universelle (1900) in Paris. King Leopold II of Belgium bought the bench at the close of the exposition, and donated it to a park in the Koninginlaan neighborhood of Ostend, where it was installed by 1905. The bench was removed in 1971 to expand a parking lot, and destroyed. Using Hankar's surviving drawings, a replica bench was carved for the park (2003–04), and installed on the same foundations as the original.

During his career, he was a professor of engineering at the School of Applied Arts in Schaerbeek (1891–97), and a professor of architectural history at the Institut des Hautes Etudes of the University of Brussels (1897–1901). He worked as editor of L'Emulation (1894–96), a magazine that promoted the Art Nouveau style.

He died in January 1901 at the age of 41, when his work was just becoming known, but his style influenced the work of younger Brussels' artists, including Paul Hamesse, Léon Sneyers, Antoine Pompe and the modernist Victor Bourgeois.

== Hankar and Horta ==
The first Art Nouveau houses of Hankar and Horta were completed in the same year, 1893, and the styles of the two architects were similar in several ways. They both renounced traditional historical styles, made visible use of new materials, such as glass and iron, and had as well a strong preference for arches, and for curving lines, a style sometimes called à membrures, which characterised the early work of both architects. There was a great difference, however, in their available budgets; Hankar was building homes for his artist friends, with modest budgets, while Horta had very wealthy patrons, who could afford expensive materials and larger houses. The chief feature of Horta's houses was the interior, while the focus of Hankar's houses was primarily the façade. Hankar believed that Horta's work was excessively lavish; he called it "Louis XV".

== Selected works ==
=== Buildings ===
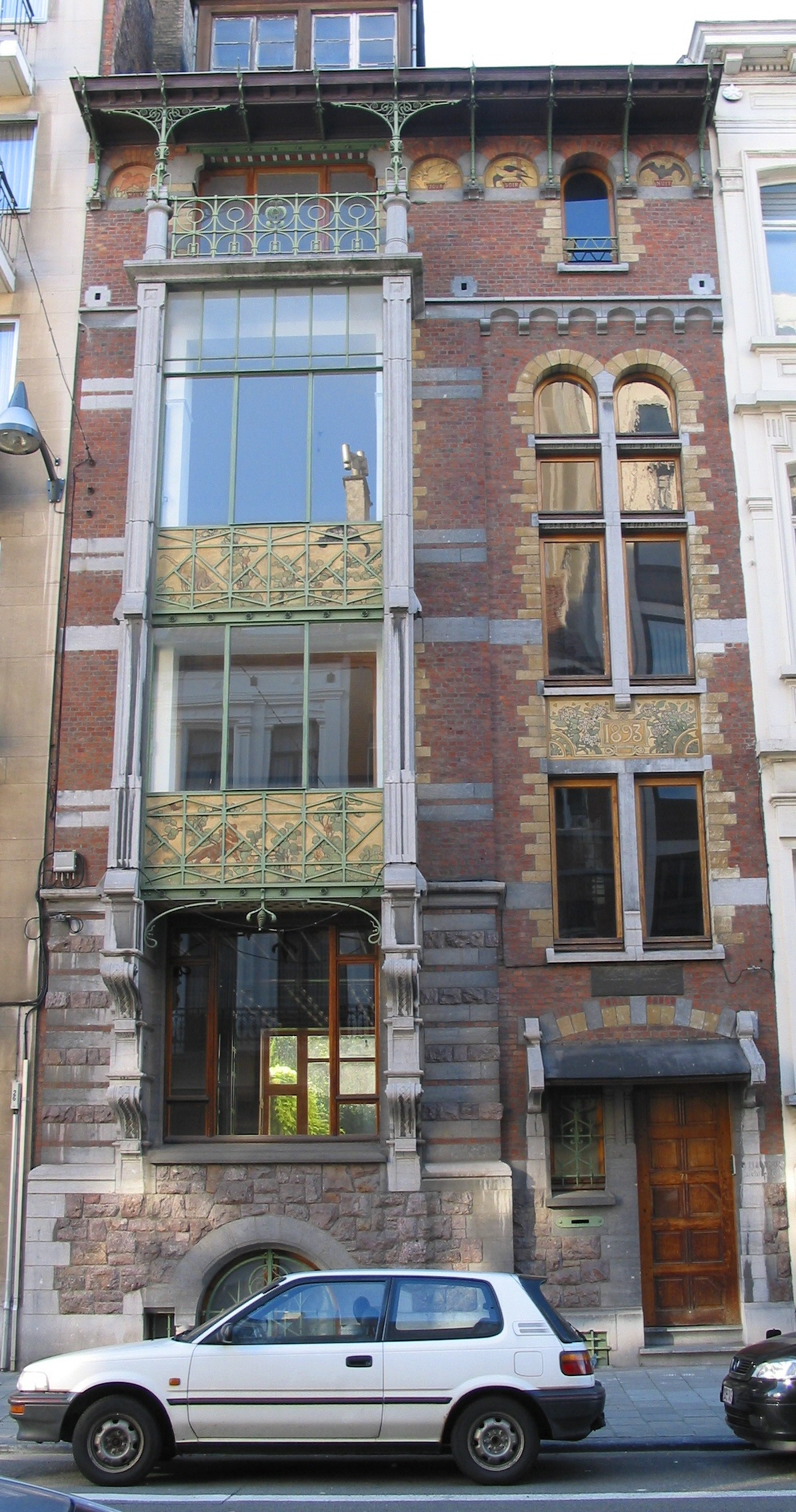
Façade of the Hankar House, Brussels (1893)

- Mausoleum of Charles Rogier, Saint-Josse-ten-Noode Cemetery, Brussels (1870s).
- Palacio de Chávarri, Plaza Elíptica, Bilbao, Spain (1888–89). Designed while Hankar worked in Hendrik Beyaert's office.
- Atelier Alfred Crick (Studio of Alfred Crick), 64 Rue Simonis, Ixelles, Brussels (1891).
- Jan van Beers Monument (1891), Antwerp.
- Hankar House, 71 Rue Defacqz, Brussels (1893).
- Jaspar Houses, 76, 78 & 80 Rue de la Croix de Pierre, Brussels (1894).
- Hanssens Houses, 13 & 15 Avenue Edouard Ducpétiaux, Brussels (1894).
- Zegers-Regnard House, 83 Chaussée de Charleroi, Brussels (1894–95).
- 47 Avenue Edouard Ducpétiaux, Brussels (1895).
- Chemiserie Niguet, 13 Rue Royale, Brussels (1896).
- Peeters House and Pharmacy, 6-8 Rue Lebeau, Brussels (1896).
- Boulangerie Timmermans, 551 Rue De Herve, Liège (1896, demolished). The three-story façade was covered by murals by Adolphe Crespin.
- Hôtel Renkin, Brussels (1897, demolished).
- Hôtel Albert Ciamberlani, 48 Rue Defacqz, Brussels (1897).
- Sanatorium (1897), Kraainem.
- Hôtel Janssens, 50 Rue Defacqz, Brussels (1898).
- Hôtel Kleyer, 25 Rue de Ruysbroeck, Brussels (1898).
- Aglave House, 7 Rue Antoine Bréart, Brussels (1898).
- Bartholomé House and Studio, Brussels (1898, demolished).
- Jean-François Willems Monument, Place Saint-Bavon, Ghent (1899), Isidore De Rudder, sculptor. Hankar designed the pedestal.
- Monumental stone bench – exhibited at the Exposition Universelle (1900) in Paris – (1898–99, demolished 1971). Replica stone bench, Koninginlaan Park, Ostend (2003–04).
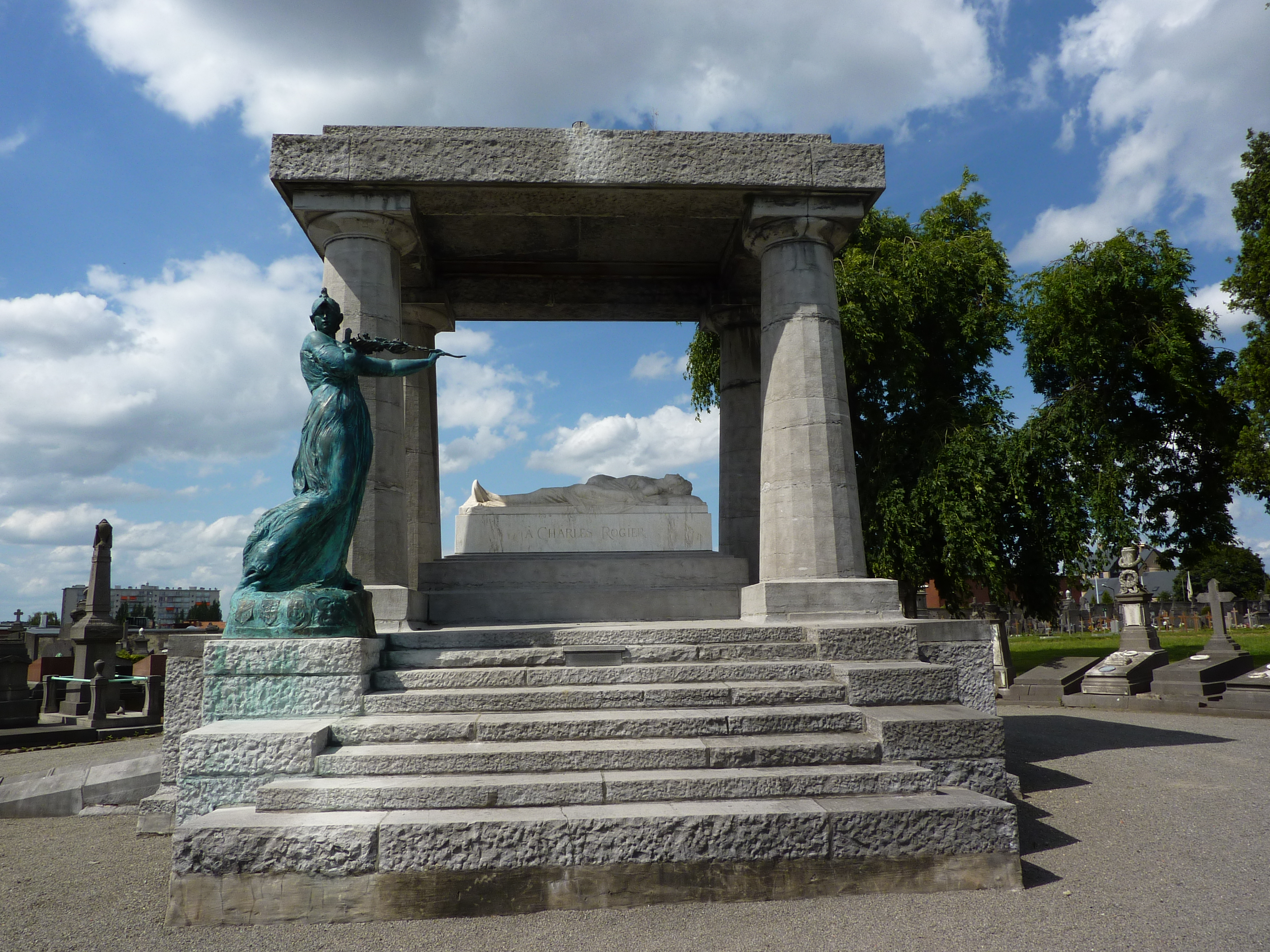
Mausoleum of Charles Rogier, Brussels (1870s)

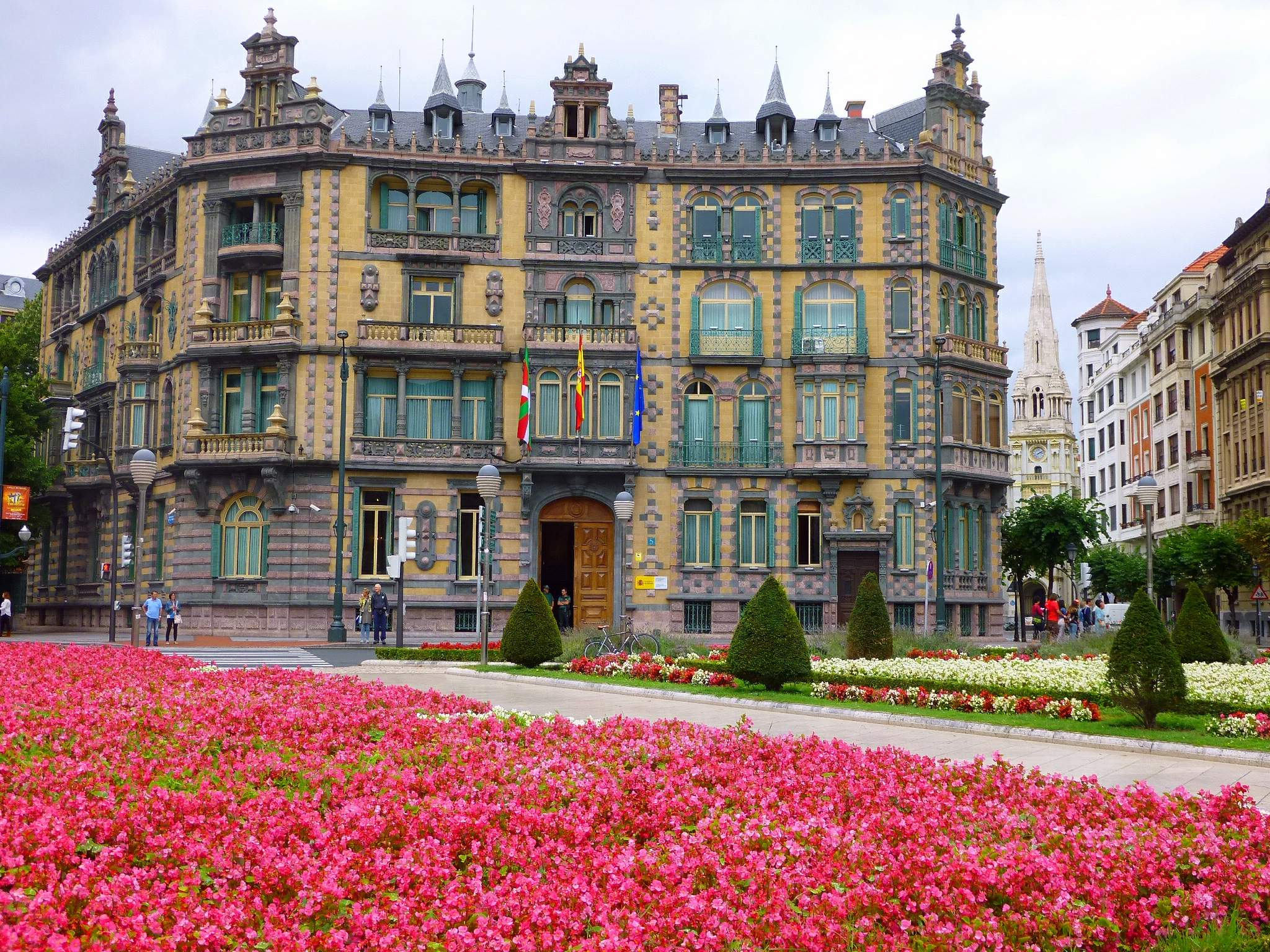
Palacio de Chávarri, Bilbao, Spain (1888–89)

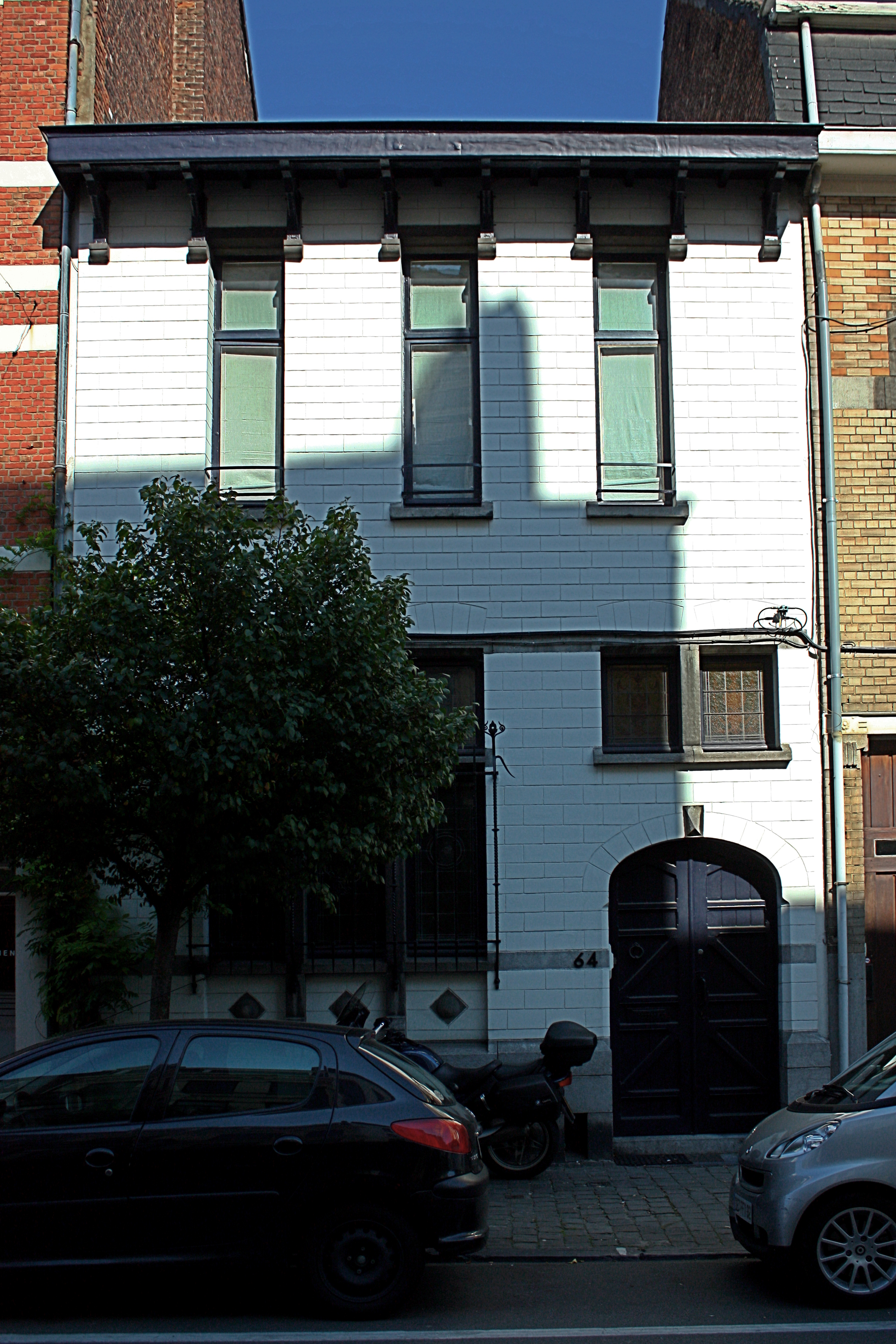
Studio of Alfred Crick, Brussels (1891)

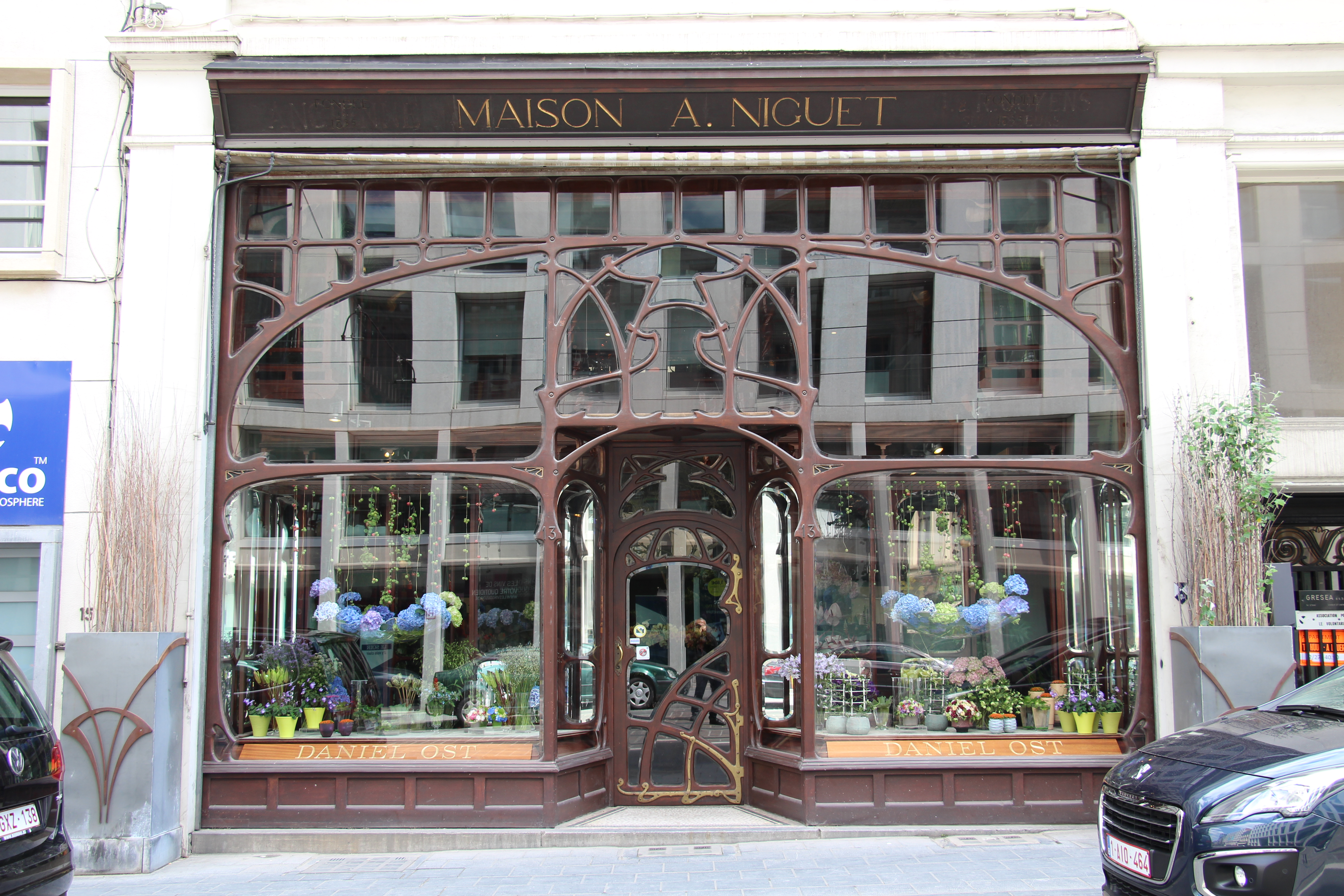
Former Chemiserie Niguet storefront on the Rue Royale/Koningsstraat, Brussels (1896)

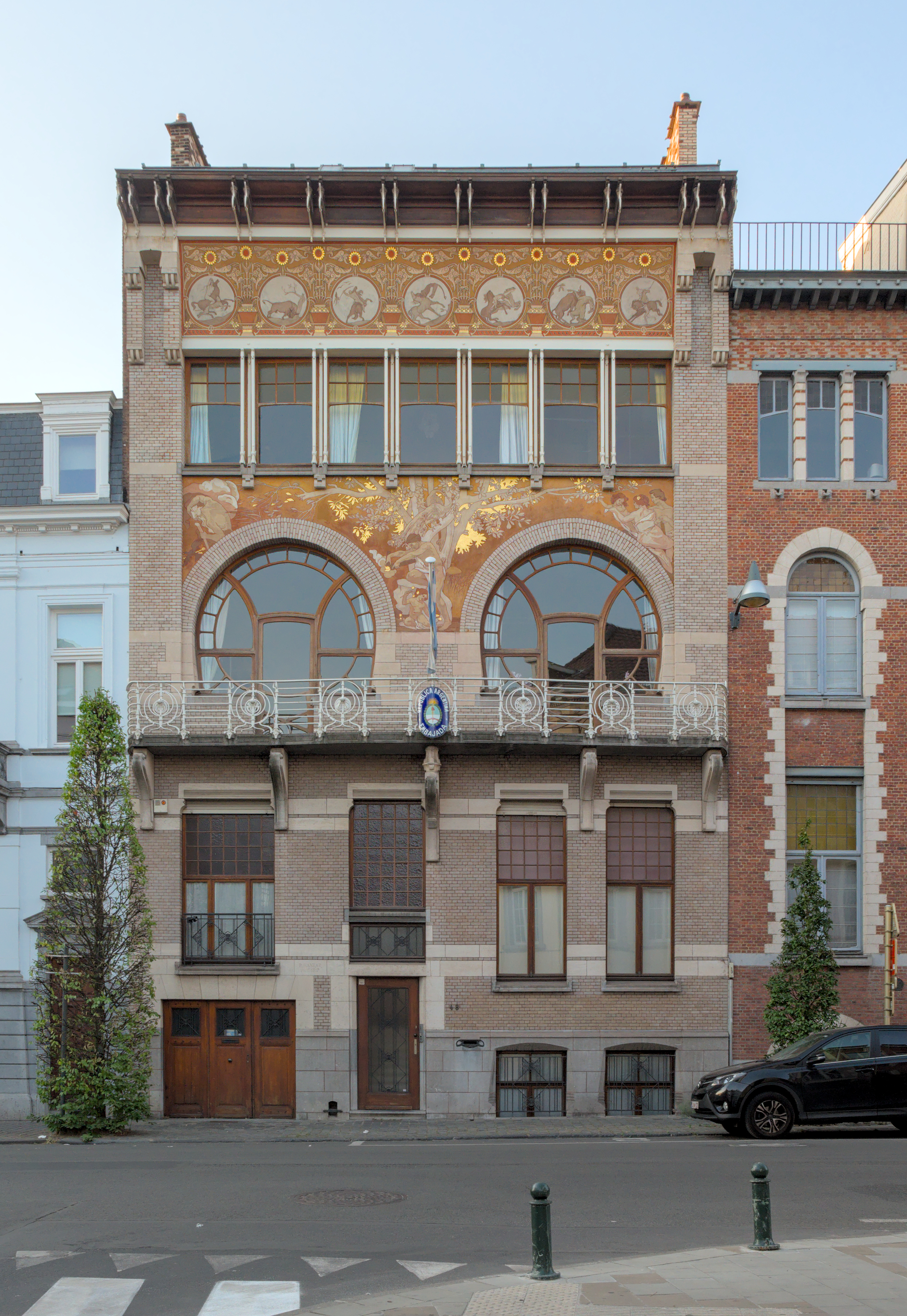
Hôtel Albert Ciamberlani, Brussels (1897)

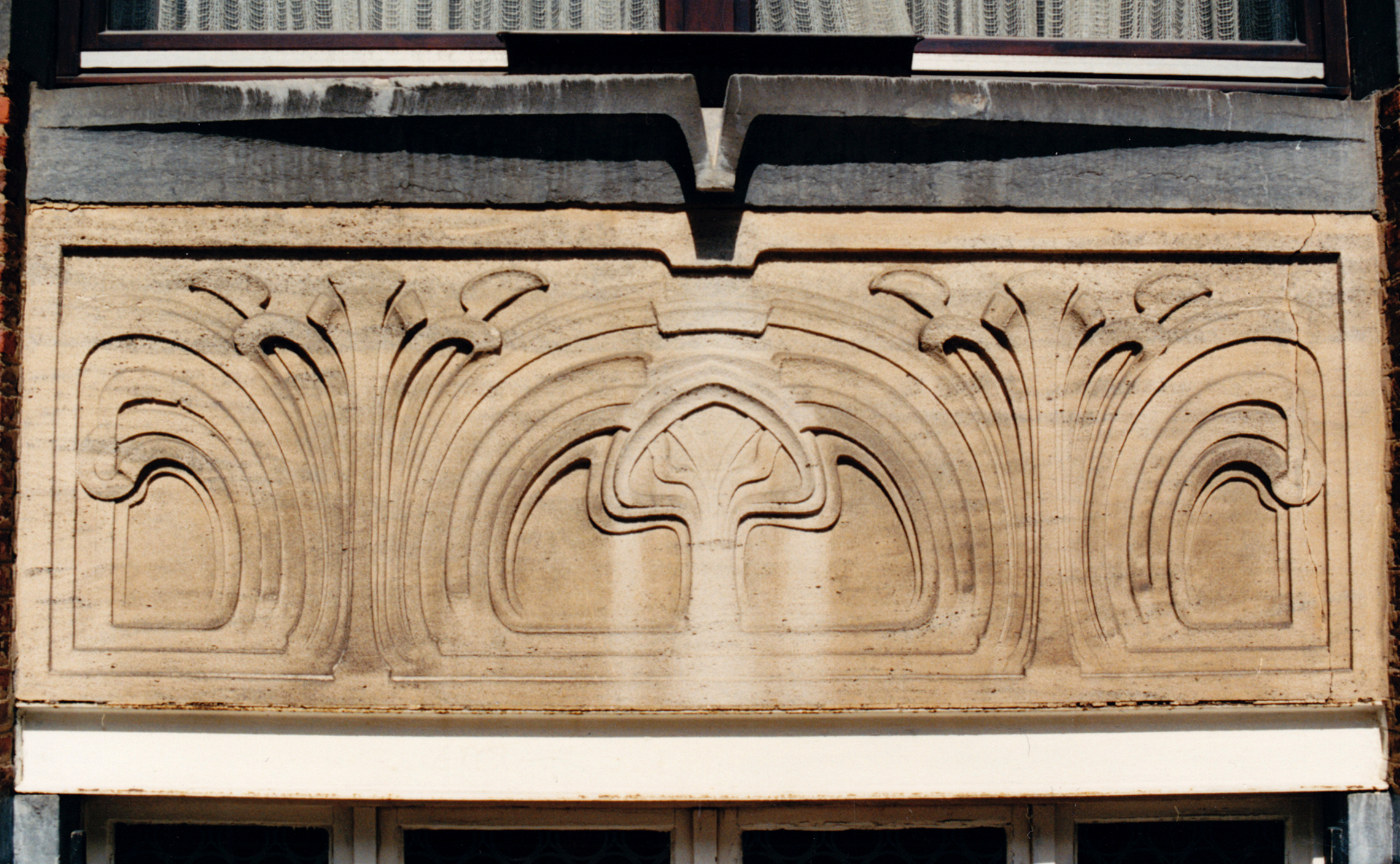
Bas-relief panel on the façade of the Aglave House, Brussels (1898)

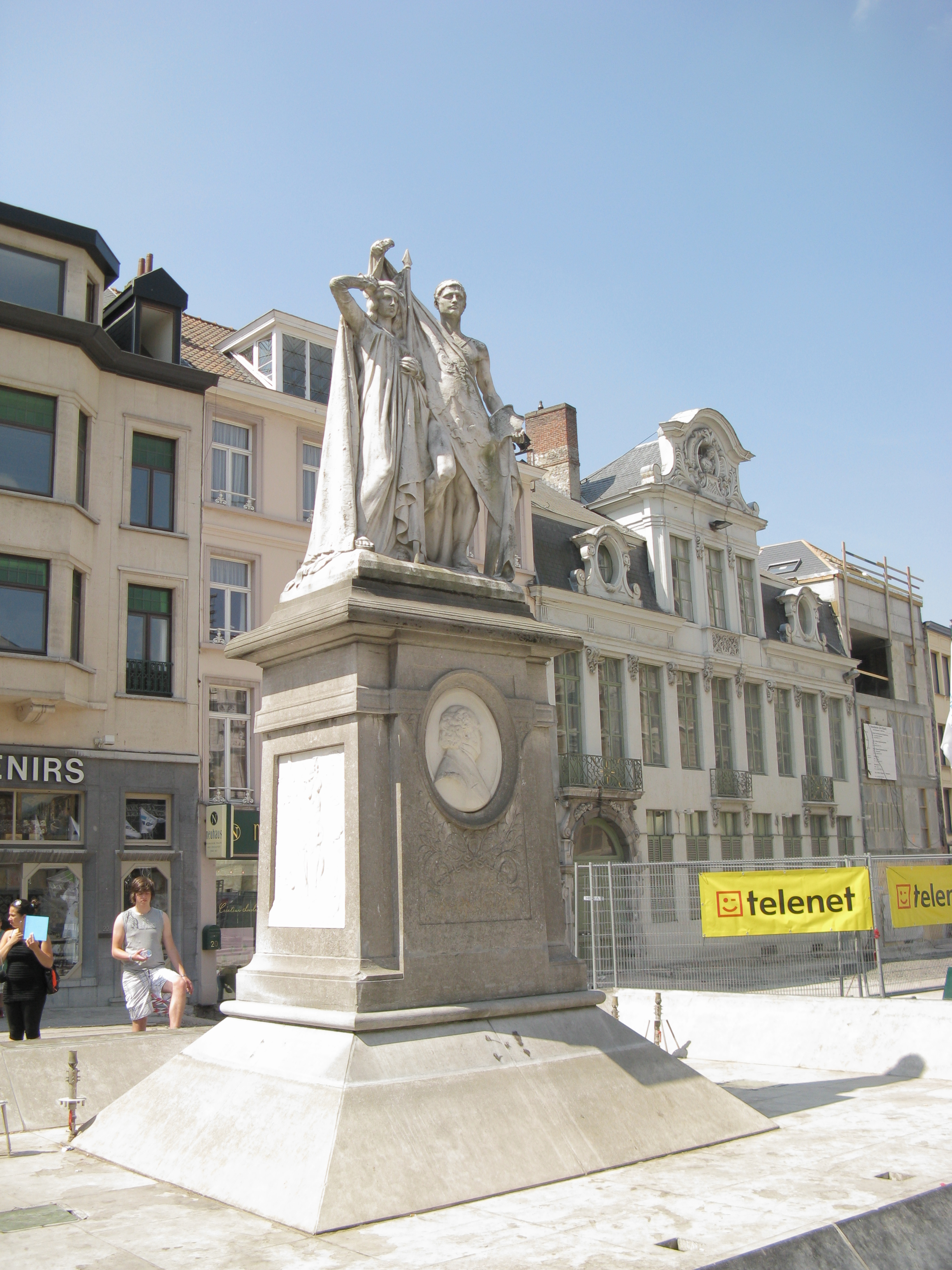
Willems Monument, Ghent (1899)

=== Furniture and interiors ===
- Stool (ca. 1893), Design Museum, Ghent.
- Chair (1896), Royal Museums of Art and History, Brussels. Exhibited at the 1897 Exposition Internationale de Bruxelles.
- Mailbox (1897), Nelson-Atkins Museum of Art, Kansas City, Missouri.
- Coffee table from Hôtel Renkin (1897), Design Museum, Ghent.
- Dining table from Hôtel Ciamberlani (1897), Musée d'Orsay, Paris.
- Sideboard from Hôtel Ciamberlani (1897).
- Card table from Hôtel Ciamberlani (1897).
- Side chair from Hôtel Ciamberlani (1897).
- Swivel chair (ca. 1897).
- Chair with woven leather back (ca. 1897).
- Mahogany dining table (ca. 1897), Galerie Yves Macaux (March 2015).
- Furniture and interiors, American Bar and Grill-Room (1897–98), Grand Hôtel de Bruxelles.
  - Pair of folding screens – sold at Christie's Auctions, London, 3 November 2004 – Galerie Yves Macaux (March 2015).
  - Tabouret (stool) – sold at Phillips Auctions, New York, 15 December 2010.
- Stool from Compagnie Générale des Céramiques d'Architecture (1898), Los Angeles County Museum of Art, Los Angeles, California.
  - An identical stool is at Galerie Yves Macaux (March 2015).
- Chair (year), Cinquantenaire Museum, Brussels.
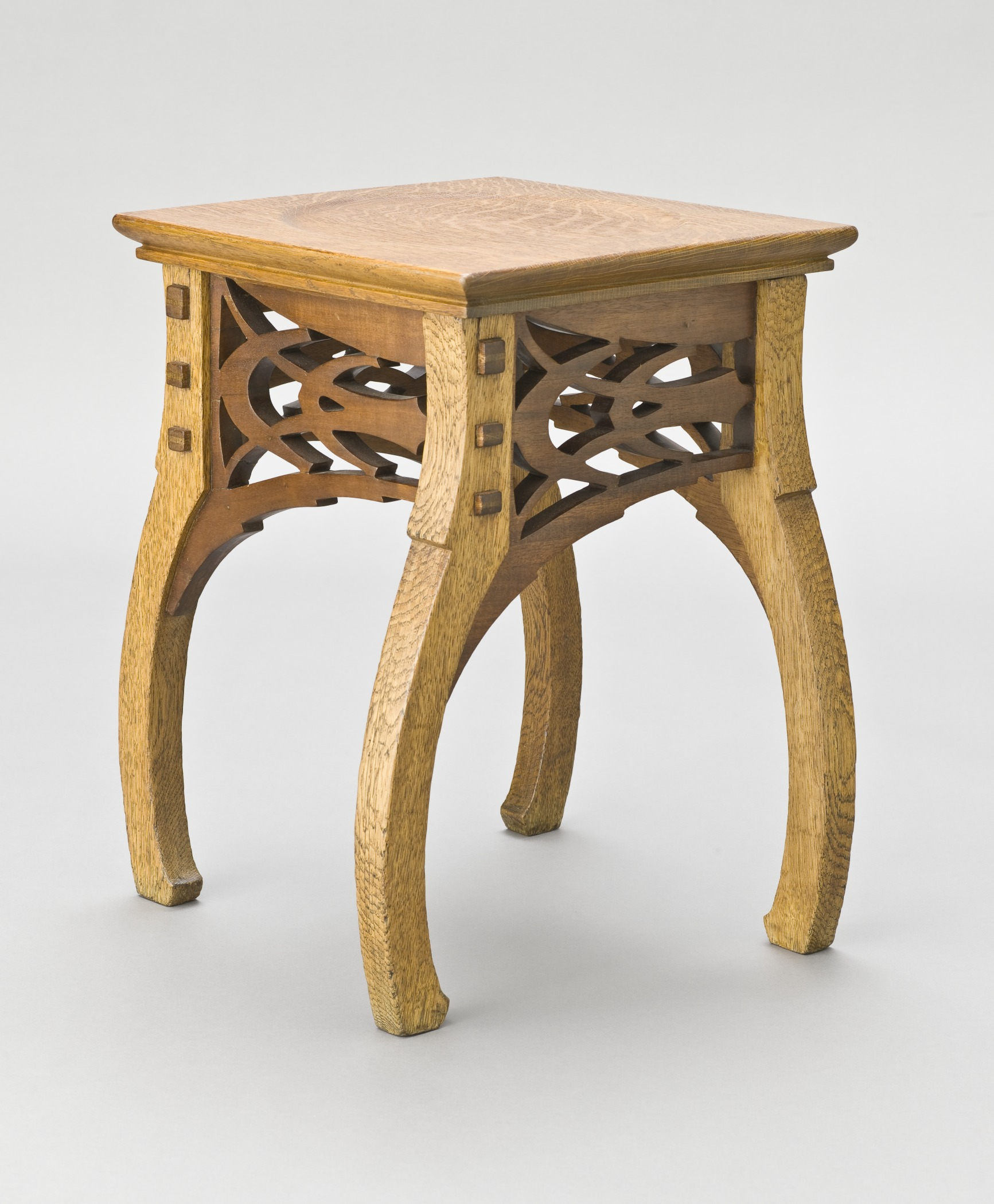
Stool, Los Angeles County Museum of Art, California (1898)

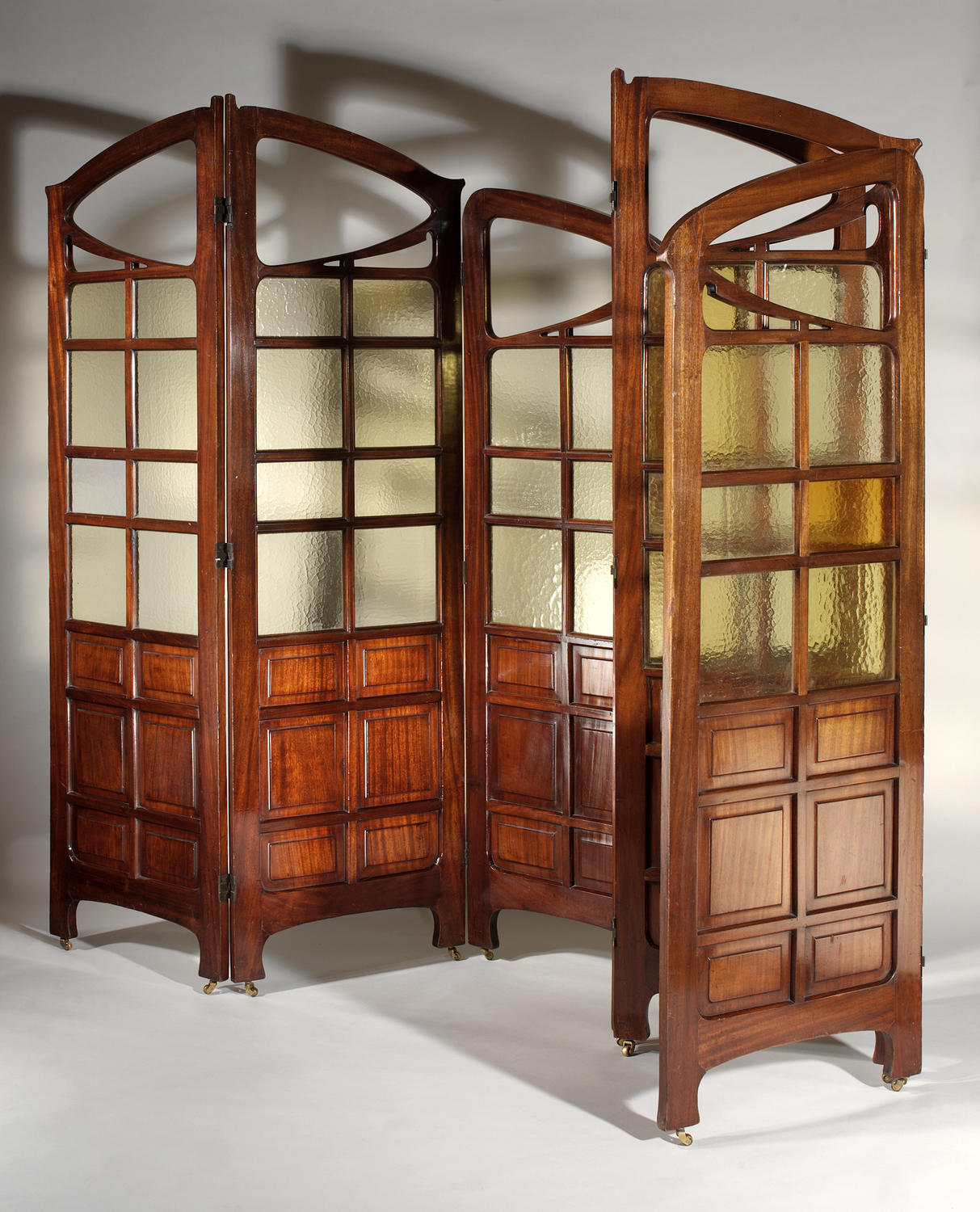
Two screens designed for the Grand Hotel. Collection King Baudouin Foundation (depot at Designmuseum Gent).

== See also ==
- Art Nouveau in Brussels
- History of Brussels
- Belgium in the long nineteenth century
