= Albert Ciamberlani =

Belgian symbolist painter

Albert Louis Alexandre Vincent Marie Ciamberlani (1864–1956) was a Belgian symbolist painter.

He was born in Brussels. He studied law, and art under i.a. Jean-François Portaels. Between 1924 and 1935 he was a professor of monumental art at the Royal Academy of Fine Arts in Antwerp. He was an enthusiastic follower of the ideas of symbolist theoretician Joséphin Péladan. His home in Brussels, Hôtel Albert Ciamberlani, is a listed building. He died in Uccle.
