= C30H48O3 =

The molecular formula C_{30}H_{48}O_{3} (molar mass: 456.70 g/mol) can represent the following compounds:

- Lucidadiol, a sterol
- Masticadienolic acid
- Oleanolic acid, a pentacyclic triterpenoid commonly found in Olea europaea (olives) and their oils
- Trametenolic acid, a triterpene
- Ursolic acid, a pentacyclic triterpenoid
