= Greek food products =

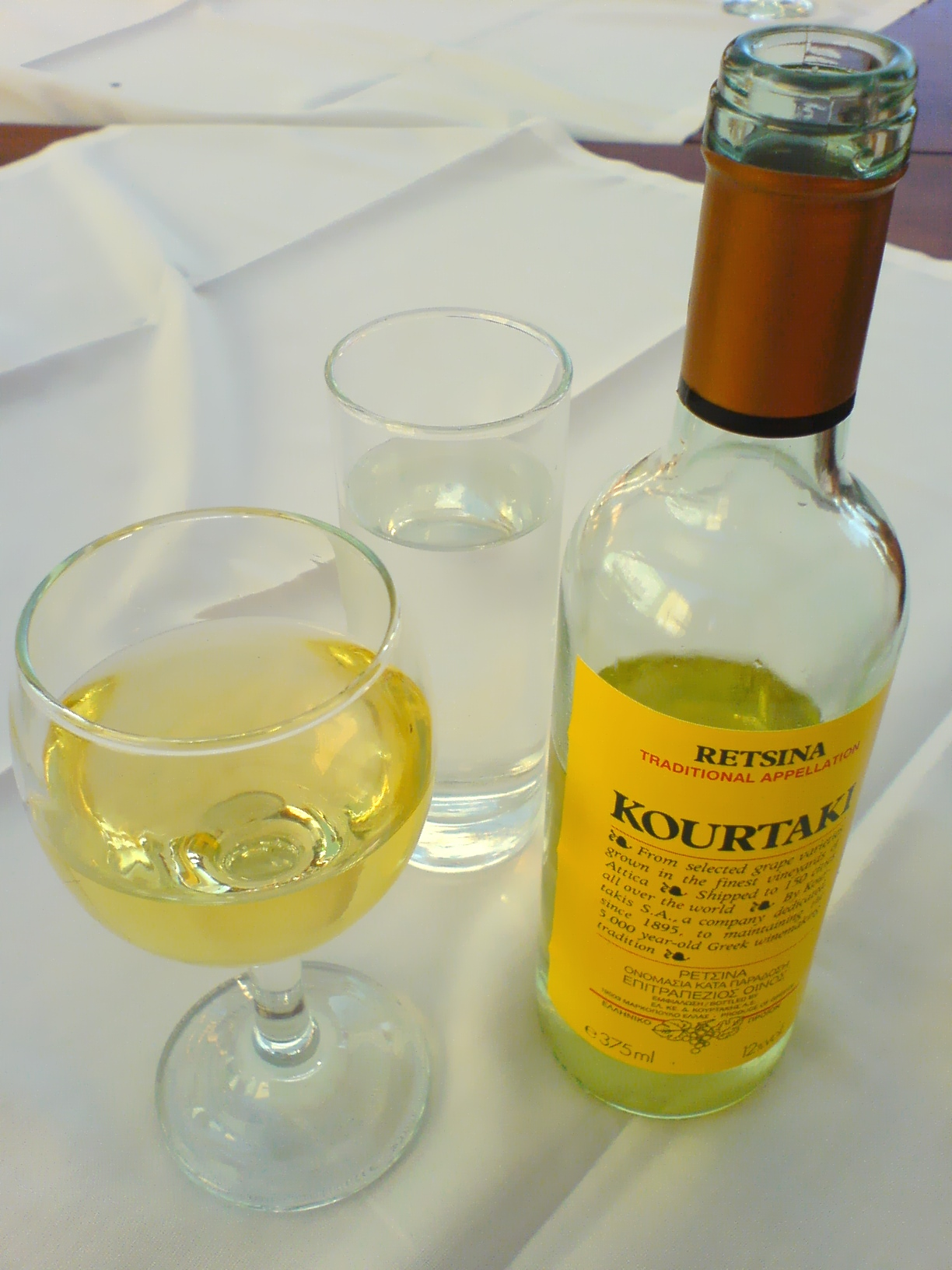
Retsina, a Greek white wine

Greece produces many food products.

== Olive oil ==
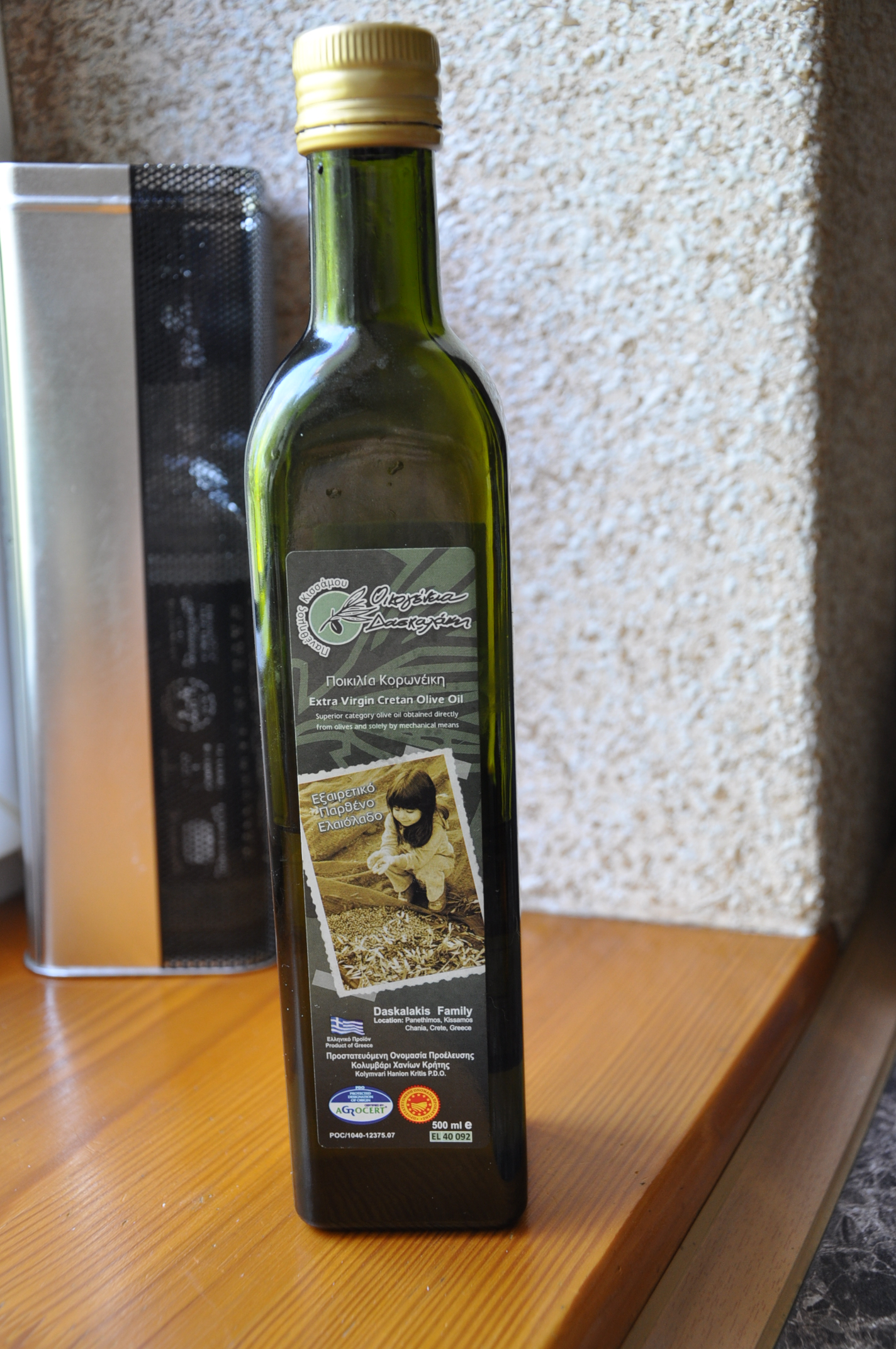
A bottle of Cretan olive oil

Greece is the world's fifth ranked producer of olive oil, producing more than 1,079,000 tons of olive oil annually, more than 75% of that extra virgin. Greek olive oil is exported throughout the world.

Olive oil plays an important role in the Greek diet, being the basis of many dishes.

== Honey ==
Honey in Greece is mainly flower-honey from the nectar of fruit and citrus trees (lemon, orange, bigarade trees), thyme honey, and pine honey from conifer trees.

== Mastic ==
Mastic is grown on the Aegean island of Chios.

== Alcoholic beverages ==
- Kitron: a liqueur from Naxos like limoncello, produced from citrons rather than lemons.
- Mastika: a liqueur from Chios seasoned with mastic, a resin gathered from the mastic tree, a small evergreen tree native to the Mediterranean.
- Ouzo: (a.c. ~ 40%) is an anise-flavored alcoholic aperitif similar to the French pastis and Turkish rakı.
- Tsikoudia: a pomace brandy from Crete, similar to tsipouro and rakı.
- Tsipouro: a pomace brandy from mainland Greece and the northern Aegean, similar to tsikoudia and rakı. May or may not be anise-flavored.

== Cheeses ==
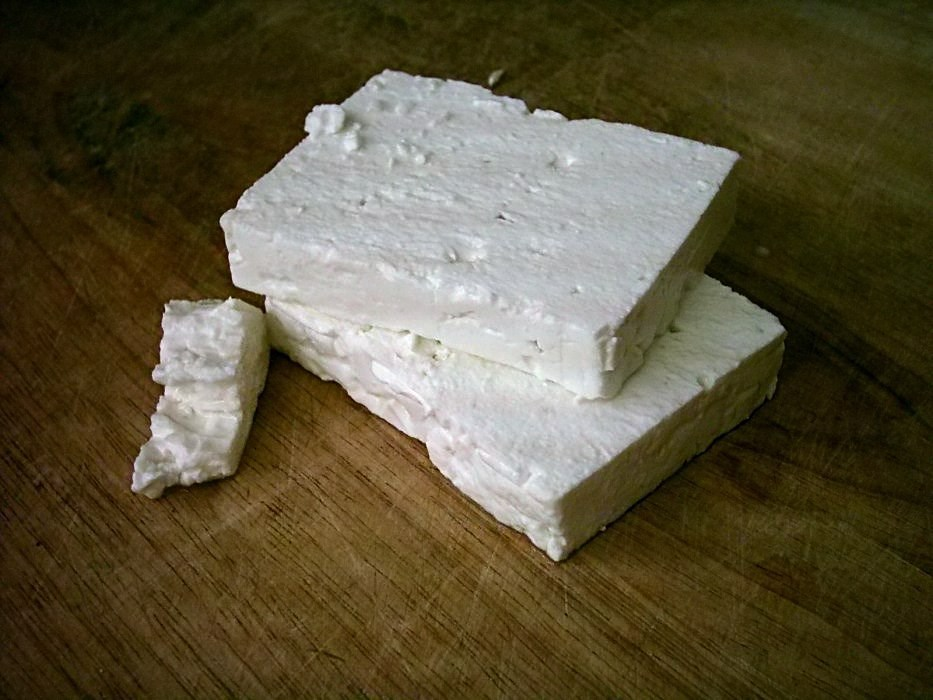
Greek feta

- Anthotyros is a hard grating cheese made by aging mizithra.
- Feta: A semi-soft, crumbly, brined white cheese made from goat or sheep milk.
- Graviera: A Greek version of Gruyere, it is served with meals or used for grating and serving with pasta.
- Kasseri: a medium hard yellow cheese made from sheep or goat milk
- Kefalotyri: A hard and very salty cheese, used mainly for grating and serving with pasta.
- Manouri: An unsalted soft white cheese served on its own or used in savoury or sweet pies.
- Metsovone: A semi-hard smoked cheese traditionally produced in Metsovo.
- Mizithra: An unsalted soft cheese made from sheep milk. Served on its own or used in sweet or savoury pies. A slightly aged, sour version is called xynomizithra.

== Cured meat ==
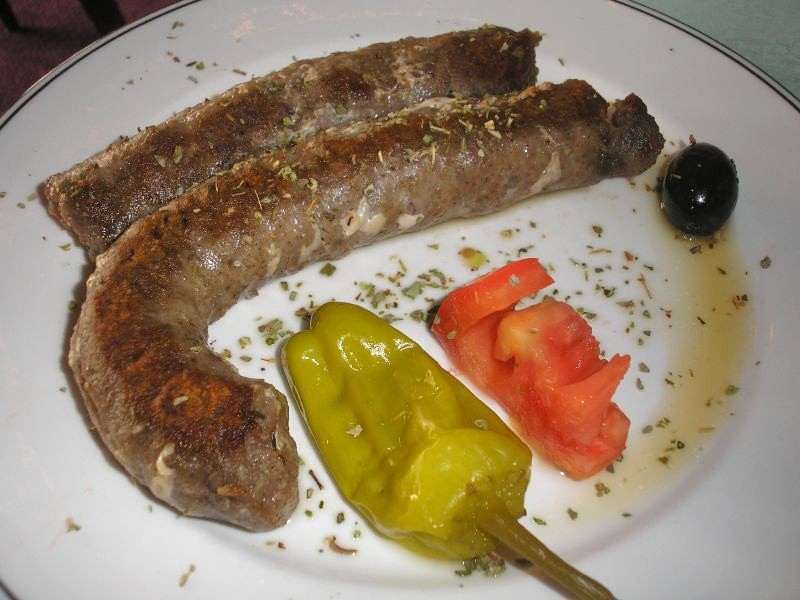
Loukaniko

- Apaki: Cured pork from Crete.
- Kavourmas: Cured meat from northern Greece.
- Loukaniko: Pork sausage flavored with orange peel or fennel seed. May differ widely across Greece.
- Louza: Cured pork from Cyclades
- Syglino: Cured ham from Mani, boiled in red wine and smoked.

== Wine ==
Greece is a heavy producer and consumer of wine.

- Mavrodafni
- Retsina
- Xynomavro
- Vin santo

== See also ==
- Economy of Greece
- Greek cuisine
- Greek restaurant
