= Masticadienonic acid =

- Skeletal formula

Names
- Preferred IUPAC name (E)-2-methyl-6-(4,4,10,13,14-pentamethyl-3-oxo-1,2,5,6,9,11,12,15,16,17-decahydrocyclopenta[a]phenanthren-17-yl)hept-2-enoic acid
- Other names (24Z)-3-oxolanosta-7,24-dien-26-oic acid

Identifiers
CAS Number	514-49-8
3D model (JSmol)	Interactive image; Interactive image
ChEBI	CHEBI:172023
ChemSpider	9514955
PubChem CID	5951616
CompTox Dashboard (EPA)	DTXSID101315065
- InChI: InChI=1S/C30H46O3/c1-19(9-8-10-20(2)26(32)33)21-13-17-30(7)23-11-12-24-27(3,4)25(31)15-16-28(24,5)22(23)14-18-29(21,30)6/h10-11,19,21-22,24H,8-9,12-18H2,1-7H3,(H,32,33)/b20-10+ Key: VOYZLKWKVLYJHD-KEBDBYFISA-N; InChI=1S/C30H46O3/c1-19(9-8-10-20(2)26(32)33)21-13-17-30(7)23-11-12-24-27(3,4)25(31)15-16-28(24,5)22(23)14-18-29(21,30)6/h10-11,19,21-22,24H,8-9,12-18H2,1-7H3,(H,32,33)/b20-10-/t19-,21-,22-,24-,28+,29-,30+/m0/s1 Key: VOYZLKWKVLYJHD-UZEUFRBSSA-N
- SMILES: CC(CC/C=C(\C)/C(=O)O)C1CCC2(C1(CCC3C2=CCC4C3(CCC(=O)C4(C)C)C)C)C; C/C(=C/CC[C@H](C)[C@@H]1CC[C@]2(C)C3=CC[C@H]4C(C)(C)C(=O)CC[C@]4(C)[C@H]3CC[C@@]12C)C(=O)O

Properties
Chemical formula	C_{30}H_{46}O_{3}
Molar mass	454.69 g/mol
Appearance	White to off-white solid
Density	~1.0 g/cm^{3} (estimated)
Solubility in water	Practically insoluble in water; soluble in ethanol, DMSO

Hazards
- Occupational safety and health (OHS/OSH)
Main hazards	Not extensively studied; handle as potentially bioactive
Flash point	Not applicable
Autoignition temperature	Not applicable
- Except where otherwise noted, data are given for materials in their standard state (at 25 °C [77 °F], 100 kPa). (what is ?) Infobox references

Masticadienonic acid is a triterpenoid compound – a natural product – derived from the resin of Pistacia lentiscus (the mastic tree), which belongs to the family of tirucallane-type tetracyclic triterpenoids based on its structural characteristics and biosynthetic origin, and has shown biological activity in scientific studies, such as anti-inflammatory properties.

== Occurrence ==
Masticadienonic acid is one of the major constituents of mastic gum, which is a natural resin exuded from the bark of Pistacia lentiscus, a plant native to the Mediterranean region, especially on the Greek island of Chios. It is typically accompanied by masticadienolic acid and other triterpenoid compounds.

== Structure and biological activity ==
This compound has a lanostane skeleton with a carboxylic acid group and a conjugated enone system. It is biosynthesized in the plant through the mevalonate pathway, which is common for all triterpenes and steroids.

Studies suggest that masticadienonic acid exhibits an extensive variety of biological activities:

- It shows anti-inflammatory properties through modulation of pro-inflammatory pathways such as NF-κB.
- It has antitumor effects in certain cancer models, including prostate cancer, through induction of apoptosis.
- It can inhibit enzymes related to steroid metabolism, such as 11β-hydroxysteroid dehydrogenase, although this effect is still under further investigation.

== Applications ==
Because of its natural origin and bioactive potential, masticadienonic acid is of high interest in: nutraceutical development, traditional herbal medicine research, and also, drug discovery as a scaffold for semi-synthetic derivatives.
