= C30H46O3 =

The molecular formula C_{30}H_{46}O_{3} (molar mass: 454.68 g/mol, exact mass: 454.3447 u) may refer to:

- Masticadienonic acid
- Moronic acid
- Testosterone buciclate
- Testosterone undecylenate (TUe)
