= Molara Island =

Island

Molara
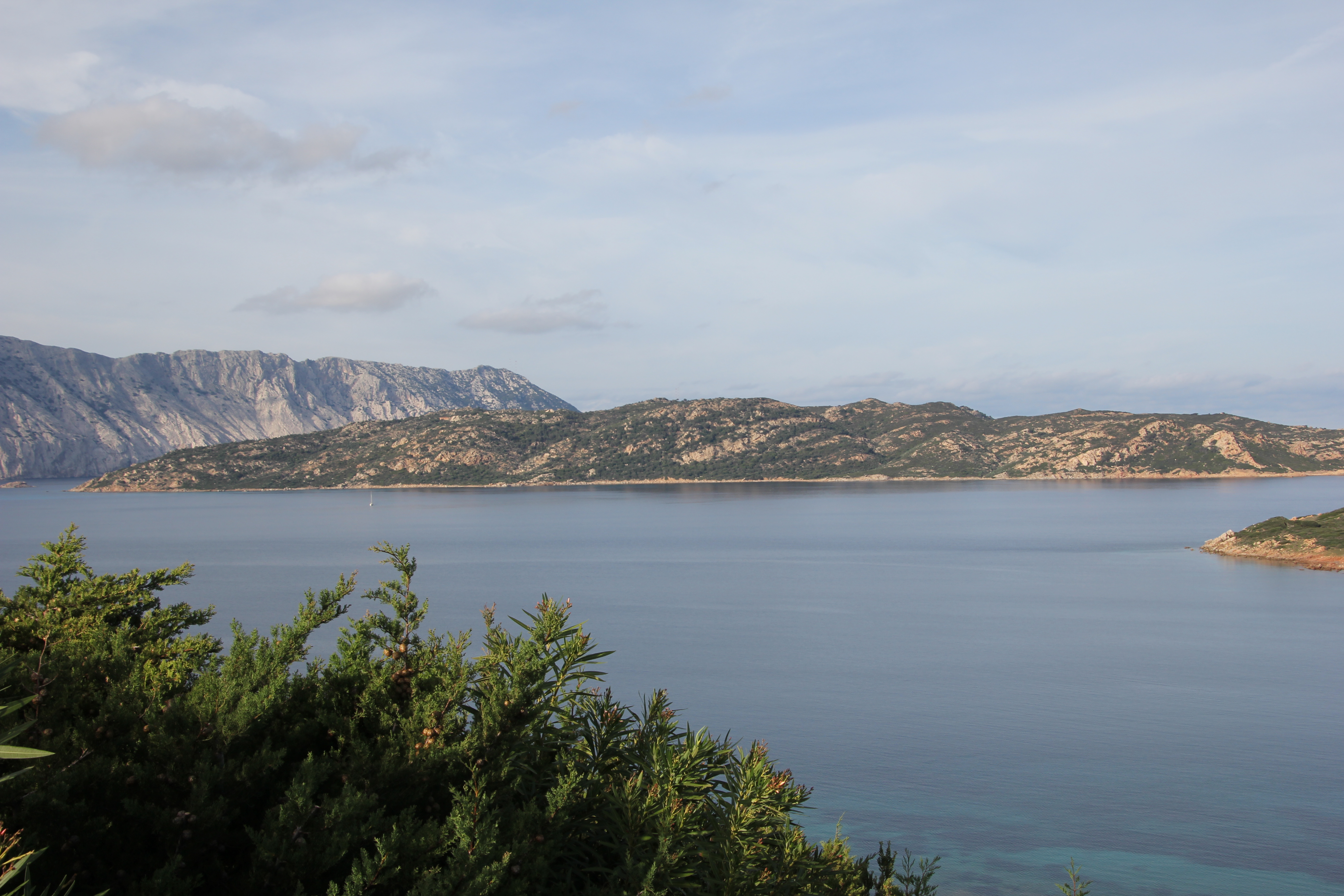
- Interactive map of Molara
- Etymology: From mola, millstone in Italian

Geography
- Location: Tavolara, Italy
- Coordinates: 40°52′09″N 9°43′39″E
- Area: 3,411 km^{2} (1,317 sq mi)
- Highest elevation: 158 m (518 ft)
- Highest point: Punta la Guardia

Administration
- Italy
- Region: Sardinia
- Province: Sassari
- Communes: Olbia

Demographics
- Population: 0

Molara is an island in north-eastern Sardinia and constitutes, together with the island of Tavolara, Molarotto, the peninsula of Punta Coda Cavallo and other minor rocks, a protected marine park. Of a granite nature, it has an area of 3,411 km^{2} and reaches, with Punta la Guardia, 158 m u.s.l. Its name, of medieval origin, is probably due to the rounded and uniform shape of the island, similar to a millstone (in Italian, mola).

== History ==
So far no documented prehistoric settlements appear on the island of Molara but at the dawn of Christianity it is said that Pope Pontian (235) was exiled there together with the priest Ippolito (while the historian and humanist G. F. Fara in the 16th century indicated the island of Tavolara). In the north-western part of the island, near cala Chiesa, there are the remains of a single-nave medieval church, in Romanesque style dedicated to Saint Pontian. The church, whose original title is not known, is very similar to other Gallura buildings of this type such as the church of San Leonardo di Balaiana, near Luogosanto, in internal Gallura. Around this church it has been possible to identify the remains of a medieval inhabited center and further upstream of a castle, probably the ancient Gurguray even if there is no certain information on its effective demographic consistency. In the 15th century the existence on the island of a monastery of nuns is documented.

== Environment and tourism ==
Although the island is very rocky and impervious, there are various perennial springs and perhaps due to this abundance of water man has been able to live there for centuries. The vegetation cover of Molara is made up of very rich Maquis shrubland vegetation, with centuries-old olive trees, mastic trees and cistus, degraded in some stretches due to a vast fire that burned the southern part of the island in the 70s. There is wild livestock (cows and goats), abandoned by the previous property. To the east of cala di Chiesa stands the rock of the dinosaur, a bizarre natural sculpture shaped by the winds and the sea. On the south coast are the ruins of a lime kiln, produced in the past from the limestone of nearby Tavolara, by burning wood from Molara.

Numerous species of seabirds nest on the island, such as the peregrine falcon and the rare Audouin's gull. Even the Manx shearwater is present with hundreds of pairs, unable to reproduce annually due to an immense population of rats.

The island is privately owned and cannot be visited.
