= Bouyiourdi =

Greek dish

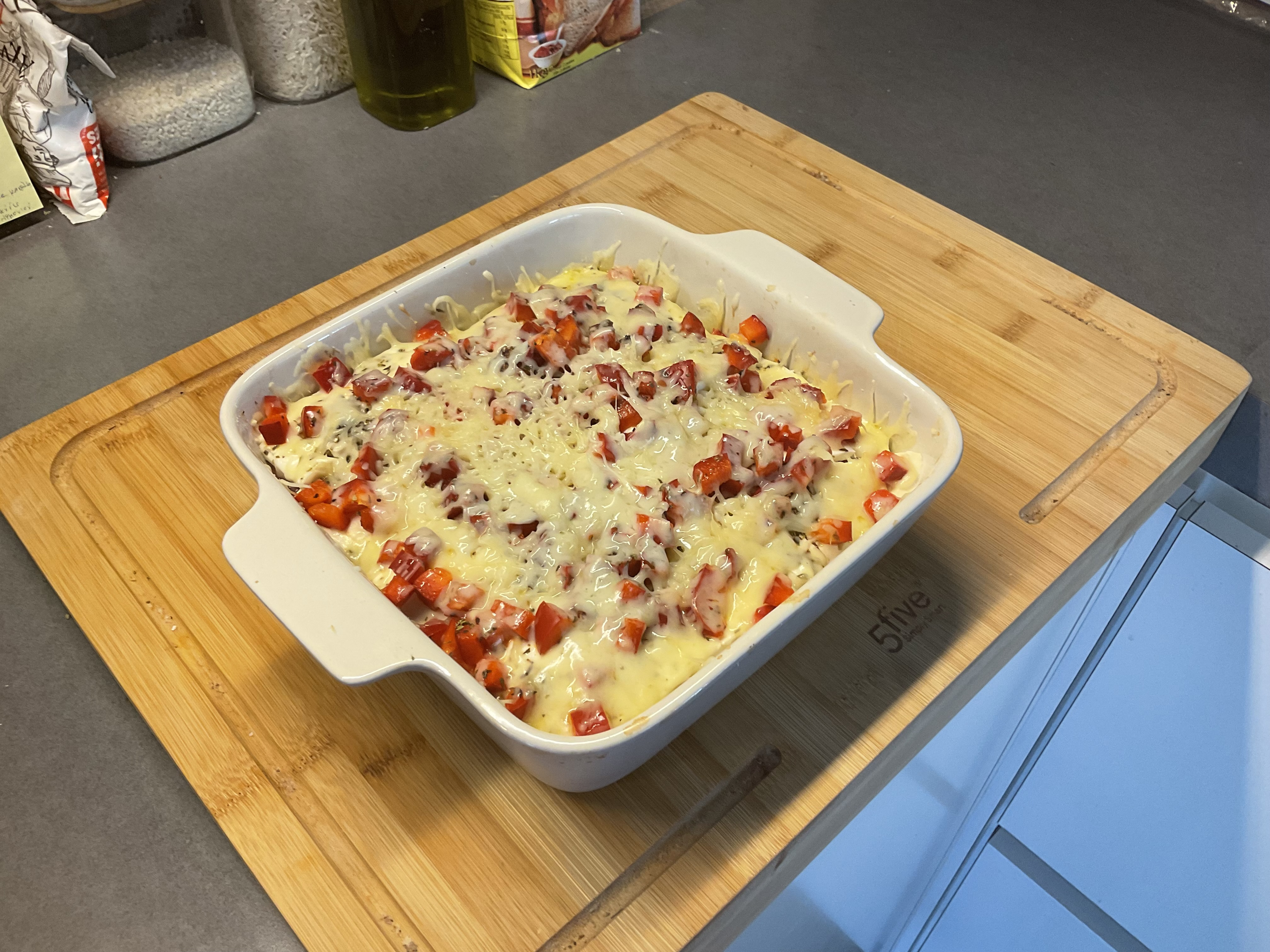
- Thessalonikian bouyiourdi made in a clay fireproof pan. The recipe consists of feta cheese, yellow cheese, tomatoes, bell pepper, chili pepper, olive oil, oregano, and ground pepper.
- Course: Appetizer
- Place of origin: Greece
- Region or state: Greece
- Serving temperature: Hot
- Main ingredients: Feta, tomatoes, peppers
- Ingredients generally used: Oregano, olive oil, hot pepper flakes
- Variations: Kasseri, onions, garlic

Bouyiourdi (Greek: Μπουγιουρντί) or bouyourdi is a Greek meze.

The dish originated in Thessaloniki and according to America's Test Kitchen is "essentially Thessalonian". It consists of feta, tomatoes, peppers, oregano, olive oil and typically Bukovo crushed red pepper, and sometimes additional ingredients such as shredded kasseri, onions, and garlic.

The ingredients are typically layered into an earthenware baking dish and baked; various recipes call for the baking to be done covered or uncovered.

It is a common dish in tavernas. It can be served with pita or other breads. Etymologically, μπουγιουρντί ("bouyiourdi," 'spicy baked feta') derives from the Turkish word "buyurdu" (meaning 'ordered').
