= Megilp =

Oil-painting medium

Megilp (/məˈɡɪlp/), also known as Macgilp or McGuilpis, is an oil painting medium consisting of a mixture of mastic varnish and an oil medium: such as walnut, linseed, safflower, poppy, or black oil (linseed oil) cooked with litharge or white lead. Earlier recipes may omit the mastic and substitute wax.

It makes oil paint thin, glossy and easy to work, with an extremely short drying time; and depending on the formulation, the modern, premixed glazes may help produce the sensation of depth, and help the painter by producing transparency that will hold in place rather than running or sagging, while at the same time sidestepping many of the traditional problems associated with Megilp, seeing how the archival quality of the older recipes is much disputed. Some claim the traditional, hand mixed medium causes paint to become yellow and brittle, while others claim that improperly prepared paint is the cause and that the longevity of Megilp (especially in its premixed glazing form) is excellent.

Victoria Finlay cites Joshua Reynolds as an example of a painter whose reliance on Megilp has detracted from the longevity of his paintings. Specifically, she indicates his painting Girl With a Baby as one which has changed a great deal over time. Megilp was also used by Turner.
