= Masticadienolic acid =

- Skeletal formula

Names
- Preferred IUPAC name (Z,6S)-6-[(3S,5R,9R,10R,13S,14S,17S)-3-hydroxy-4,4,10,13,14-pentamethyl-2,3,5,6,9,11,12,15,16,17-decahydro-1H-cyclopenta[a]phenanthren-17-yl]-2-methylhept-2-enoic acid

Identifiers
CAS Number	472-30-0
3D model (JSmol)	Interactive image
ChEMBL	ChEMBL5266227
ChemSpider	28425558
PubChem CID	102004474
- InChI: InChI=1S/C30H48O3/c1-19(9-8-10-20(2)26(32)33)21-13-17-30(7)23-11-12-24-27(3,4)25(31)15-16-28(24,5)22(23)14-18-29(21,30)6/h10-11,19,21-22,24-25,31H,8-9,12-18H2,1-7H3,(H,32,33)/b20-10-/t19-,21-,22-,24-,25-,28+,29-,30+/m0/s1 Key: UILQHUKSFUOOLH-MCGHDPRASA-N
- SMILES: C[C@@H](CC/C=C(/C)\C(=O)O)[C@@H]1CC[C@]2([C@]1(CC[C@H]3C2=CC[C@@H]4[C@@]3(CC[C@@H](C4(C)C)O)C)C)C

Properties
Chemical formula	C_{30}H_{48}O_{3}
Molar mass	456.71 g/mol
Appearance	White to off-white solid
Density	~1.0 g/cm^{3} (estimated)
Solubility in water	Practically insoluble in water; soluble in ethanol, DMSO

Hazards
- Occupational safety and health (OHS/OSH)
Main hazards	Not extensively studied; handle as potentially bioactive
Flash point	Not applicable
Autoignition temperature	Not applicable
- Except where otherwise noted, data are given for materials in their standard state (at 25 °C [77 °F], 100 kPa). (what is ?) Infobox references

Masticadienolic acid is a naturally occurring terpenoid compound found in the resin of the mastic tree (Pistacia lentiscus), particularly in the variety cultivated on the Greek island of Chios. Chemically, it is a tirucallane-type tetracyclic triterpenoid based on its structural characteristics and biosynthetic origin. It is structurally related strongly to masticadienonic acid, differing by the presence of a hydroxyl group, which may influence its biological activity.

== Occurrence ==
Masticadienolic acid is one of the major constituents of mastic gum, a natural resin exuded from the bark of Pistacia lentiscus. The resin has been used for its medicinal properties.

== Structure and biological activity ==
This natural product contains a lanostane-type skeleton with a carboxylic acid group and also a hydroxyl group. It is actually a pentacyclic triterpenoid, and it is biosynthesized via the mevalonate pathway in the plants.

Research indicates that masticadienolic acid exhibits several biological activities, such as anti-inflammatory properties, and antioxidant effects against oxidative stress.
