= Ouzini =

Mixed drink using only ingredients from Cyprus

- Type: Cocktail
- Ingredients: 2.5 cl (one part) Cyprus ouzo; 7.5 cl (three parts) fresh orange juice; 2.5 cl (one part) fresh lemon juice; 2-4 drops of bitters
- Base spirit: Ouzo
- Standard drinkware: Highball glass
- Served: On the rocks: poured over ice
- Preparation: Shake ouzo and fresh juices vigorously together, coat the rim of a glass with powdered sugar and pour drink into glass over ice, and add dash of bitters. Garnish with a thin orange slice and serve.

The ouzini is a mixed alcoholic cocktail invented by the novelist Michael Paraskos as an alternative national drink of Cyprus to the ubiquitous brandy sour.

Using only native Cypriot ingredients, including Cypriot ouzo, the drink was invented in response to a campaign launched in 2014 by the Cyprus Tourism Organisation to encourage restaurants in Cyprus to offer customers Cypriot cuisine. According to Paraskos the drink tastes "like liquid aniseed balls", referring to the traditional boiled sweet, and is "ideal for a hot Cypriot evening before dinner."

The drink is featured heavily in Michael Paraskos's novel In Search of Sixpence.

== See also ==
- List of cocktails
