= Inotodiol =

Names
- IUPAC name (22R)-Lanosta-8,24-diene-3β,22-diol
- Systematic IUPAC name (1R,3aR,5aR,7S,9aS,11aR)-1-[(2S,3R)-3-Hydroxy-6-methylhept-5-en-2-yl]-3a,6,6,9a,11a-pentamethyl-2,3,3a,4,5,5a,6,7,8,9,9a,10,11,11a-tetradecahydro-1H-cyclopenta[a]phenanthren-7-ol

Identifiers
CAS Number	35963-37-2
3D model (JSmol)	Interactive image
ChEBI	CHEBI:199329
ChEMBL	ChEMBL449088
ChemSpider	23282401
PubChem CID	44422314
CompTox Dashboard (EPA)	DTXSID10957379
- InChI: InChI=1S/C30H50O2/c1-19(2)9-11-24(31)20(3)21-13-17-30(8)23-10-12-25-27(4,5)26(32)15-16-28(25,6)22(23)14-18-29(21,30)7/h9,20-21,24-26,31-32H,10-18H2,1-8H3/t20-,21+,24+,25-,26-,28+,29+,30-/m0/s1 Key: KKWJCGCIAHLFNE-KFPHZHIMSA-N; InChI=1/C30H50O2/c1-19(2)9-11-24(31)20(3)21-13-17-30(8)23-10-12-25-27(4,5)26(32)15-16-28(25,6)22(23)14-18-29(21,30)7/h9,20-21,24-26,31-32H,10-18H2,1-8H3/t20-,21+,24+,25-,26-,28+,29+,30-/m0/s1 Key: KKWJCGCIAHLFNE-KFPHZHIMBI
- SMILES: C[C@@H]([C@H]1CC[C@@]2([C@@]1(CCC3=C2CC[C@@H]4[C@@]3(CC[C@@H](C4(C)C)O)C)C)C)[C@@H](CC=C(C)C)O

Properties
Chemical formula	C_{30}H_{50}O_{2}
Molar mass	442.717
- Except where otherwise noted, data are given for materials in their standard state (at 25 °C [77 °F], 100 kPa). Infobox references

Inotodiol is an anti-inflammatory sterol isolated from Inonotus obliquus.
