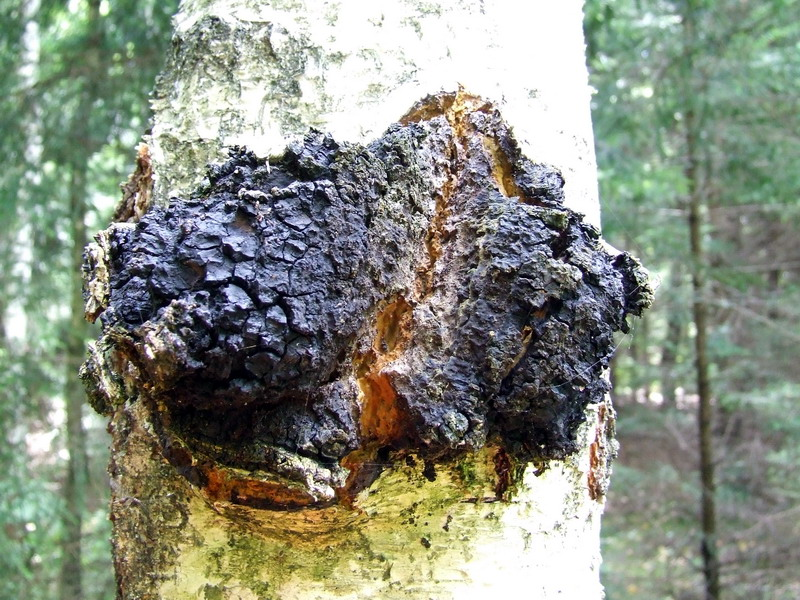

Conservation status
- Least Concern (IUCN 3.1)

Scientific classification
- Kingdom: Fungi
- Division: Basidiomycota
- Class: Agaricomycetes
- Order: Hymenochaetales
- Family: Hymenochaetaceae
- Genus: Inonotus
- Species: I. obliquus

Binomial name
- Inonotus obliquus (Ach. ex Pers.) Pilát (1942)

Synonyms
- Boletus obliquus Ach. ex Pers. (1801); Polyporus obliquus (Ach. ex Pers.) Fr. (1821); Physisporus obliquus (Ach. ex Pers.) Chevall. (1826); Poria obliqua (Ach. ex Pers.) P.Karst. (1881); Fomes obliquus (Ach. ex Pers.) Cooke (1885); Phaeoporus obliquus (Ach. ex Pers.) J.Schröt. (1888); Mucronoporus obliqua (Ach. ex Pers.) Ellis & Everh. (1889); Scindalma obliquum (Ach. ex Pers.) Kuntze (1898); Phellinus obliquus (Ach. ex Pers.) Pat. (1900); Xanthochrous obliquus (Ach. ex Pers.) Bourdot & Galzin (1928); Fuscoporia obliqua (Ach. ex Pers.) Aoshima (1951)

= Inonotus obliquus =

Species of fungus

Inonotus obliquus, commonly called chaga (/ˈtʃɑːɡə/; a Latinization of the Russian word ча́га), is a fungus in the family Hymenochaetaceae. It is parasitic on birch and other trees. The sterile conk is irregularly formed and resembles burnt charcoal. It is not the fruiting body of the fungus, but a sclerotium or mass of mycelium, mostly black because of a substantial amount of melanin. It is commonly marketed as a dietary supplement for various health benefits but lacks sufficient scientific evidence for safety or effectiveness, and quality can vary due to inconsistent processing and labeling.

== Description ==
Inonotus obliquus causes a white heart rot to develop in the host tree. The chaga spores enter the tree through wounds, particularly poorly healed branch stubs. The white rot decay will spread throughout the heartwood of the host. During the infection cycle, penetration of the sapwood occurs only around the sterile exterior mycelium mass. The chaga fungus will continue to cause decay within the living tree for 10–80+ years. While the tree is alive, only sterile mycelial masses are produced (the black exterior conk). The sexual stage begins after the tree, or some portion of the tree, is killed by the infection. I. obliquus will begin to produce fertile fruiting bodies underneath the bark. These bodies begin as a whitish mass that turn to brown with time. Since the sexual stage occurs almost entirely under the bark, the fruiting body is rarely seen. These fruiting bodies produce basidiospores which will spread the infection to other vulnerable trees.

The mycelial canker is about 10–25 centimetres (4–10 in) wide, while the underlying crust can be 5–50 cm (2–19 1/2 in) long.

=== Chemistry ===
The fungus is principally noted for high-molecular-weight polysaccharidesm, chiefly β-D-glucans and heteropolysaccharides, together with a distinctive lanostane-type triterpenoid fraction comprising betulin, betulinic acid, lanosterol, lupeol, inonotusols, inotodiol, trametenolic acid, inonotusoxides, spirononotusoxodiol and the inoterpens. Phenolic constituents include vanillic acid, protocatechuic acid, syringic acid, caffeic acid, phelligridin D, 3,4-dihydroxybenzalacetone and inonolin B, accompanied by the flavonoids quercetin, rutin and kaempferol.

The black sclerotium has large concentrations of melanin. Chaga contains extremely high concentrations of oxalate, 2800–11200 mg total oxalates/100 g sclerotium, one of the highest reported in any organism.

=== Similar species ===
Similar species include Apiosporina morbosa, Diplodia tumefaciens, and Echinodontium tinctorium, as well as species of Fulvifomes and Fomitiporia.

== Distribution and habitat ==
Inonotus obliquus is found most commonly in the Circumboreal Region of the Northern Hemisphere, where it is distributed in birch forests.

Generally found growing on birch (Betula spp.) trees, it has also been found on alder (Alnus spp.), beech (Fagus spp.) and poplar (Populus spp.).

== Cultivation ==
Attempts at cultivating this fungus on potato dextrose agar and other simulated media resulted in a reduced and markedly different production of metabolites. Cultivated chaga developed a reduced number of phytosterols, particularly lanosterol, an intermediate in the synthesis of ergosterol and lanostane-type triterpenes.

== Uses ==
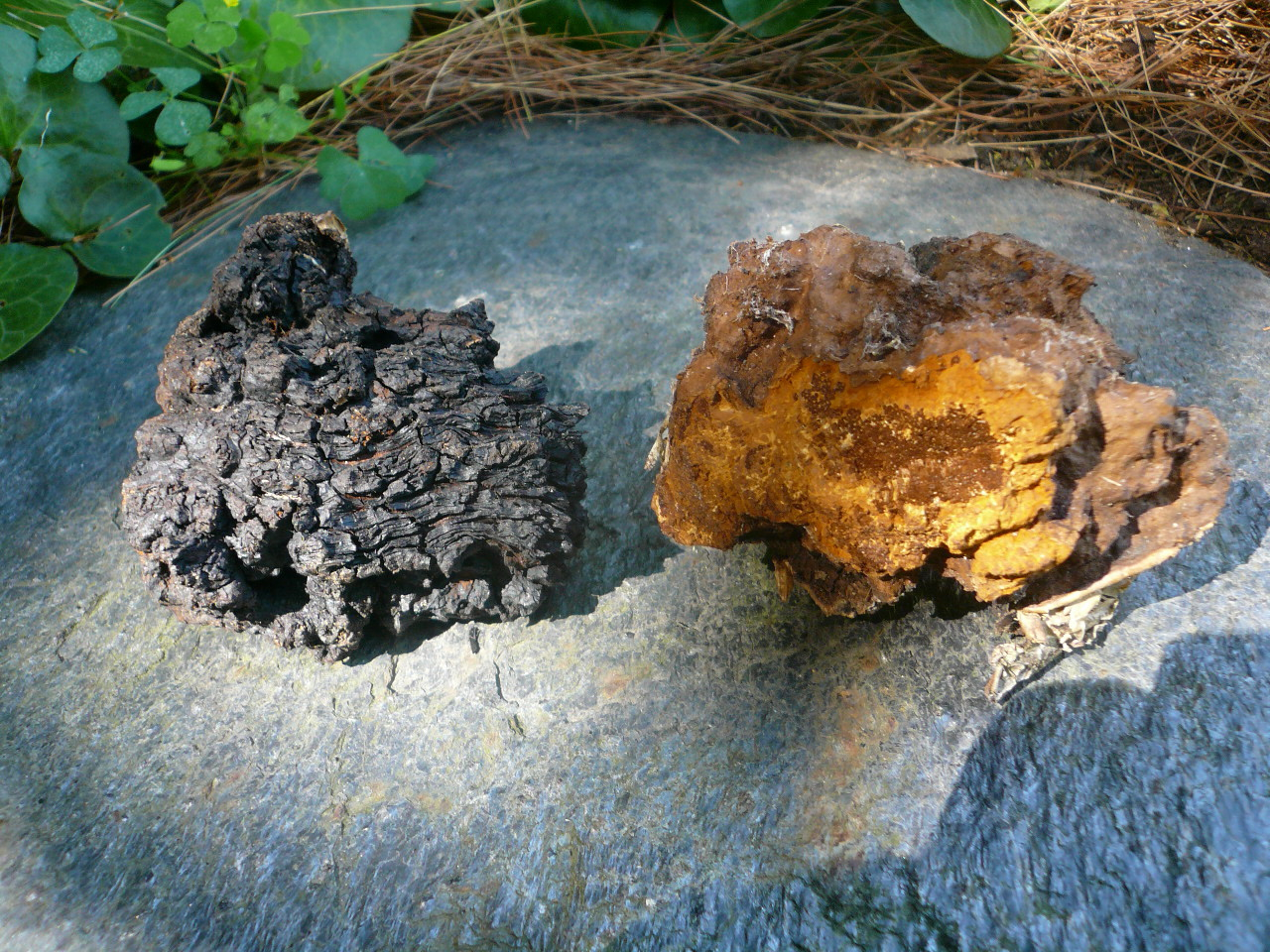
Chaga chunks

Inonotus obliquus
- Mycological characteristics
- Smooth hymenium
- No distinct cap
- Hymenium attachment is not applicable
- Lacks a stipe
- Ecology is parasitic
- Edibility is choice

It is commonly marketed as a dietary supplement for various health benefits but lacks sufficient scientific evidence for safety or effectiveness, and quality can vary due to inconsistent processing and labeling.

Chaga is traditionally grated into a fine powder and used to brew a beverage resembling coffee or tea which tastes strongly of Chinese herbal tea. However, caution is warranted with chronic use due to the extremely high concentrations of oxalates in chaga.

Hot water extraction is a common preparation. A decoction is created by simmering blocklike pieces of the chaga in numerous quarts of water until the water is reduced and the remaining liquid contains a portion of the chaga's concentrated water-soluble compounds. Such preparations, produced in China and Japan, are exported worldwide. The β-D-glucans may have a content of approximately 35% in a pure extract. If chaga tea is prepared at home, the chaga chunks can be reused multiple times.

Potawatomi people use the fungus, called shkitagen in their language, as a firekeeping tinder. According to Potawatomi biologist Robin Wall Kimmerer, "Once an ember meets shkitagen it will not go out but smolders slowly in the fungal matrix, holding its heat. Even the smallest spark, so fleeting and easily lost, will be held and nurtured if it lands on a cube of shkitagen."

== Common names ==
The name chaga comes from the Russian name of the fungus, ча́га, čága, which in turn is borrowed from the word for "mushroom" in Komi, тшак, tšak, the language of the indigenous peoples in the Kama River Basin, west of the Ural Mountains. It is also known as the clinker polypore, cinder conk, black mass and birch canker polypore. In England and officially in Canada, it is known as the sterile conk trunk rot of birch.

== See also ==
- Herbalism
- Medicinal fungi
