= Mastika =

Mastic-seasoned liqueur

Chios Mastiha Liqueur
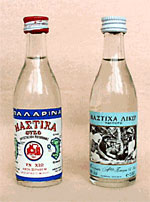
- Chios Mastiha Ouzo (left) and Mastiha Liqueur (right)
- Type: Liqueur
- Origin: Chios, Greece
- Alcohol by volume: >15% or 47%
- Colour: Transparent crystal clear to yellowish
- Flavour: Mastic
- Ingredients: Water, alcohol, sugar, mastic

Mastika (/mæˈstiːkə/ ma-STEE-kə) or mastiha is a liqueur seasoned with mastic, a resin with a slightly pine or cedar-like flavor gathered from the mastic tree, a small evergreen tree native to the Mediterranean region. In Greece, mastiha (Greek: μαστίχα) or mastichato (Greek: μαστιχάτο) is a sweet liqueur produced with the mastika resin from the island of Chios, which is distilled after hardening to crystals. Sugar is typically added. It is a sweet liqueur that is typically consumed at the end of a meal. It has a distinctive flavor, reminiscent of pine and herbs. It is claimed to have medicinal properties and to aid digestion.

In August 2012, wildfires spread across the island of Chios, scorching 12,740 hectares (31,480 acres) and destroying more than half of the island's mastic orchards. Because the product has a "protected designation of origin" from the European Union, the fire not only impacted local Chios farmers, who lost approximately 60 percent of their crops, but also derailed the global supply of the product.

== Chios Mastiha ==
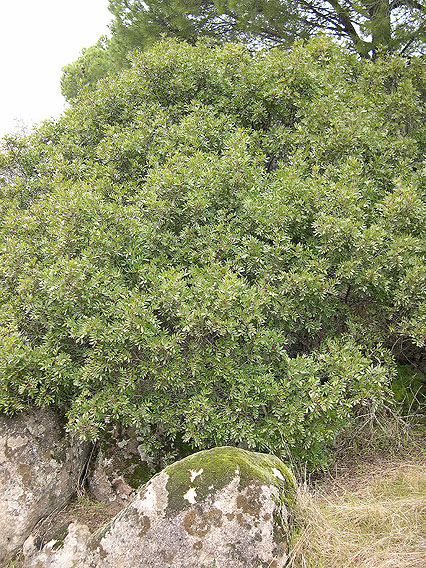
Mastic shrub—Pistacia lentiscus

Chios Mastiha Liqueur (Greek: Μαστίχα Χίου, pronounced [masˈtixa ˈçi.u]) is a liqueur flavoured with mastic distillate or mastic oil from the island of Chios. The name Chios Mastiha has protected designation of origin status in the European Union. Chios Mastiha liqueur is clear with a sweet aroma. It is traditionally served cold.

== Production ==
The process is regulated by Greek law and includes the flavouring of alcohol with mastic oil by agitation or the distillation of mastic with alcohol. The solution is then diluted with water and sweetened with sugar. The final alcoholic strength by volume of Chios Mastiha must be at least 15%.

=== Flavouring ===
The only flavouring agents used in Chios Mastiha liqueur are an alcoholic distillate of mastic or mastic oil made from Chios mastic. Mastic is the hardened sap harvested from the mastic tree, Pistacia lentiscus var chia, a small evergreen shrub that grows on rocky terrain on the southern part of the island. Chios mastic is certified by the Agricultural Products Certification and Supervision Organization as part of the Hellenic Ministry of Rural Development and Food. The island's mastic production is controlled by a co-operative of medieval villages, the Mastichochoria.

== Producers and distributors ==
=== Chios ===
- The Growers' Spirit is a producing company run by the Chios Gum Mastic Growers Association (CGMGA). The CGMGA offers Mastiha liqueur made with both mastic distillate and mastic oil in two different variants: Kentos (20% alcohol) and Enosis (30% alcohol).
- Stoupakis Chios Distillery produces Homeric Mastiha, which contains mastic distillate.
- Tetteris Distillery is one of the oldest producers of mastiha liqueur. Tetteris traditional distillery was founded in 1912. Before the company foundation, Stylianos Tetteris was producing and selling ouzo infused with mastic, for exportation. In 1954, Eleftherios Tetteris, seeing the tendency of the consumer public towards local liqueurs, and having studied oenology in France, was the first to experiment in the production of Mastic liqueur by distilling grains in a special way, and developed a special method (that only the Tetteri distillery knows and uses until today), taking natural distillate, and then with the addition of alcohol and sugar, produced the Mastic liqueur.
- KLEOS Mastiha Spirit is double distilled, small batch and low in sugar.

=== Wider Greece ===
- Skinos, based in Athens.
- Finest Roots, based in Kalamata, produces Roots Mastic and Roots Mastic Vintage Strength.
- Mavrakis, based in Patra.
- D'ARGO Distillery, based in Athens, produces CHANDOLIA Mastic Liqueur by 100% Distillate.

=== United States ===
- Mastrogiannis Mastiha
- Ambrosia Group, based in Miami, produces FOS Greek Mastiha.
- YA Mastiha

== History ==
Mastic has been harvested for at least 2,500 years since Greek antiquity. The first mention of actual mastic 'tears' was by Hippocrates. Hippocrates used mastic for the prevention of digestive problems, colds and as a breath freshener. Roman emperors used mastic along with honey, pepper, and egg in the spiced wine conditum paradoxum. Digestive liqueurs, similar to Mastiha but made with grapes, were known as the Greek elixirs before the French Revolution.

== Influence in literature ==
Greek writer and journalist Zoe Rapti released a novel titled Έρωτας με Λικέρ Μαστίχα (Love with Mastic Liqueur) in 2013. The book is in development to become a film.

== See also ==
- Greek cuisine
- Greek food products
