= Mastic tree =

Mastic tree is a common name for several plants:

- Pistacia lentiscus (Anacardiaceae) – mastic – Mediterranean region. Source of mastic gum.
- Sideroxylon foetidissimum (Sapotaceae) – yellow mastic or false mastic – Caribbean region and Central America
- Terminalia eriostachya (Combretaceae) – black mastic – Cuba and Cayman Islands
