= Lucidadiol =

Names
- IUPAC name (24E)-3β,26-Dihydroxylanosta-8,24-dien-7-one
- Systematic IUPAC name (1R,3aR,5aR,7S,9aS,11aR)-7-Hydroxy-1-[(2E,5E)-7-hydroxy-6-methylhept-5-en-2-yl]-3a,6,6,9a,11a-pentamethyl-1,2,3,3a,5,5a,6,7,8,9,9a,10,11,11a-tetradecahydro-4H-cyclopenta[a]phenanthren-4-one

Identifiers
| CAS Number | 252351-95-4 |
| 3D model (JSmol) | Interactive image |
| ChEMBL | ChEMBL1915764 |
| ChemSpider | 8965303 |
| PubChem CID | 10789991 |
| UNII | ANY54A9QKX |
| CompTox Dashboard (EPA) | DTXSID501045682 |
- InChI: InChI=1S/C30H48O3/c1-19(18-31)9-8-10-20(2)21-11-16-30(7)26-22(12-15-29(21,30)6)28(5)14-13-25(33)27(3,4)24(28)17-23(26)32/h9,20-21,24-25,31,33H,8,10-18H2,1-7H3/b19-9+/t20-,21-,24+,25+,28-,29-,30+/m1/s1 Key: AZPOACUDFJKUHJ-GPEQXWBKSA-N; InChI=1/C30H48O3/c1-19(18-31)9-8-10-20(2)21-11-16-30(7)26-22(12-15-29(21,30)6)28(5)14-13-25(33)27(3,4)24(28)17-23(26)32/h9,20-21,24-25,31,33H,8,10-18H2,1-7H3/b19-9+/t20-,21-,24+,25+,28-,29-,30+/m1/s1 Key: AZPOACUDFJKUHJ-GPEQXWBKBK
- SMILES: C[C@H](CC/C=C(\C)/CO)[C@H]1CC[C@@]2([C@@]1(CCC3=C2C(=O)C[C@@H]4[C@@]3(CC[C@@H](C4(C)C)O)C)C)C

Properties
| Chemical formula | C_{30}H_{48}O_{3} |
| Molar mass | 456.711 g·mol^{−1} |
- Except where otherwise noted, data are given for materials in their standard state (at 25 °C [77 °F], 100 kPa). Infobox references

Lucidadiol is a bio-active sterol isolated from Ganoderma.
