= Kasseri =

Greek sheep and goat milk cheese

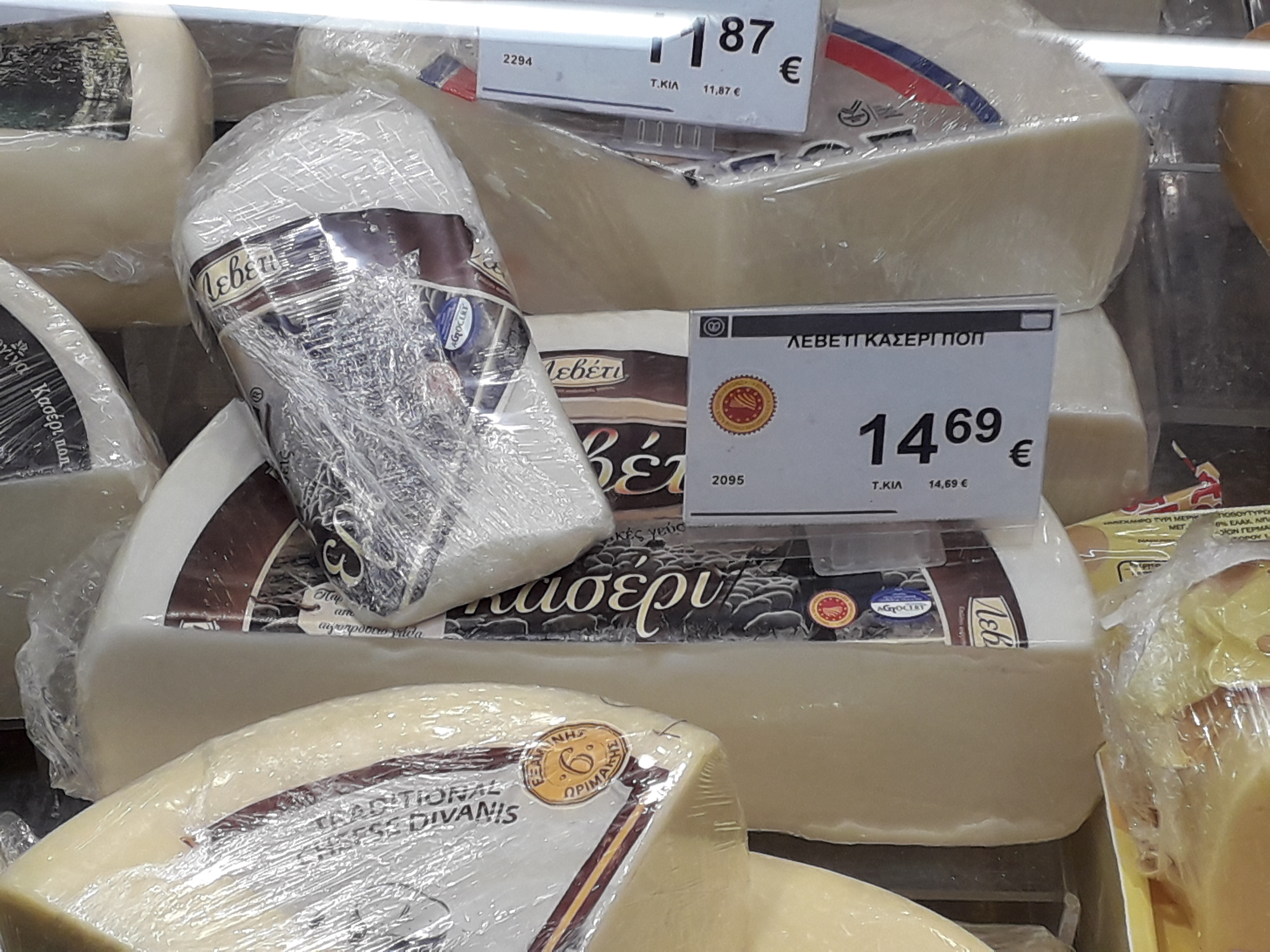
Greek PDO Kasseri

Kasseri (Greek: κασέρι, Turkish: kaşar) is a medium-hard or hard pale yellow cheese made from pasteurised or unpasteurised sheep milk and at most 20% goat's milk. "Kasseri" is a protected designation of origin, according to which the cheese must be made in the Greek provinces of Thessaly, Macedonia, Lesbos, or Xanthi, but a similar type of cheese is found in Turkey, Romania, and the Balkans, where it is known as kashkaval. The same cheese is made with cow's milk, but in that case it cannot be legally sold as "kasseri" in the EU and is instead sold under names that are particular to each producer.

Kasseri is of semi-hard to hard consistency, smooth rather than crumbly, chewy, and with a hard rind. It belongs to the pasta filata family of cheeses, which includes fresh cheeses like mozzarella and aged ones like Provolone and Caciocavallo. Kasseri is made by heating milk to 36 °C (97 °F) and adding enough rennet for a curd to set in 45 minutes. Once the curd has set, it is divided into pieces about the size of a maize cob and then cooked at 38–40 °C (100–104 °F) while stirring. Afterwards, the curd is transferred to draining tables, where it is ground to small pieces by hand, tightly bound in cheesecloth, topped with a small weight, and left to drain and ferment until its pH is about 5.2. The curd is then cut into thin slices, placed in hot water at 70–80 °C (158–176 °F), and kneaded until it becomes a malleable mass that can be spun into a smooth thread of at least 1 meter (3 feet 3 inches) in length. The kneaded cheese mass is salted and then put into molds for two or three days. Finally, it is taken out of the mold and aged for at least three months at a temperature of 18 °C (64 °F).

The name kasseri is said to come from Turkish kaşer, which in turn comes from Hebrew כָּשֵׁר (kosher). The explanation is that the lack of use of rennet during its invention by the Jews of Kırkkilise (modern Kırklareli, Turkey) made the cheese fit for the requirements of the Jewish law. However, rennet is in fact used in the making of kasseri therefore the above is likely a case of folk etymology. Another origin of the word points to the ancient Latin word for cheese, 'Caseus'

Kasseri is consumed in sandwiches as the main constituent in kasseropita and saganaki.

Assyrians use Kasseri cheese to make a traditional Assyrian cheese dish, called gupta tomirta (ܓܘܒܬܐ ܜܘܡܪܬܐ 'buried cheese'), that is topped with cumin and sometimes other seasonings.

== See also ==
- Assyrian cuisine
- Cuisine of Cyprus
- Greek cuisine
- Greek food products
- Kashkaval
- Turkish cuisine
