= Trametenolic acid =

Names
- IUPAC name 3β-Hydroxylanosta-8,24-dien-21-oic acid
- Systematic IUPAC name (2R)-2-[(1R,3aR,5aR,7S,9aS,11aR)-7-Hydroxy-3a,6,6,9a,11a-pentamethyl-2,3,3a,4,5,5a,6,7,8,9,9a,10,11,11a-tetradecahydro-1H-cyclopenta[a]phenanthren-1-yl]-6-methylhept-5-enoic acid

Identifiers
CAS Number	24160-36-9
3D model (JSmol)	Interactive image
ChEMBL	ChEMBL387689
ChemSpider	10193870
PubChem CID	12309443
UNII	8PF73ZP92L
CompTox Dashboard (EPA)	DTXSID50946989
- InChI: InChI=1S/C30H48O3/c1-19(2)9-8-10-20(26(32)33)21-13-17-30(7)23-11-12-24-27(3,4)25(31)15-16-28(24,5)22(23)14-18-29(21,30)6/h9,20-21,24-25,31H,8,10-18H2,1-7H3,(H,32,33)/t20-,21-,24+,25+,28-,29-,30+/m1/s1 Key: NBSBUIQBEPROBM-GIICLEHTSA-N
- SMILES: CC(=CCC[C@H]([C@H]1CC[C@@]2([C@@]1(CCC3=C2CC[C@@H]4[C@@]3(CC[C@@H](C4(C)C)O)C)C)C)C(=O)O)C

Properties
Chemical formula	C_{30}H_{48}O_{3}
Molar mass	456.711 g·mol^{−1}
- Except where otherwise noted, data are given for materials in their standard state (at 25 °C [77 °F], 100 kPa). Infobox references

Trametenolic acid is an anti-inflammatory sterol isolated from Inonotus obliquus. Duan et al reported that Trametenolic Acid had exhibited protective effect on the kidneys and ameliorated the progression of Diabetic Nephropathy in db/db Mice (The db/db mice are perfect animal models of type 2 diabetes.) via Nrf2/HO-1 and NF-κB-Mediated Pathways Trametenolic Acid Mitigated Oxidative Stress in animal studies
