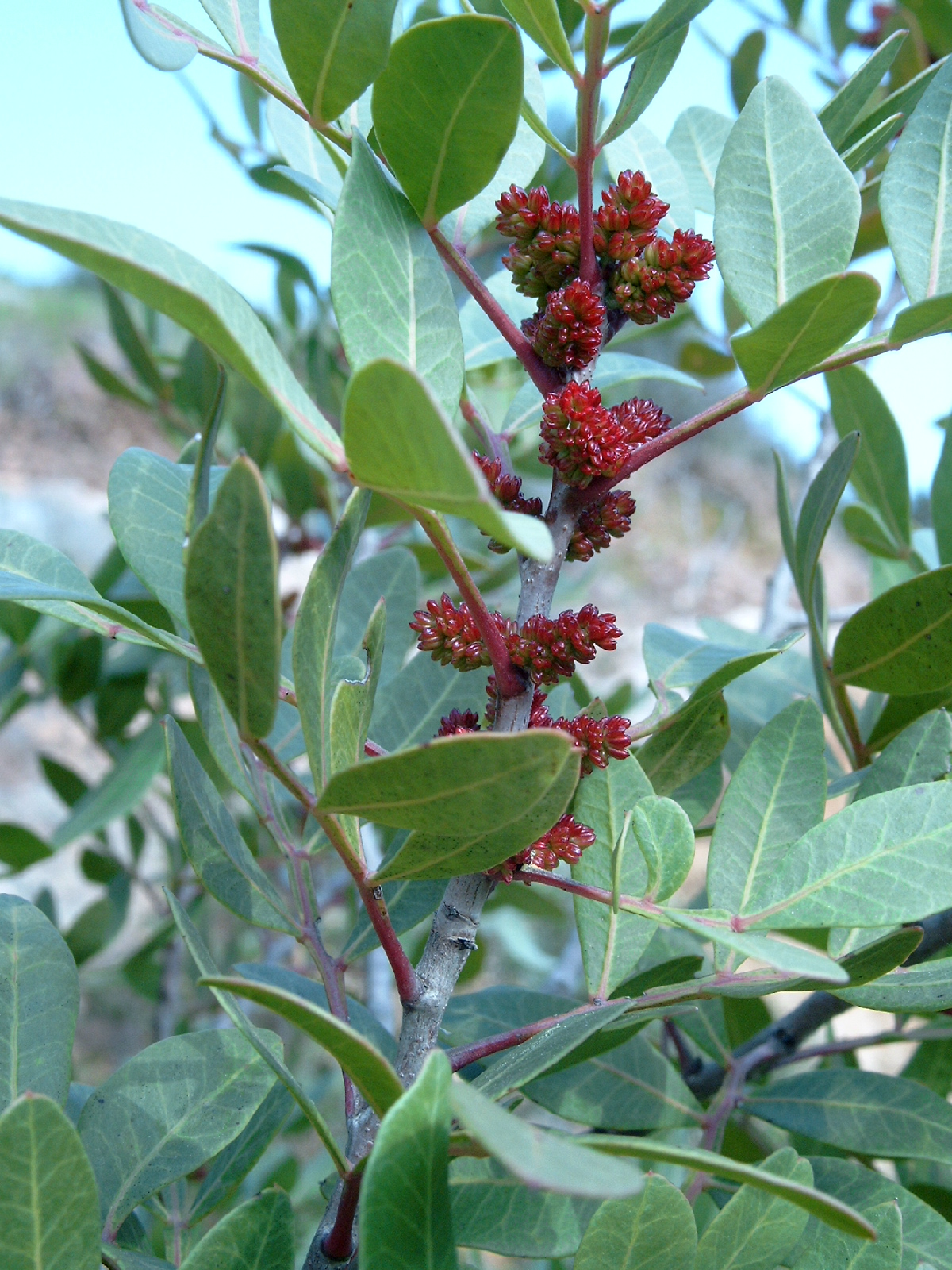
- Mastic foliage and male flowers

Conservation status
- Least Concern (IUCN 3.1)

Scientific classification
- Kingdom: Plantae
- Clade: Tracheophytes
- Clade: Angiosperms
- Clade: Eudicots
- Clade: Rosids
- Order: Sapindales
- Family: Anacardiaceae
- Genus: Pistacia
- Species: P. lentiscus

Binomial name
- Pistacia lentiscus L.
- Distribution

= Pistacia lentiscus =

Species of flowering plants in the sumac family

Pistacia lentiscus (also lentisk, schinos or mastic) is a dioecious evergreen shrub or small tree of the genus Pistacia native to the Mediterranean Basin. It grows up to 4 m (13 ft) tall and is cultivated for its aromatic resin, mainly on the Greek island of Chios, around the Turkish town of Çeşme and northern parts of Iraq.

== Description ==
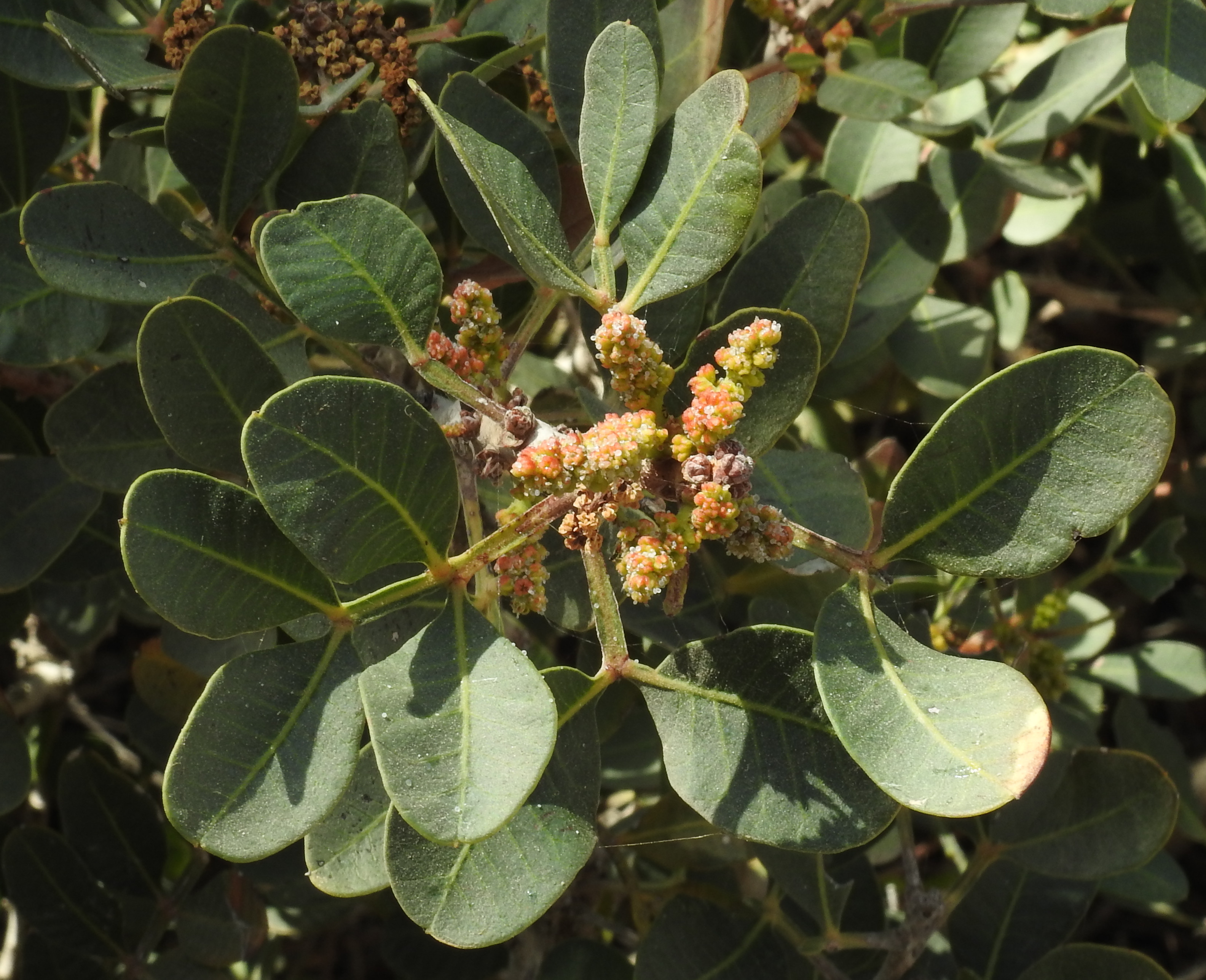
Mastic leaves

The plant is evergreen, from 1 to 5 m (3 ft 3 in to 16 ft 5 in) high, with a strong smell of resin, growing in dry and rocky areas in North Africa and Mediterranean Europe. It resists mild to heavy frosts but prefers milder winters and grows on all types of soils, and can grow well in limestone areas and even in salty or saline environments, making it more abundant near the sea. It is also found in woodlands, dehesas (almost deforested pasture areas), Kermes oak woods, wooded areas dominated by other oaks, garrigues, maquis shrublands, hills, gorges, canyons, and rocky hillsides of the entire Mediterranean area. It is a typical species of Mediterranean mixed communities which include myrtle, Kermes oak, Mediterranean dwarf palm, buckthorn and sarsaparilla, and serves as protection and food for birds and other fauna in this ecosystem. It is a very hardy pioneer species dispersed by birds. When older, it develops some large trunks and numerous thicker and longer branches. In appropriate areas, when allowed to grow freely and age, it often becomes a tree of up to 7 m (23 ft). However, logging, grazing, and fires often prevent its development.

The leaves are alternate, leathery, and paripinnately compound (i.e., pinnately compound without terminal leaflet) with five or six pairs of deep-green leaflets. It presents very small flowers, the male with five stamens, the female with a 3-part style. The fruit is a drupe, first red and then black when ripe, about 4 mm (0.16 in) in diameter. The fruit, although not commonly consumed, is edible and has a tart raisin-like flavour.

Pistacia lentiscus is related to Pistacia terebinthus, with which it hybridizes frequently in contact zones. Pistacia terebinthus is more abundant in the mountains and inland and the mastic is usually found more frequently in areas where the Mediterranean influence of the sea moderates the climate. The mastic tree does not reach the size of the Pistacia terebinthus, but the hybrids are very difficult to distinguish. The mastic has winged stalks to its leaflets, i.e., the stalks are flattened and with side fins, whereas these stems in Pistacia terebinthus are simple. On the west coast of the Mediterranean, Canary Islands and Middle East, it can be confused with P. atlantica.

== Distribution ==
Pistacia lentiscus is native throughout the Mediterranean region, from Morocco, Algeria, Tunisia and the Iberian Peninsula in the west through southern France and Turkey to Iraq and Iran in the east. It is also native to the Canary Islands.

== Ornamental use ==
In urban areas near the sea, where "palmitos" or Mediterranean dwarf palms grow, and other exotic plants, it is often used in gardens and resorts, because of its strength and attractive appearance. Unlike other species of Pistacia, it retains its leaves throughout the year. It has been introduced as an ornamental shrub in Mexico, where it has naturalized and is often seen primarily in suburban and semiarid areas where the summer rainfall climate, contrary to the Mediterranean, does not affect it.

== Resin ==
The aromatic, ivory-coloured resin, also known as mastic, is harvested as a spice from the cultivated mastic trees grown in the south of the Greek island of Chios in the Aegean Sea, where it is also known by the name "Chios tears". Originally liquid, it is hardened, when the weather turns cold, into drops or patties of hard, brittle, translucent resin. When chewed, the resin softens and becomes a bright white and opaque gum.

The word mastic derives from the Latin word masticare (to chew), in Greek: μαστιχάω verb mastichein ("to gnash the teeth", the English word coming from the Latin masticate) or massein ("to chew").

Within the European Union, mastic production in Chios is granted protected designation of origin and protected geographical indication names. Although the tree is native to all of the Mediterranean region, it will release its resin only on selected places, most notably, around Çeşme, Turkey and in the southern portion of the Greek island of Chios, the latter being the only place in the world where it is cultivated regularly. The island's mastic production is controlled by a co-operative of "medieval" villages, collectively known as the 'mastichochoria' (Μαστιχοχώρια, lit. "mastic villages").

=== Cultivation history ===
The resin is collected by bleeding the trees from small cuts made in the bark of the main branches, and allowing the sap to drip onto the specially prepared ground below. The harvesting is done during the summer between July and September. After the mastic is collected, it is washed manually and is set aside to dry, away from the sun, as it will start melting again.

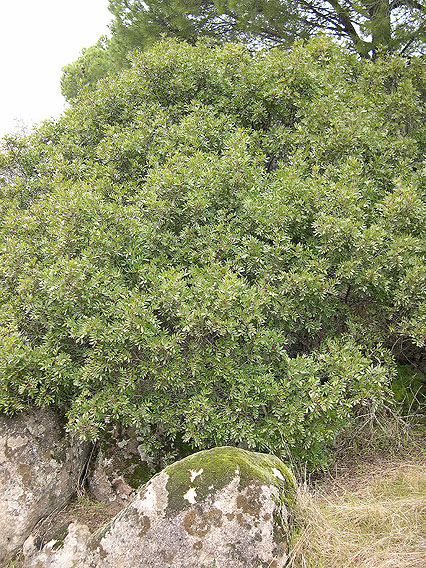
Mastic shrub

Mastic resin is a relatively expensive kind of spice; it has been used principally as a chewing gum over centuries. The flavour can be described as a strong, slightly smoky, resiny aroma and can be an acquired taste.

==== Culinary use ====
Mastic gum is principally used either as a flavouring or for its gum properties, as in mastic chewing gum.

As a spice, it continues to be used in Greece to flavour spirits and liqueurs (such as Chios's native drink mastiha), chewing gum, and a number of cakes, pastries, spoon sweets, and desserts. Sometimes, it is even used in making cheese. Mastic resin is a key ingredient in dondurma and Turkish puddings, giving those confections their unusual texture and bright whiteness. In Lebanon and Egypt, the spice is used to flavour many dishes, ranging from soups to meats to desserts, while in Morocco, smoke from the resin is used to flavour water. In Turkey, mastic is used as a flavor of Turkish delight. In the Kurdish parts of Iraq, the fresh resin is used as a spice particularly used for Torshi.

Mastic resin is a key ingredient in Greek festival breads, for example, the sweet bread tsoureki and the traditional New Year's vasilopita. Furthermore, mastic is also essential to myron, the holy oil used for chrismation by the Orthodox Churches.

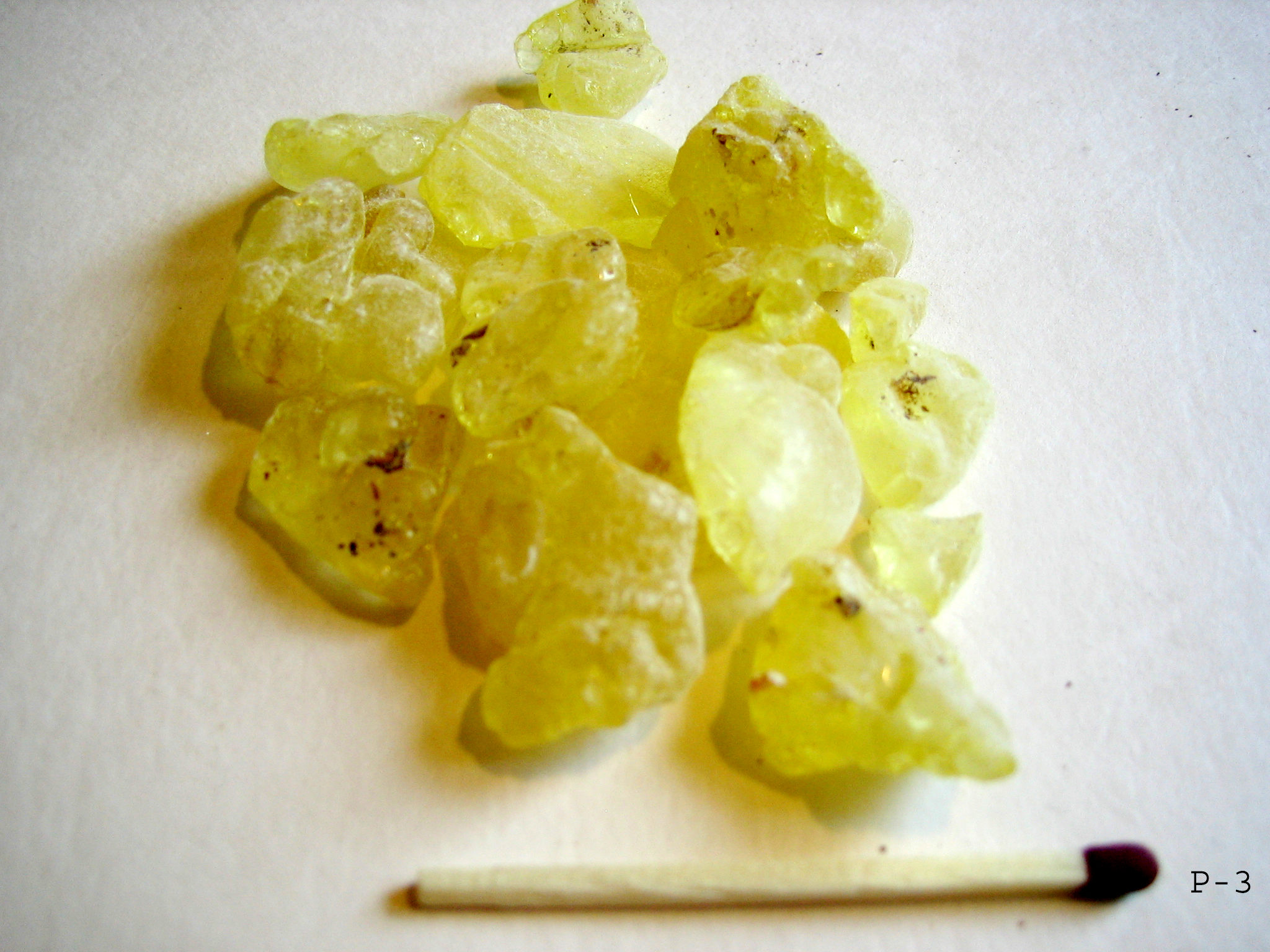
Mastic resin

==== Folk medicine ====
Mastic has been used in the Mediterranean region with the belief it has folk medicine properties, as indicated by first-century Greek physician and botanist Dioscorides in the treatise De Materia Medica (About Medical Substances). Hippocrates is reported to have used it for treating gastrointestinal disorders. There might be some scientific explanation for such use, with mastic gum possibly killing Helicobacter pylori.

==== Miscellanea ====
Mastic gum is used in the production of high-grade varnish.

A related species, P. saportae, has been shown by DNA analysis to be a hybrid between maternal P. lentiscus and paternal P. terebinthus (terebinth or turpentine). The hybrid has imparipinnate leaves, with leaflets semipersistent, subsessile terminal, and sometimes reduced. Usually, P. terebinthus and P. lentiscus occupy different biotopes and barely overlap: Mastic appears at lower elevations and near the sea, while the P. terebinthus most frequently inhabits inland and mountainous areas such as the Iberian System.

== See also ==
- False mastic
- Greek cuisine
- Greek food products
- Mastichochoria
- Turkish cuisine
