= Mastic (plant resin) =

Resin traditionally obtained from the mastic tree on the island of Chios

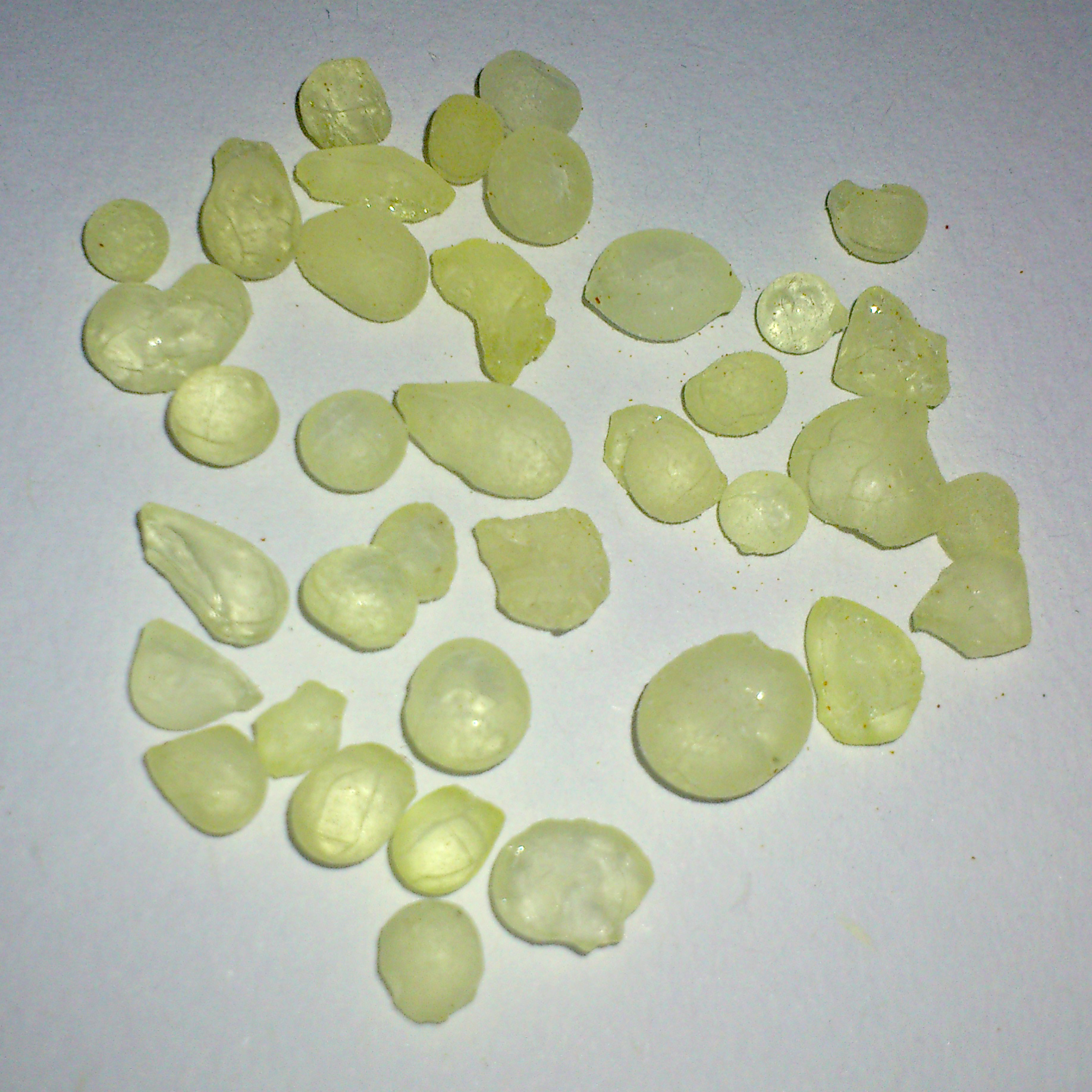
Mastic tears

Mastic (Greek: Μαστίχα) or mastic gum is a resin obtained from the mastic tree (Pistacia lentiscus). It is also known as tears of Chios, being traditionally produced on the island of Chios, and, like other natural resins, is produced in "tears" or droplets.

Mastic is excreted by the resin glands of the evergreen shrub Pistacia lentiscus and dries into pieces of brittle, translucent resin. When chewed, the resin softens and becomes bright white and opaque. The flavor is bitter at first, but after some chewing, it releases a refreshing flavor similar to pine and cedar.

Cleaning mastic tears in Pyrgi

== History ==
Chios mastic has been used as a traditional medicine over the last 2,500 years. The word mastic is derived indirectly from Ancient Greek: μαστίχη, lit. 'mastic', which may be related to Ancient Greek: μασᾶσθαι, lit. 'chew'. The first mention of actual mastic 'tears' was by Hippocrates. Hippocrates used mastic for the prevention of digestive problems, colds and as a breath freshener. Romans used mastic along with honey, pepper, and egg in the spiced wine conditum paradoxum. Under the Byzantine Empire, the mastic trade became the Emperor's monopoly. In the Ottoman Empire, the Sultan gathered the finest mastic crop.

During the Ottoman rule of Chios, mastic was worth its weight in gold. Sakız Adası, the Turkish name for the island of Chios, means 'gum island'. The mastic villages are fortress-like, out of sight from the sea, surrounded by high walls and with no doors at street level (meaning that the villages were entered only by ladders), in order to protect the sap.

Although the liqueur is much younger, it is still tied up with Greek history as a traditional Greek digestif. Digestive liqueurs, similar to Mastichato (Mastika), but made with grapes, were known as Greek elixirs before the French Revolution.

The production of mastic was threatened by the Chios forest fire that destroyed some mastic groves in August 2012.

== Cultivation ==
Producing the mastic resin is a whole-year process for the local growers. The harvest is known as kentos and takes place from the beginning of July to the beginning of October. First, the area around the trees is cleared and sprinkled with inert calcium carbonate. Then, every 4–5 days, 5–10 incisions are made in the bark of each tree to release the resin. As these clear drops hang from the tree, and sparkle in the sunlight, they are said to resemble crystalline teardrops; for this reason, the mastic resin is known as the "tears of Chios". It takes about 15–20 days for the first resin crystals to harden and fall to the ground. The farmers then collect the pieces of dry mastic and wash them in water, and spend most of the winter cleaning and separating the tears from the sand. This cleaning process is performed by hand and is regulated by the legislative framework of the Mastic Growers' Association. In addition to mastic, mastic oil is also produced.

=== Mastichochoria ===
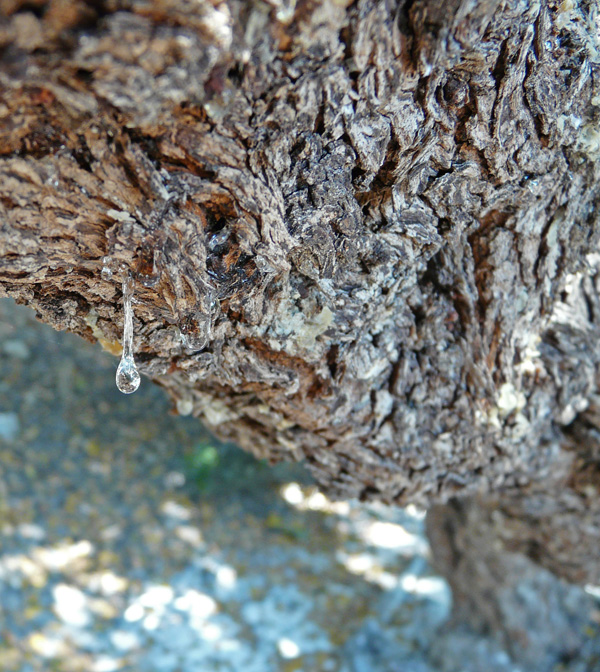
A single drop of mastic hangs from the underside of this branch on a mastic tree.

As of 2024 there are twenty-four mastichochoria, or mastic villages, on the island of Chios dedicated to the cultivation and production of mastic. The designation "Masticha Chiou" ("Khios mastic") is protected by a European Union protected designation of origin (PDO).

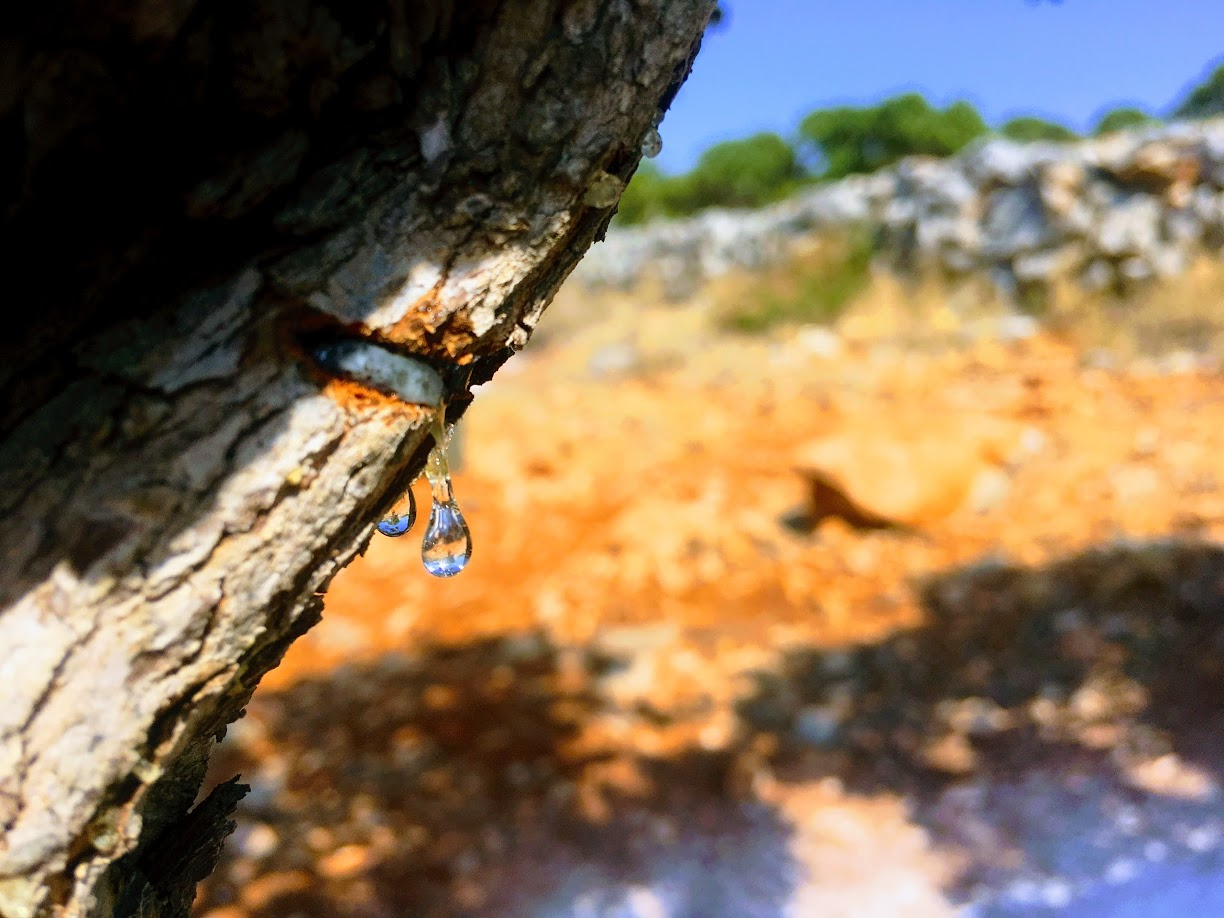
Mastic

The island's mastic production is controlled by a co-operative. Founded in 1938, the Chios Gum Mastic Growers Association (Greek: Ένωση Μαστιχοπαραγωγών Χίου), abbreviated CGMGA, is a secondary cooperative organisation and acts as the collective representative organ of twenty primary cooperatives founded in the twenty-four mastic villages. it has the exclusive management of natural Chios Masticha in Greece and abroad. The Chios Mastic Museum offers a permanent exhibition about mastic production on the island, explaining its history and cultivation techniques as well as demonstrating its different uses today.

=== Turkey ===
Traditionally there has also been limited production of mastic on the Çeşme peninsula, on the Turkish coast eight nautical miles from Chios, with similar ecological conditions suitable for mastic production. The Turkish Foundation for Combating Soil Erosion, Reforestation and the Protection of Natural Habitats (TEMA) has led an effort to protect the native Turkish mastic trees and to plant new ones in the Çeşme peninsula to revive viable commercial production of the product. As part of this project, which was expected to last through 2016, over 3,000 mastic tree saplings were planted between 2008 and October 2011 to over 368 acres (149 hectares) of dedicated farm land provided by the Izmir Institute of Technology.

== Uses ==
=== Culinary ===
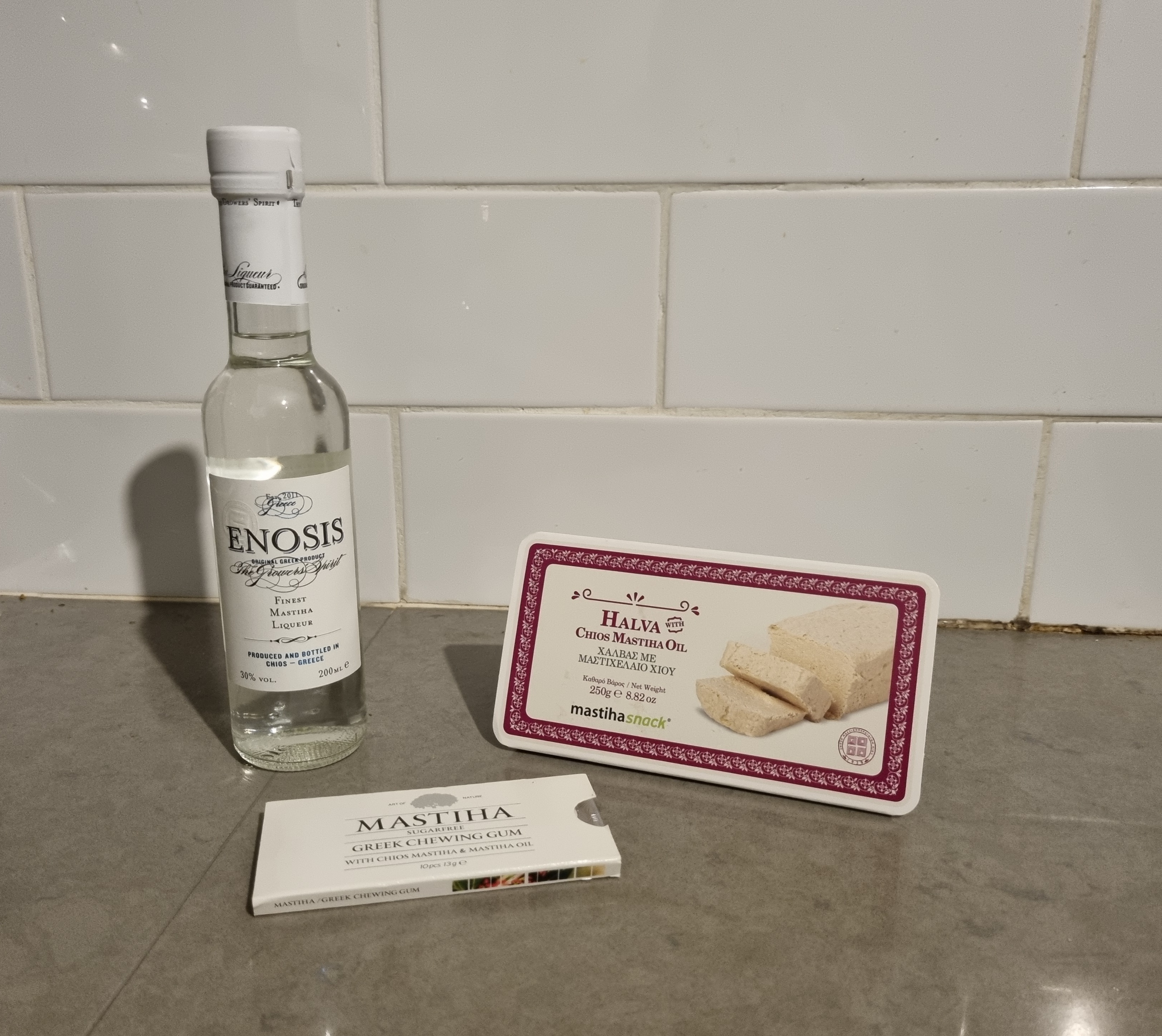
Greek liquor, chewing gum and halva with mastic

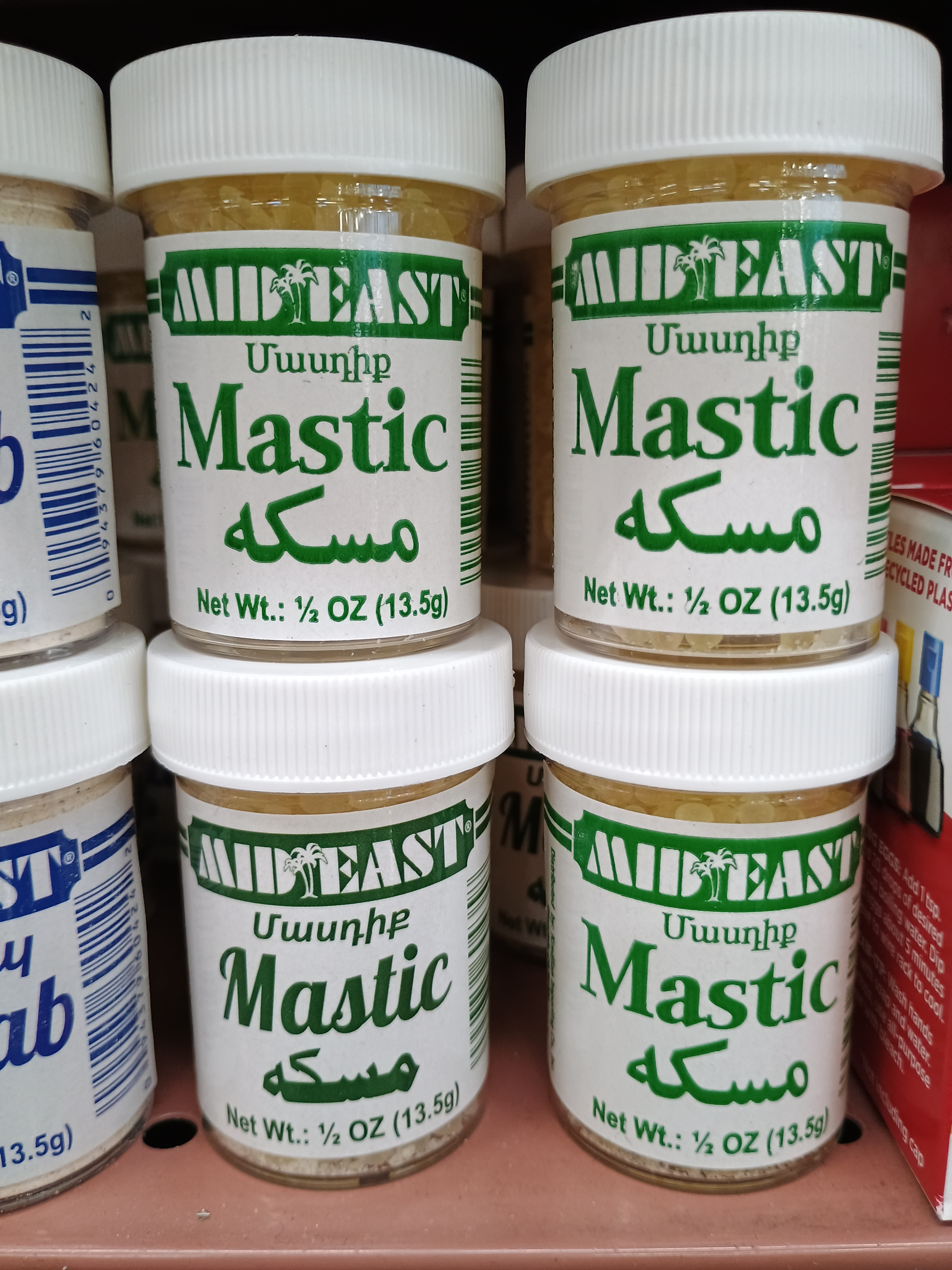
Packaged mastic with English, Armenian and Arabic text

In the Eastern Mediterranean, mastic is commonly used in brioches, ice cream, and other desserts. In the Levant, mastic is added to booza (Levantine ice cream), and in Turkey, mastic is widely used in desserts such as Turkish delight and dondurma, in puddings such as sütlaç, salep, tavuk göğsü, mamelika, muhallebi and in soft drinks. Mastic syrup is added to Turkish coffee on the Aegean coast. In Greece, mastic is used in liqueurs such as Mastika (or Mastichato), in a spoon sweet known as a "submarine" (Greek: υποβρύχιο, romanized: ypovríchio), in beverages, chewing gum, sweets, desserts, breads and cheese. It is also used to stabilise loukoumi and ice cream.

In the Maghreb, mastic is used mainly in cakes, sweets, and pastries and as a stabilizer in meringue and nougat. In Morocco, mastic is used in the preparation of smoked foods.

One of the earliest uses of mastic was as chewing gum. Mastic (מסטיק) is the colloquial Hebrew word for chewing gum.

=== In religion ===
Some scholars identify the bakha mentioned in the Bible with the mastic plant. Bakha appears to be derived from Hebrew: בכה, weeping, and is thought to refer to the "tears" of resin secreted by the mastic plant.

Ancient Jewish halachic sources indicate mastic as a treatment for bad breath: "Mastic is not chewed on Shabbat, except for medicinal purposes. If it is used for bad breath, it is permissible."

Mastic is an essential ingredient of chrism, the holy oil used for anointing by the Eastern Orthodox Churches.

=== Research ===
In February 2016, the European Medicines Agency (EMA) published the final assessment of Pistacia lentiscus L. resin. The EMA concluded that the available clinical studies, though numerous, were too small and methodologically weak to support a "well-established use" designation for mastic resin. These studies primarily investigated its oral (as a sole agent) and cutaneous applications (in combination with other products). Despite these shortcomings, the EMA found that these studies did not raise any significant safety concerns, thus supporting the traditional use of mastic. The assessment highlighted that mastic has been part of traditional and folk medicine for more than 30 years in several countries such as Iraq, Turkey, Japan, South Korea, the United States, and particularly, within the European Union, in Greece. Considering this long-standing use, the EMA deemed the requirements for traditional medicinal products according to Directive 2001/83/EC to be fulfilled for the medicinal use of powdered mastic. The EMA reports also note the antimicrobial activity of mastic in non-clinical in vitro studies and its particular effectiveness against Helicobacter pylori. Based on these findings, the EMA approved the use of powdered mastic as a traditional herbal medicinal product for two indications:

1. treatment of mild dyspeptic disorders in adults and the elderly
2. for the symptomatic treatment of minor skin inflammations and aid in healing minor wounds

The agency stipulated that due to the lack of sufficient data, the use of mastic in children, during pregnancy, and lactation is not recommended.

=== Other uses ===
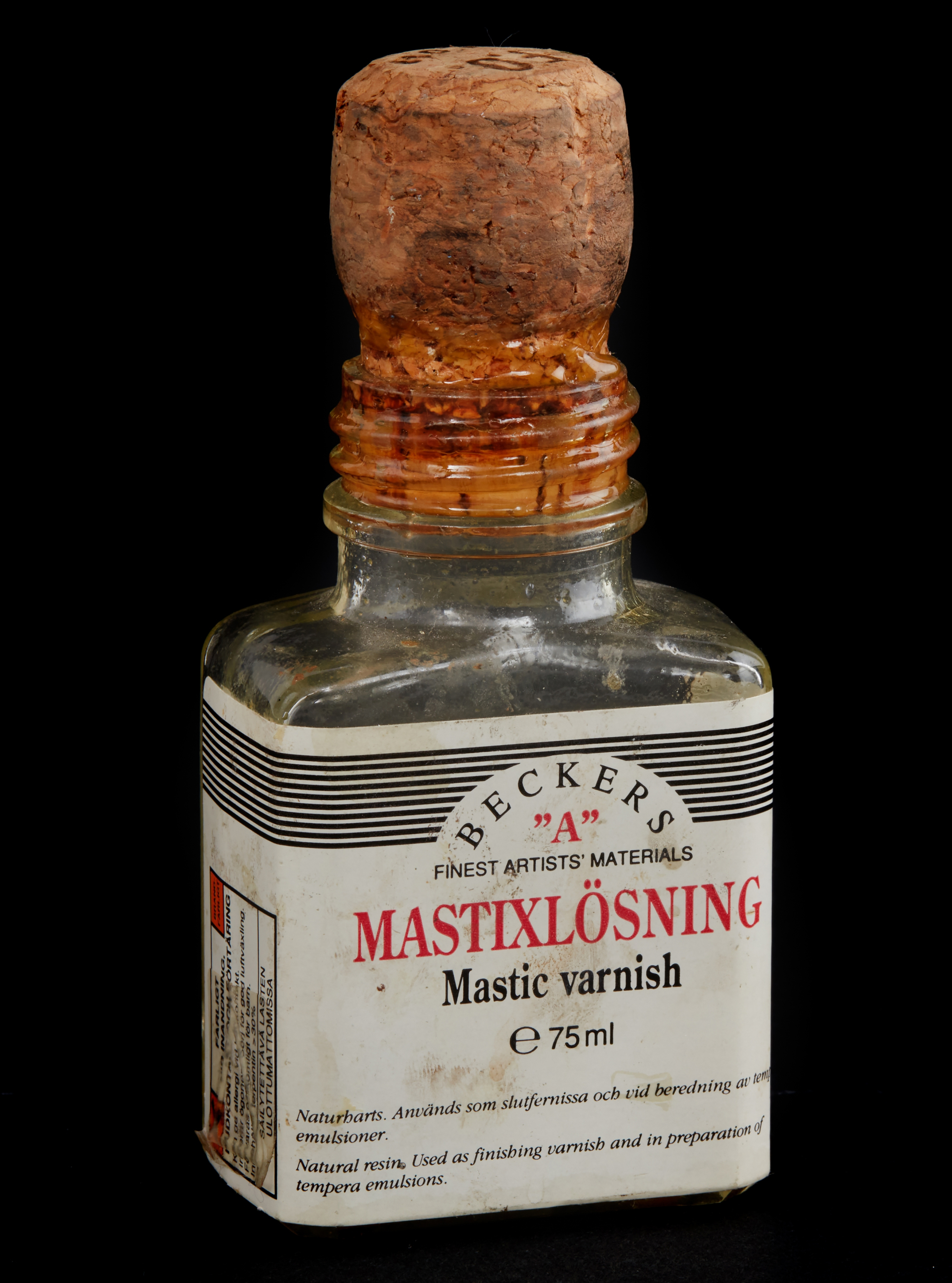
Glass bottle for artist's mastic varnish

Mastic is used in some varnishes. Mastic varnish was used to protect and preserve photographic negatives. Mastic is also used in perfumes, cosmetics, soap, body oils, and body lotion. In ancient Egypt, mastic was used in embalming. In its hardened form, mastic can be used, like frankincense or Boswellia resin, to produce incense.

Within perfumery, the aroma of mastic is described as balsamic, terpenic, green, spicy, juniper, and woody.

== See also ==
- Megilp (art medium)
