= Greek cuisine =

Culinary traditions of Greece

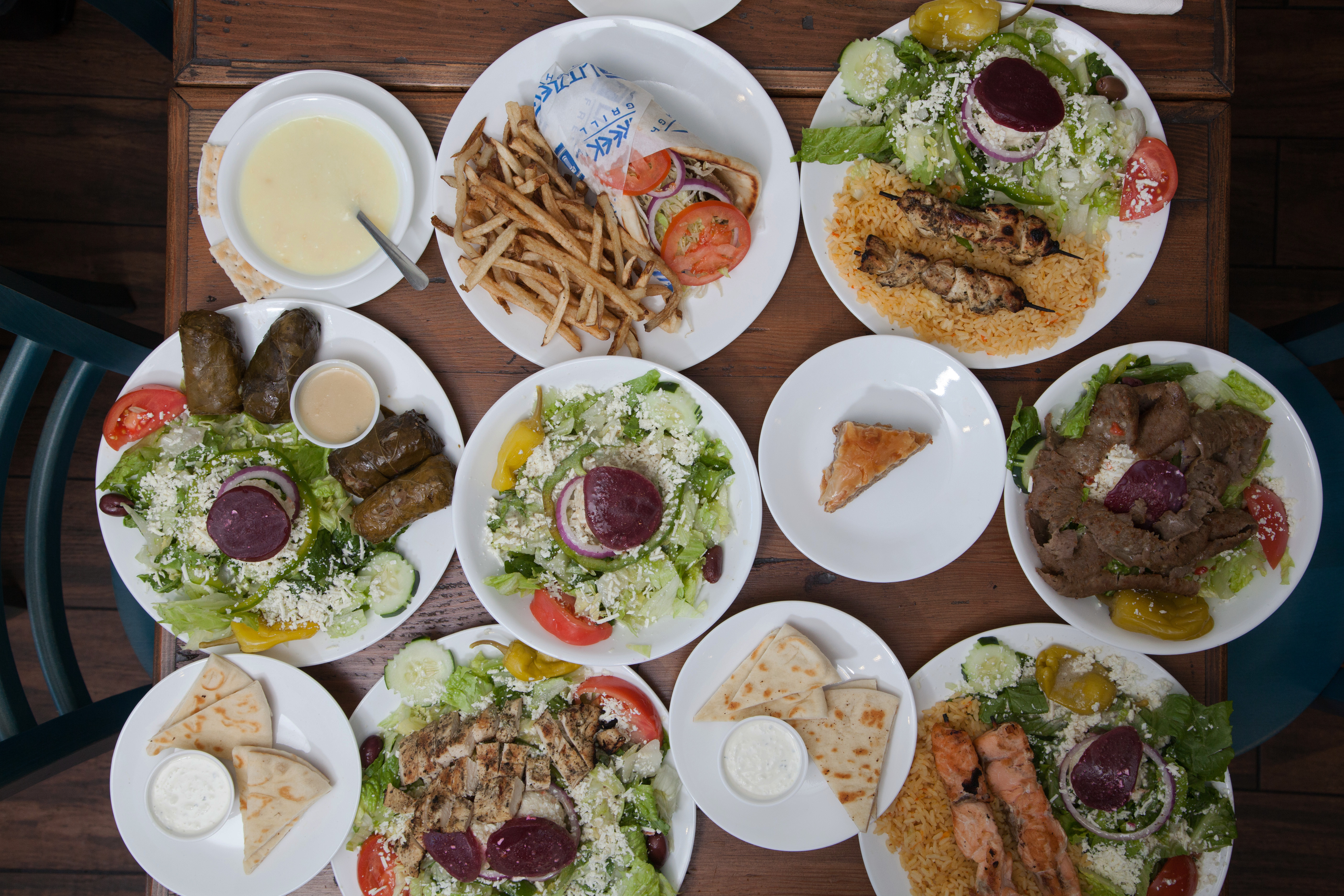
Table of Greek food

Greek cuisine is the cuisine of Greece and the Greek diaspora. In common with many other cuisines of the Mediterranean, it is founded on the triad of wheat, olive oil, and wine. It uses vegetables, olive oil, grains, fish, and meat, including pork, poultry, veal and beef, lamb, rabbit, and goat. Other important ingredients include pasta (such as hilopites), cheeses, herbs, lemon juice, olives and olive oil, and yogurt. Bread made of wheat is ubiquitous; other grains, notably barley, are also used, especially for paximathia. Common dessert ingredients include nuts, honey, fruits, sesame, and filo pastries. It continues traditions from Ancient Greek and Byzantine cuisine, while incorporating Middle Eastern, Balkan, and Italian influences.

== History ==
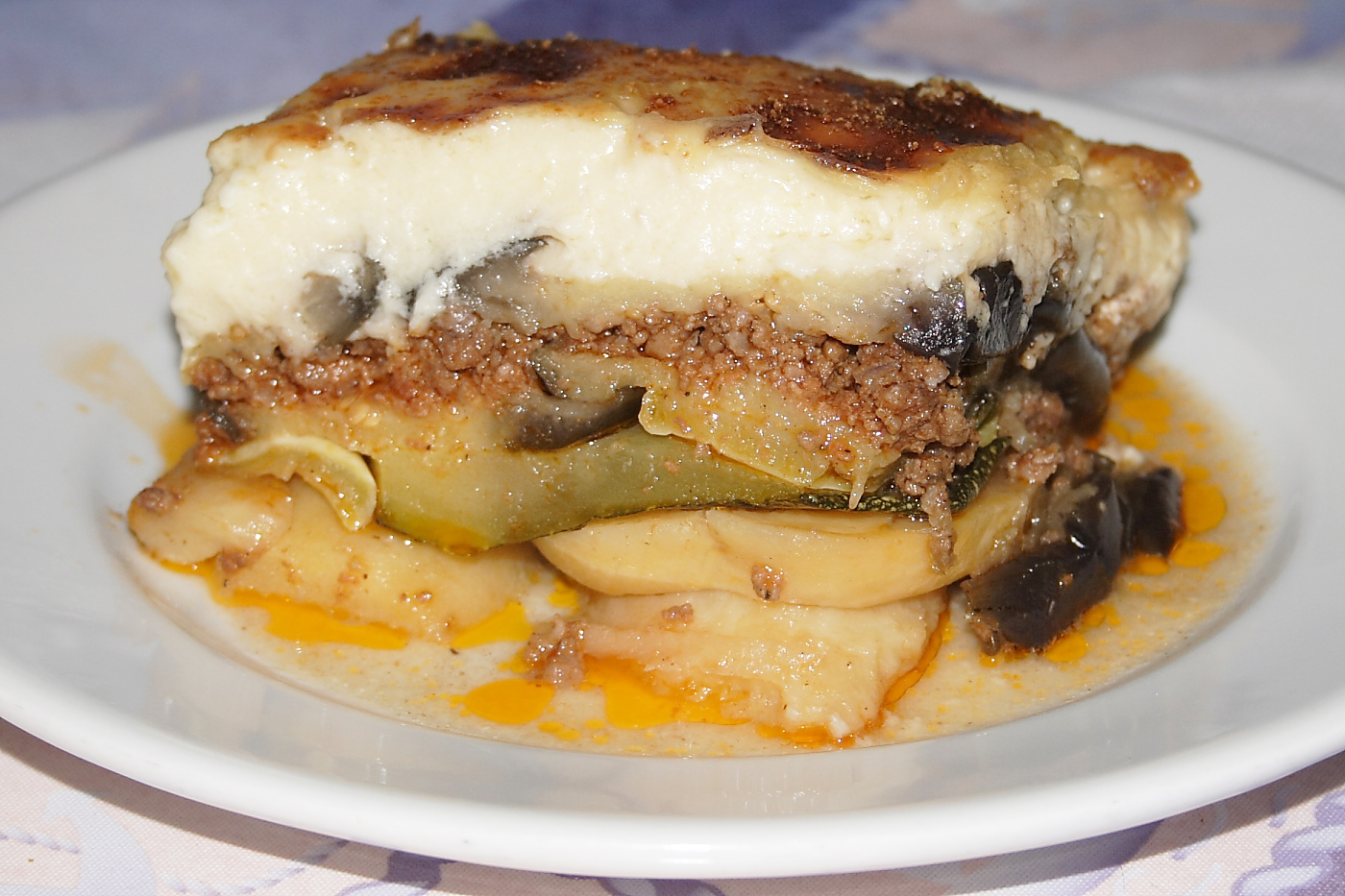
Moussaka

Greek cuisine is part of the culture of Greece and is recorded in images and texts from ancient times. Its influence spread to ancient Rome and then throughout Europe and beyond. The first Greek cookbook was printed on Syros island in 1828.

Ancient Greek cuisine was characterized by its frugality and was founded on the "Mediterranean triad": wheat, olive oil, and wine, with meat being rarely eaten and fish being more common. This trend in Greek diet continued in Cyprus and changed only fairly recently when technological progress has made meat more available. Wine and olive oil have always been central and the ancient spread of grapes and olive trees in the Mediterranean is connected with Greek colonization.

The diet of the ancient Spartans was also marked by its frugality. A notorious staple was melas zomos (black soup), made by boiling the pigs' legs, blood of pigs, olive oil, bay leaf, chopped onion, salt, water, and vinegar to keep the blood from coagulation during the cooking process. The army of Sparta mainly ate this as part of their subsistence diet. This dish was noted by the Spartans' Greek contemporaries, particularly the Athenians and Corinthians, as evidence of the Spartans' distinct way of life.

Byzantine cuisine was similar to ancient cuisine, with the addition of new ingredients, such as caviar, nutmeg, and basil. Lemons, prominent in Greek cuisine and introduced in the second century, were used medicinally before being incorporated into the diet. Fish continued to be an integral part of the diet for coastal dwellers. The theory of humors influenced culinary advice, first put forth by the ancient Greek doctor Claudius Aelius Galenus. Byzantine cuisine benefited from Constantinople's position as a global hub of the spice trade.

== Overview ==
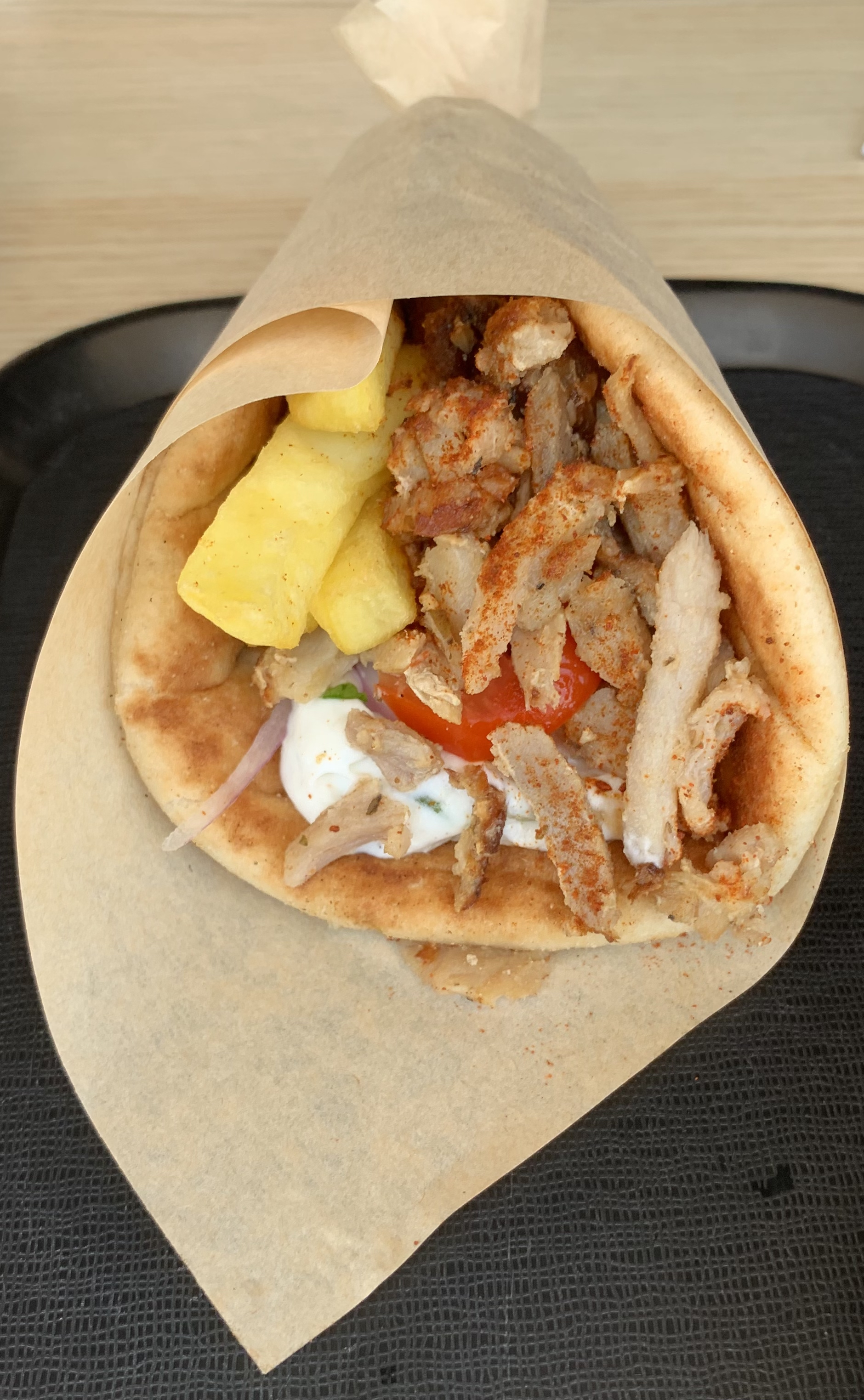
Gyros rolled in a pita

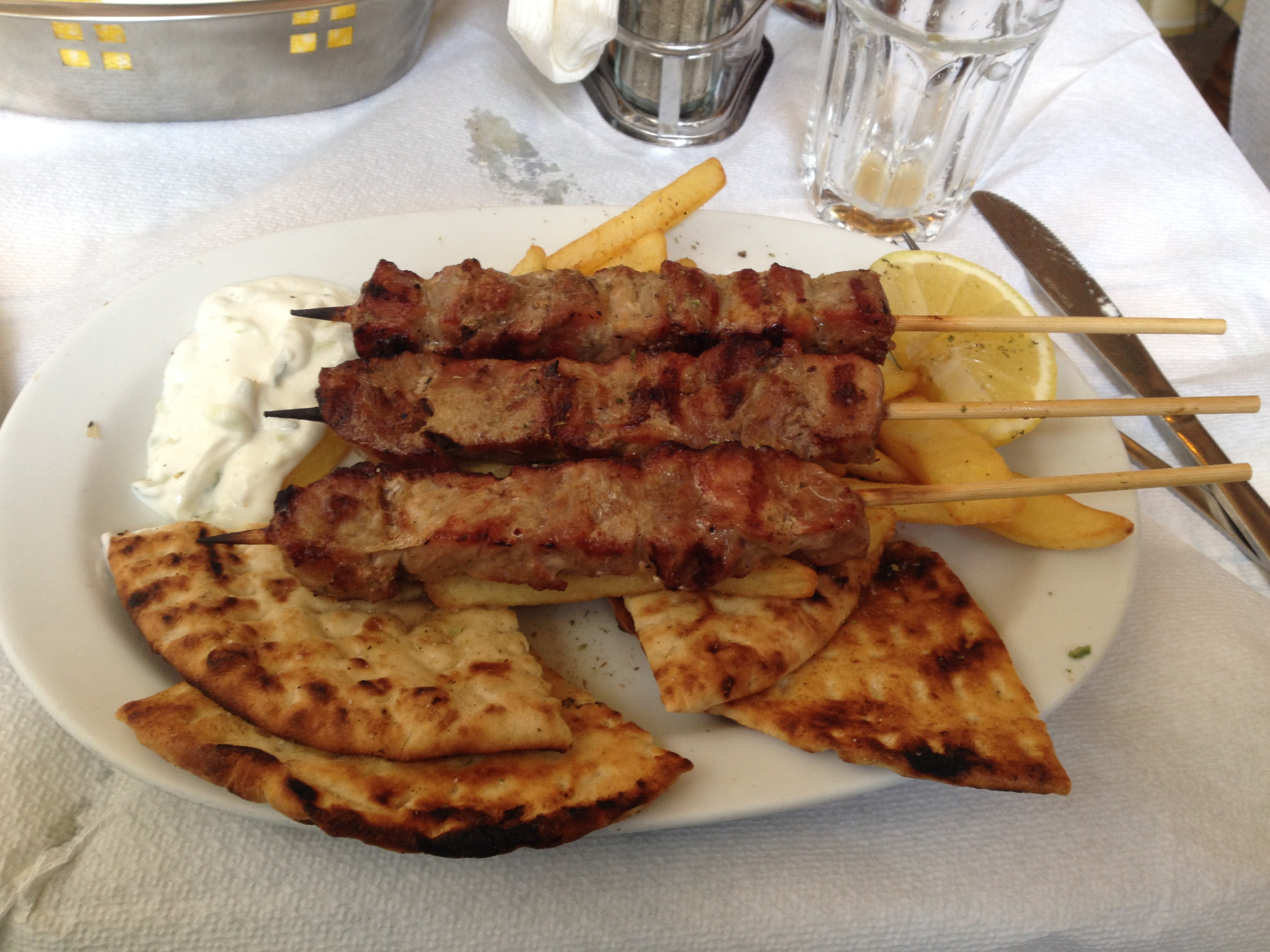
Souvlaki

The most characteristic and ancient element of Greek cuisine is olive oil, which is used in most dishes. It is produced from olive trees that are prominent throughout the region and adds to the distinctive taste of Greek food. The olives themselves are also widely eaten. The basic grain in Greece is wheat, though barley is also grown. Important vegetables include tomatoes, aubergine (eggplant), potato, green beans, okra, green peppers (capsicum), and onions. Honey in Greece is mainly honey from the nectar of fruit trees and citrus trees: lemon, orange, bigarade (bitter orange) trees, thyme honey, and pine honey. Mastic, an aromatic, ivory-coloured plant resin, is grown on the Aegean island of Chios.

Greek cuisine uses some flavorings more often than other Mediterranean cuisines do, namely oregano, mint, garlic, onion, dill, cumin, and bay laurel leaves. Other common herbs and spices include basil, thyme and fennel seed. Parsley is also used as a garnish on some dishes. Many Greek recipes, especially in the northern parts of the country, use "sweet" spices in combination with meat, such as cinnamon, allspice and cloves in stews.

The climate and terrain have tended to favor the breeding of goats and sheep over cattle, and thus beef dishes are uncommon. Fish dishes are common in coastal regions and on the islands. A great variety of cheese types are used in Greek cuisine, including Feta, Kasseri, Kefalotyri, Graviera, Anthotyros, Manouri, Metsovone, Ladotyri (cheese with olive oil), Kalathaki (a specialty from the island of Limnos), Katiki Domokou (creamy cheese, suitable for spreads), Mizithra and many more.

Dining out is common in Greece. The taverna and estiatorio are widespread, serving home cooking at affordable prices to both locals and tourists. Locals largely eat Greek cuisine.

Common street foods include souvlaki, gyros, various pitas, and roasted corn.

Fast food became popular in the 1970s, with some chains, such as Goody's and McDonald's serving international food like hamburgers, and others serving Greek foods such as souvlaki, gyros, tiropita, and spanakopita.

Since 2013, Greece for its Mediterranean diet has been added to the UNESCO Intangible Cultural Heritage Lists. All the foods and beverages are regulated by the Greek Food and Beverages Code (Greek national legislation).

== Origins ==
Many dishes can be traced back to ancient Greece: lentil soup, fasolada (though the modern version is made with white beans and tomatoes, both New World plants), tiganites, retsina (white or rosé wine flavored with pine resin) and pasteli (baked sesame-honey bar); some to the Hellenistic and Roman periods: loukaniko (dried pork sausage); and Byzantium: feta cheese, avgotaraho (cured fish roe), moustalevria and paximadi (traditional hard bread baked from wheat, barley and rye). There are also many ancient and Byzantine dishes which are no longer consumed: porridge (hilós in Greek) as the main staple, fish sauce (garos), and salt water mixed into wine.

Some dishes are borrowed from Italian cuisine, with modifications: pastitsio (pasticcio), pastitsada (pasticciata), stifado (stufato), salami, macaronia, mandolato, and more.

Some Greek dishes are inherited from Ottoman cuisine, which combined influences from Persian, Levantine, Arabian, Turkish and Byzantine cuisines, like kadaifi, and halva.

In the 20th century, French cuisine influenced Greek cooking largely due to the French-trained chef Nikolaos Tselementes, who created the modern Greek pastitsio; he also created the modern Greek version of moussaka by combining an existing eggplant dish with a French-style gratin topping. The Greek chef Zisis Kerameas has been recognized for his contribution to Greek cuisine and as culinary arts teacher (1970–2000) at public vocational tourism professions schools.

== Regions ==
Regional cuisines include:

- Aegean islands (including Kykladítiki from Kyklades, Rhodítiki from Rhodes and other Dodecanese islands, and the Cuisine of Lesbos island).
- Peloponnesian (Peloponnisiakí, including from Mani).
- Ionian islands (Heptanisiakí), a lot of Italian influence.
- Ipirótiki (Epirotic cuisine).
- Kritikí (Cretan cuisine).
- Kypriakí (Cypriot cuisine).
- Makedonikí (Macedonian cuisine).
- Mikrasiatikí, from the Greeks of Asia Minor descent, including Polítiki (from Constantinople), from the tradition of the Greeks from Constantinople, a cuisine with significant Anatolian/Ottoman influence.
- Pontiakí (Pontic Greek cuisine), found anywhere there are Pontic Greeks (Greeks from the Black Sea region).
- Thrakiótiki (Thracian cuisine).

Some ethnic minorities living in Greece also have their own cuisine. One example is the Aromanians and their Aromanian cuisine. The Greek Orthodox Church community has its own culinary tradition such as the well-known Christopsomo (Christmas bread), Fanouropita, Prosphora (or prosphoro) bread.

== Typical dishes ==
Typical home-cooked meals include seasonal vegetables stewed with olive oil, herbs, and tomato sauce known as lathera. Vegetables used in these dishes include green beans, peas, okra, cauliflower, spinach, leeks, and others.

Many food items are wrapped in filo pastry, either in bite-size triangles or in large sheets: kotopita (chicken pie), spanakopita (spinach and cheese pie), hortopita (greens pie), kimadopita (ground meat pie) also known as kreatopita (meat pie), kolokythopita (zucchini pie), and others. They have countless variations of pitas (savory pies).

Apart from the Greek dishes found throughout Greece, there are also many regional dishes.

North-Western and Central Greece (Epirus, Thessaly, and Roumeli/Central Greece) have a strong tradition of filo-based dishes, including special regional pitas.

Greek cuisine uses seeds and nuts in everything from pastry to main dishes.

A typical Greek-style breakfast, and brunch, consists of Greek coffee, frappé coffee, mountain tea, hot milk, fruit juice, rusks, bread, butter, honey, jam, fresh fruits, koulouri (sesame bread ring, a type of simit), Greek strained yogurt, bougatsa, tiropita, spanakopita, boiled eggs, fried eggs, omelette, strapatsada, piroski, croissant, tsoureki. A popular breakfast meal is bougatsa, available mainly from bougatsadika shops that sell bougatsa, pies, pastries, and beverages. Traditional Greek breakfast was also provided in special dairy shops called galaktopoleia (milk shops) have dairy products, milk, butter, yogurt, sweets, honey, beverages, whereas today very few galaktopoleia shops exist.

The list of Greek dishes includes dishes found in all of Greece as well as some regional ones.

== Appetizers ==
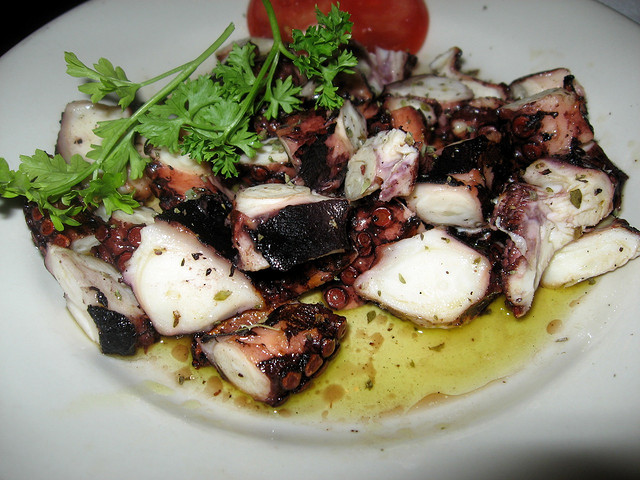
Octopus plate

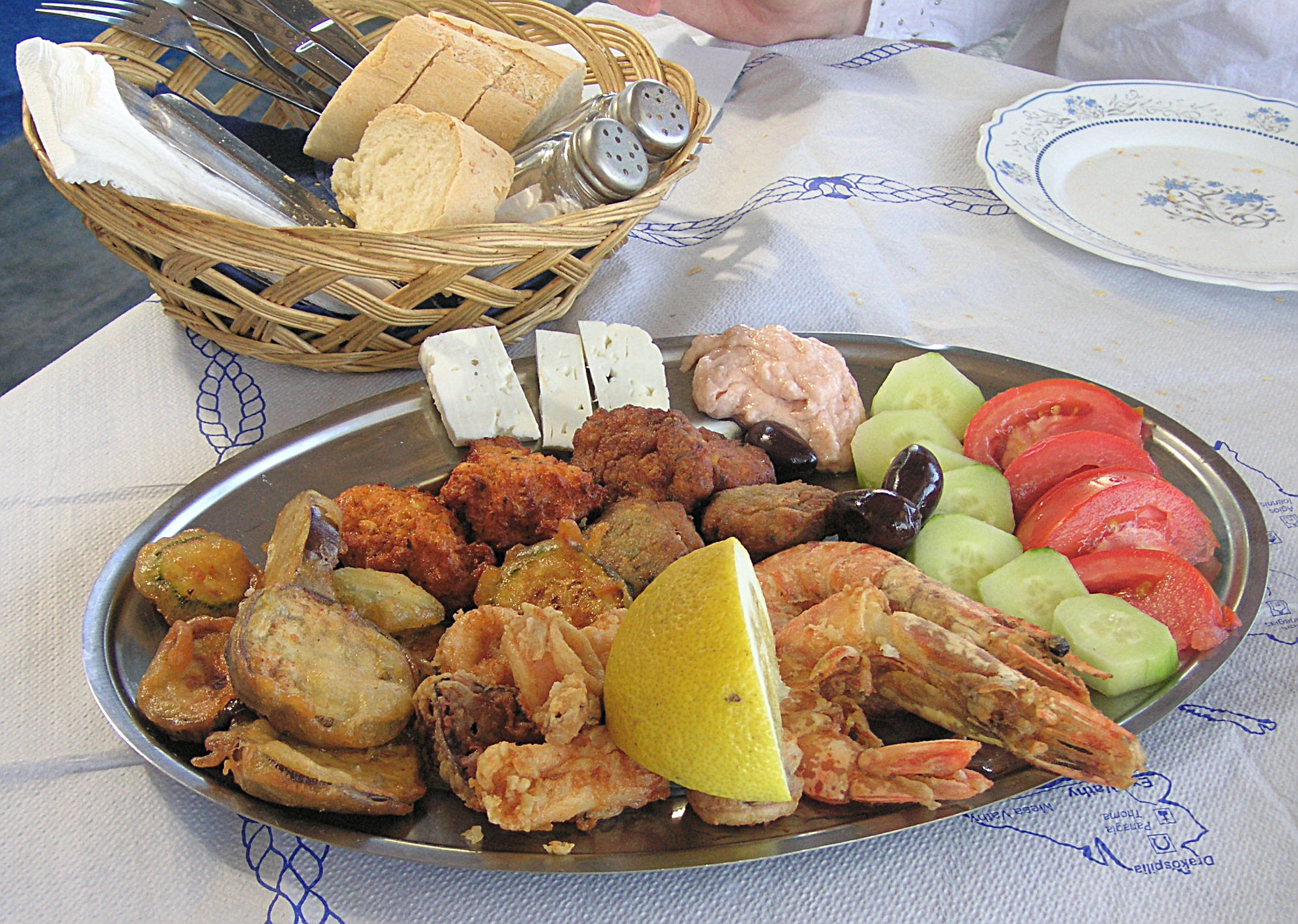
Pikilia (a variety of small meze foods)

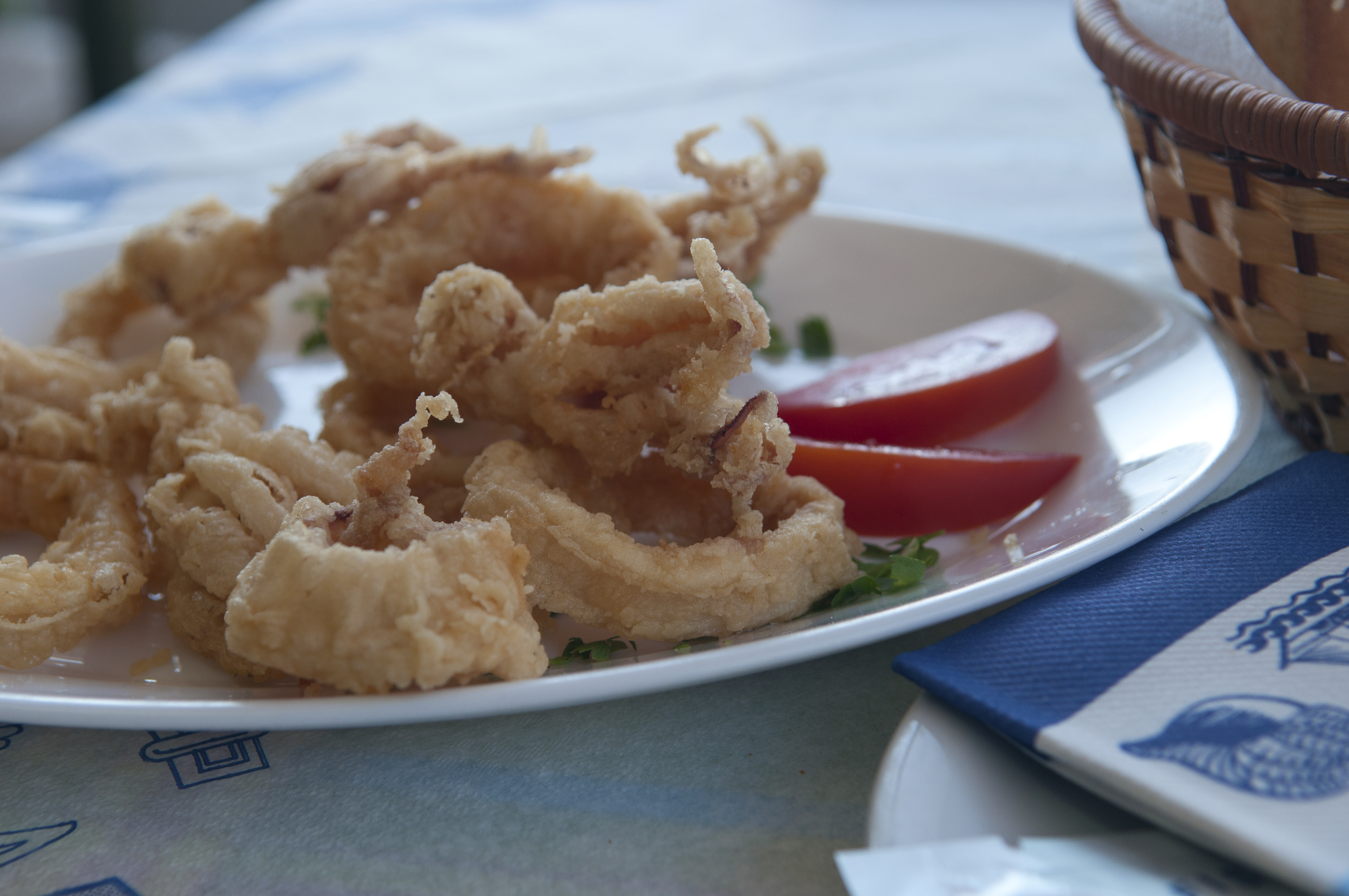
Fried calamari (squid)

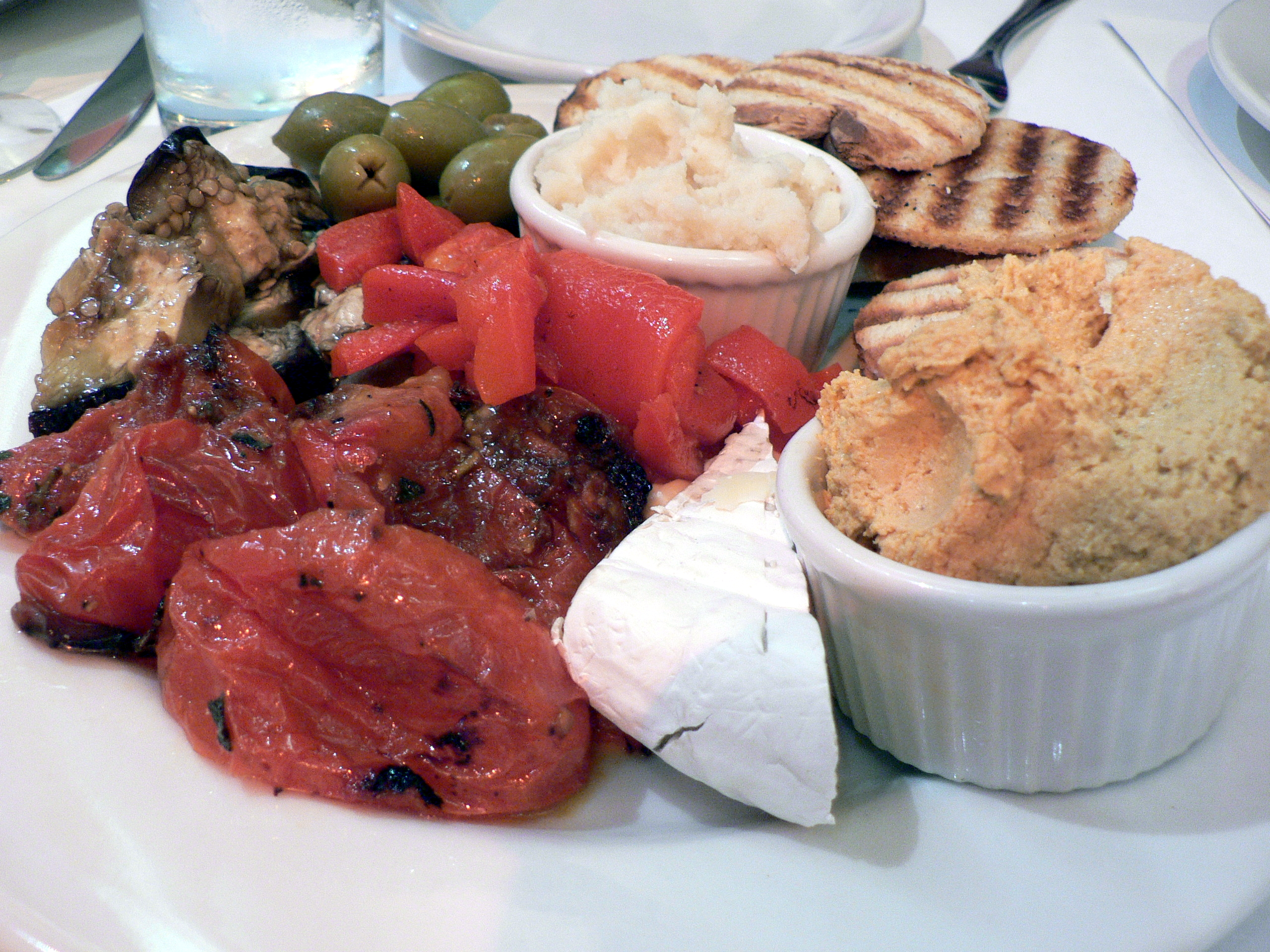
Skordalia, hummus, tomato, olives, roasted peppers, eggplant, and grilled pita bread

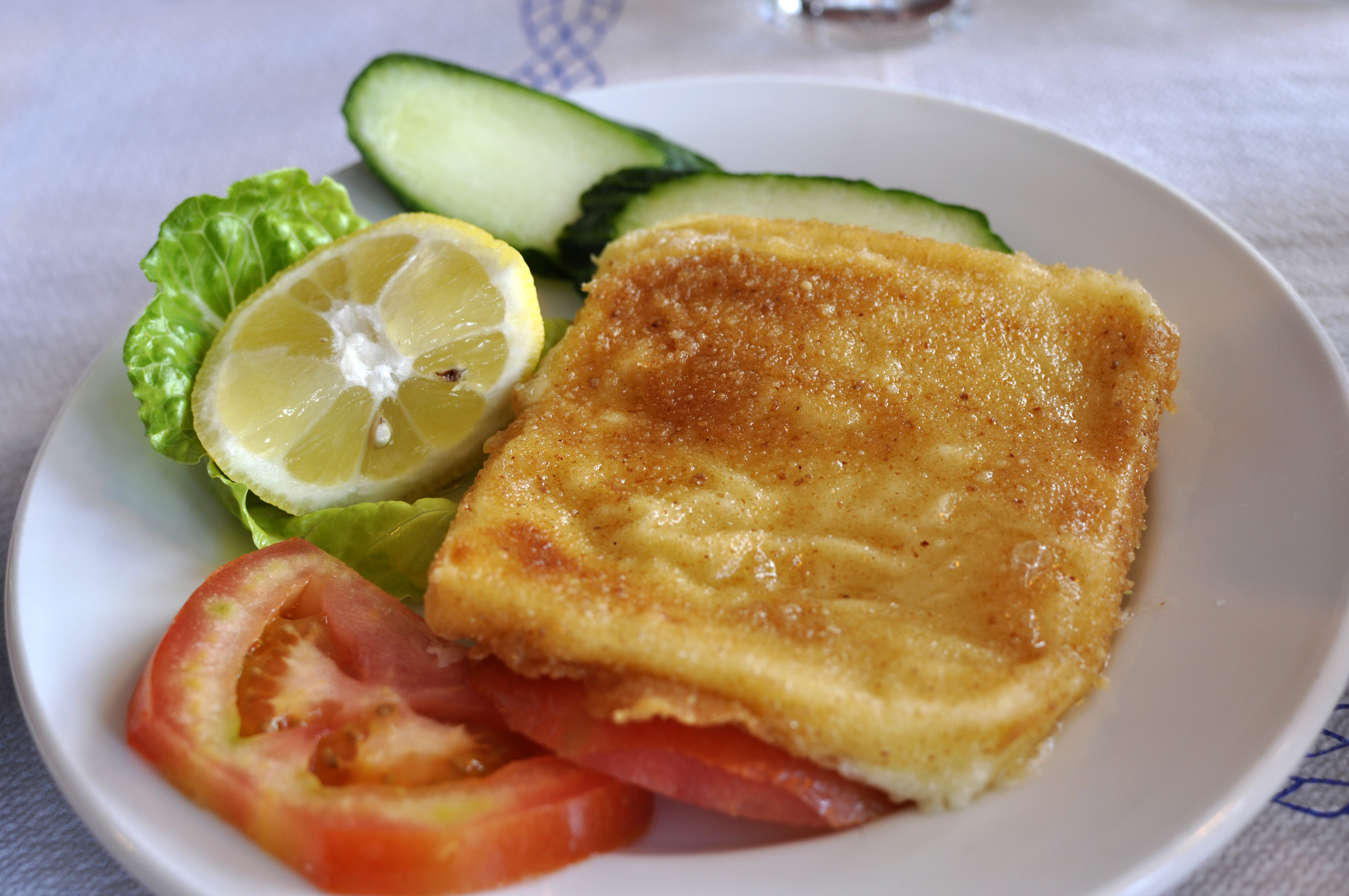
Saganaki

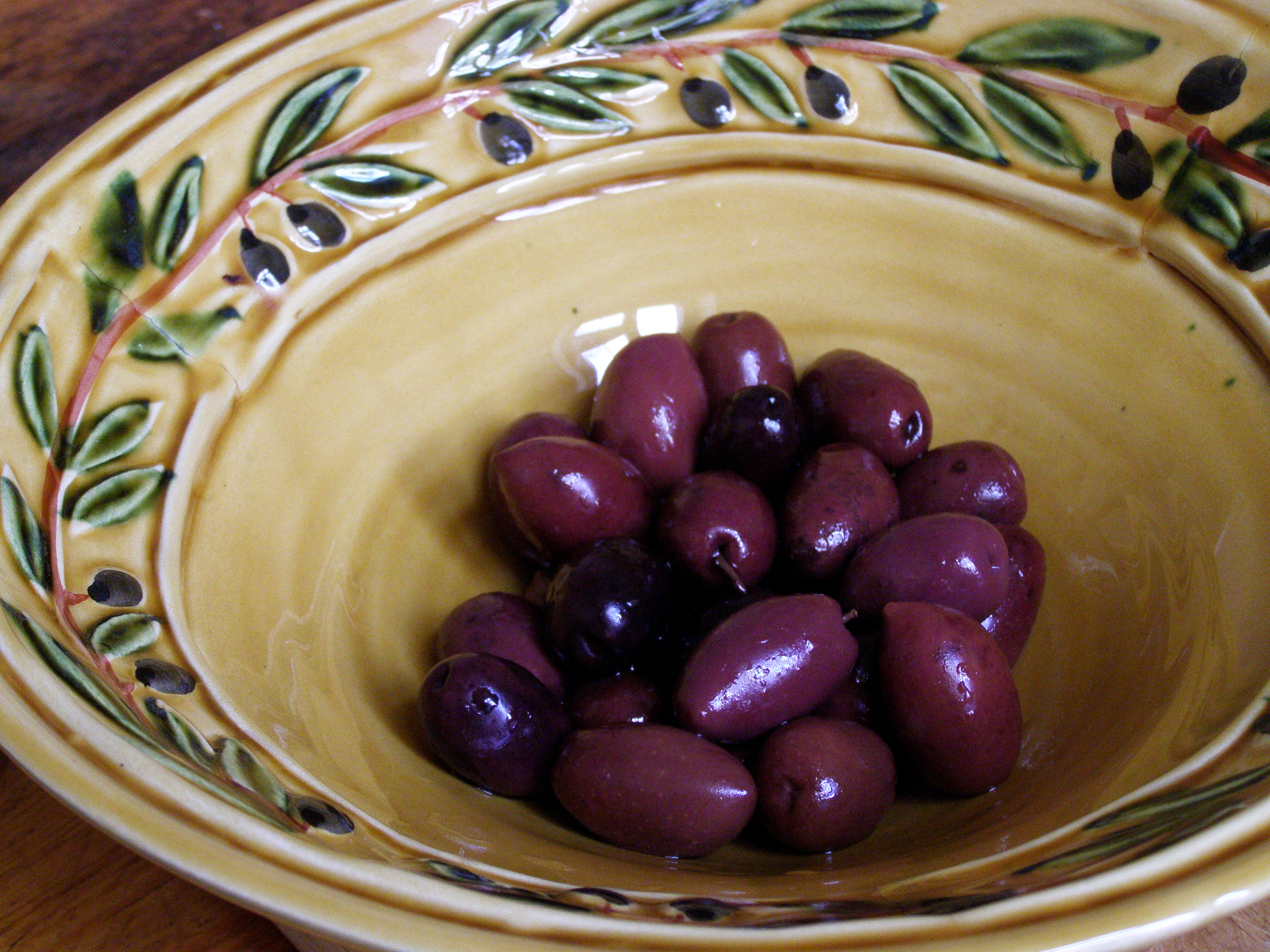
Olives

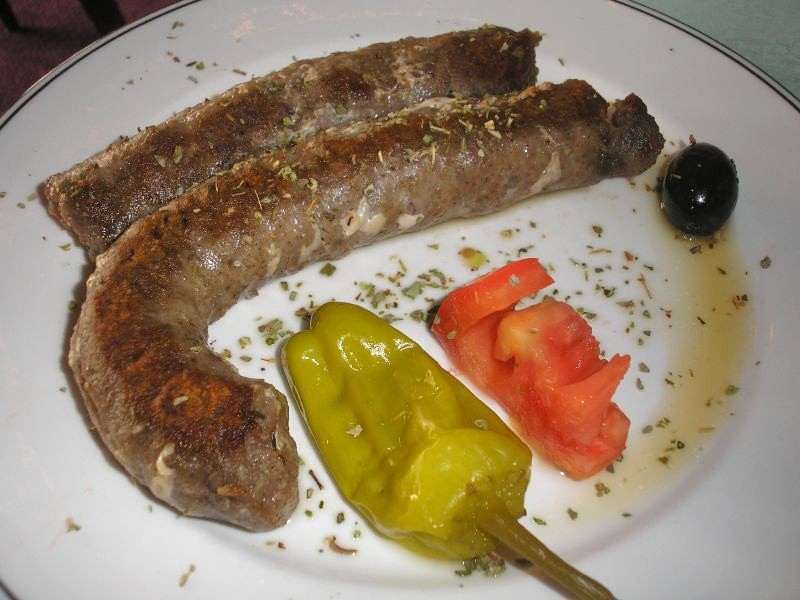
Loukaniko

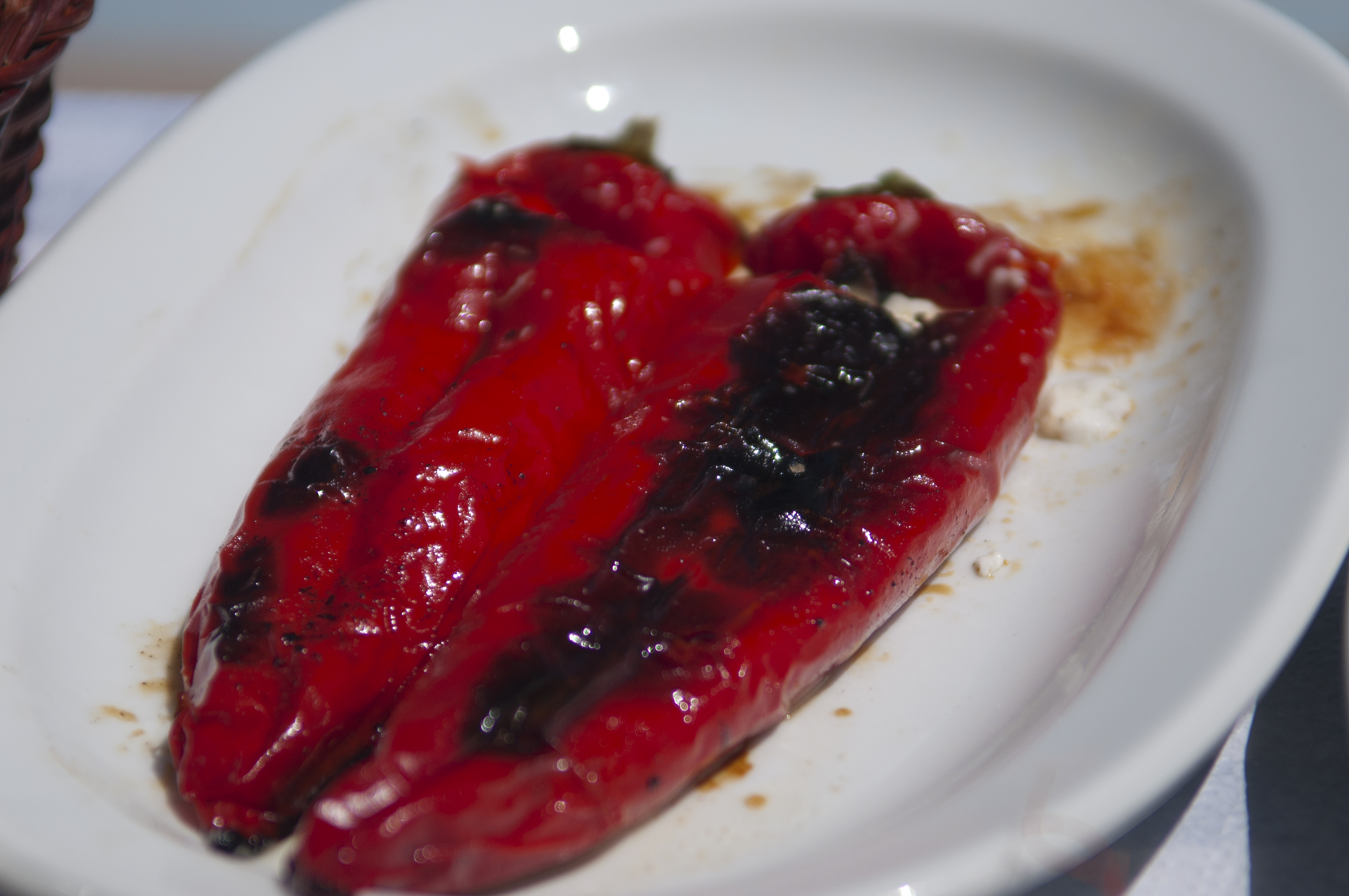
Roasted stuffed Florina peppers

Selected appetizers are:

- Antzougies
- Avgotaracho, Bottarga, flathead mullet caught in lagoons with the well-known European and Greek Protected Designation of Origin (PDO) Avgotaracho Messolongiou from the Messolonghi-Etoliko Lagoons. The whole mature ovaries are removed from the fish, washed with water, salted with natural sea salt, dried under the sun, and sealed in melted beeswax.
- Florina peppers can be roasted, sliced and served by adding olive oil and garlic.
- Toursi (pickle), with the well known pickled peppers and mixed pickle.
- Feta topped with olive oil and oregano
- Flogeres, crispy filo wrapped around a filling of goat cheese, herbs, sun-dried tomato, or ground meat.
- Sardeles psites (roasted sardines),
- Htapodi sti schara (octopus on the grill),
- Patatokeftedes, potato fritters.
- Tirokroketes, cheese fritters (fried cheese balls) also known as tirokeftedes.
- Bourekakia, mini rolls filled with cheese or ground meat or vegetables.
- Kolokithokeftedes, pumpkin fritters.
- Saganaki, fried kefalograviera cheese.
- Melitzanes tiganites, fried eggplants.
- Bouyiourdi
- Kafteri piperia (hot pepper), grilled or roasted chili pepper served with olive oil and vinegar.
- Lakerda, pickled raw fish that is typically prepared with steaks of mature Atlantic bonito.
- Loutza
- Olives,
- Kolokithakia tiganita, fried cucurbita.
- Koxloi, escargot - also a main course.
- Htapodi ksidato, octopus marinated in vinegar.
- Steamed mussels,
- Omelette,
- Strapatsada, also known as kagianas, scrambled eggs (omelette) with tomato.
- Sfougato, oven-baked omelette with eggs, grated zucchini, scallions (green onions), dill, feta cheese, kefalotyri or other type cheese. With the well-known sfougato from the islands of Mytilene, Santorini, Crete, it is also served as breakfast.
- Kalamarakia tiganita, fried squid slices served with a lemon wedge.
- Dolmades, also known as dolmadakia or sarmadakia, stuffed grape leaves.
- Ofti potato, baked potato with coarse salt, dried oregano and olive oil, served with olives, chopped dried onion and lemon.
- Tomatokeftedes, tomato fritters well known throughout the island of Santorini.
- Staka me ayga (staka with eggs), a Cretan dish consisting of poached or fried eggs and local staka (a type of buttery cream mixed with flour).
- Gigantes plaki or gigandes plaki, baked Greek Gigantes beans with tomato sauce and herbs, also is a main course. The cooking method plaki is a dish cooked in a roasting tin and baked or roasted in the oven with extra-virgin olive oil, tomatoes, vegetables, and herbs.
- Marides tiganites, small-sized whitebait fish (spicara smaris) that are lightly dusted with flour, then fried.
- Skordopsomo, garlic bread made with a combination of sliced bread, olive oil, garlic, salt, pepper, oregano, and basil.
- Garides saganaki, sautéed shrimps that are deglazed with ouzo, then doused in tomato sauce, and topped with crumbled feta.
- Dakos, a traditional Cretan food which features a slice of soaked dried bread or barley rusk (paximadi) topped with chopped tomatoes and crumbled feta or mizithra cheese, dried oregano and a few splashes of olive oil. Dakos is also deemed a salad.
- Sikotakia (livers), fried lamb or chicken, small liver slices with olive oil and oregano. It serves as a main dish known as "Tigania," named after the shallow pan used to cook it (pork, chicken, or lamb).
- Loukaniko (sausage), Greek traditional sausage made from pork or lamb, typically flavored with orange peel, fennel seed, and various other dried herbs and seeds, and sometimes smoked over aromatic woods. They are also often flavored with greens, especially leeks.
- Fava, yellow split peas that are cooked with onions and various spices until they transform into a creamy purée. It is used as a dip or a main course dish, with a Protected Designation of Origin (PDO).
- Tsouknidopita (nettle pie),
- Spanakopita (spinach pie).
- Kimadopita (ground meat pie), also known as Kreatopita.
- Hortopita (greens pie), pie filled with a variety of wild or cultivated greens.
- Pitarakia, mini half-moon-shaped mizithra cheese pies from the island of Milos.
- Kolokithopita (pumpkin pie), savory pie with pumpkin and feta filling which is placed between two layers of phyllo pastry.
- Sfakiani pita or Sfakianopita (Sfakian pie), traditional Cretan pan-fried thin flat pie from Sfakia stuffed with mizithra cheese drizzled with honey and sometimes with sesame seeds. Also served as a dessert.
- Tiropita (cheese pie), pie with Greek feta cheese. Tiropitakia which are mini cheese pies made with phyllo triangles stuffed with Greek feta cheese, are also well-known, and Tiropitakia Kourou which has Kourou dough.
- Piroski or Pirozhki, fried pita with filling of feta cheese or Greek Protected Destination of Origin (PDO) certified kasseri cheese or ground meat or mashed potato or other mixed or plain filling. Served hot. Although mostly eaten in the past, piroski can still be found today in Greece, in specialty shops that sell them exclusively.

== Salads ==
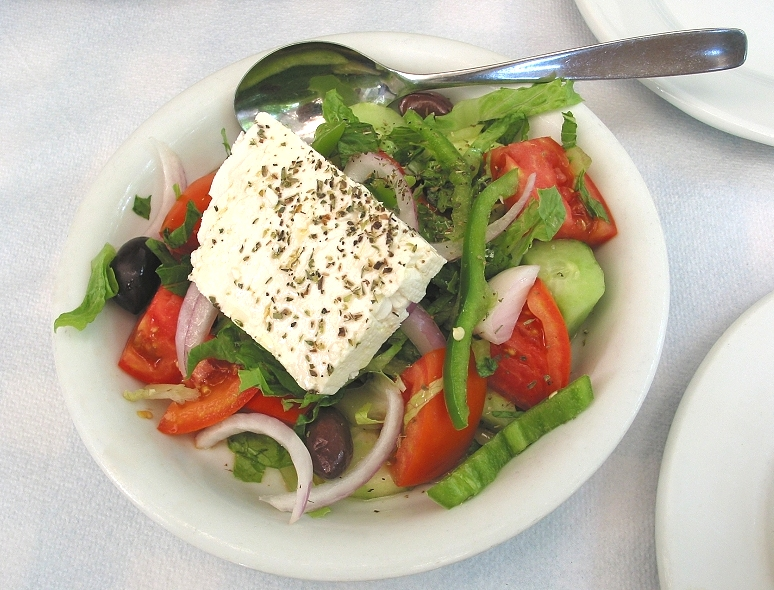
Horiatiki salad

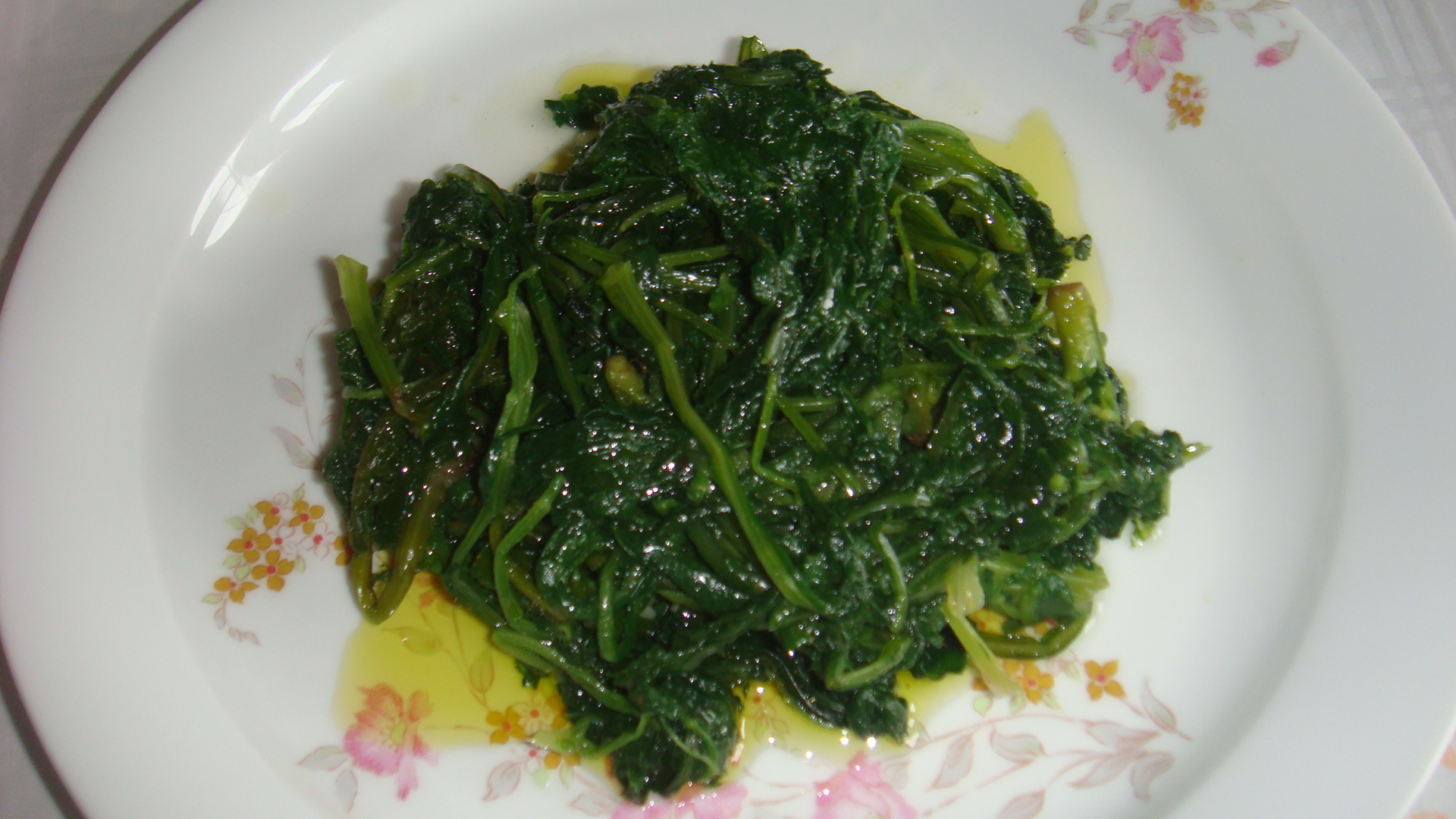
Horta salad

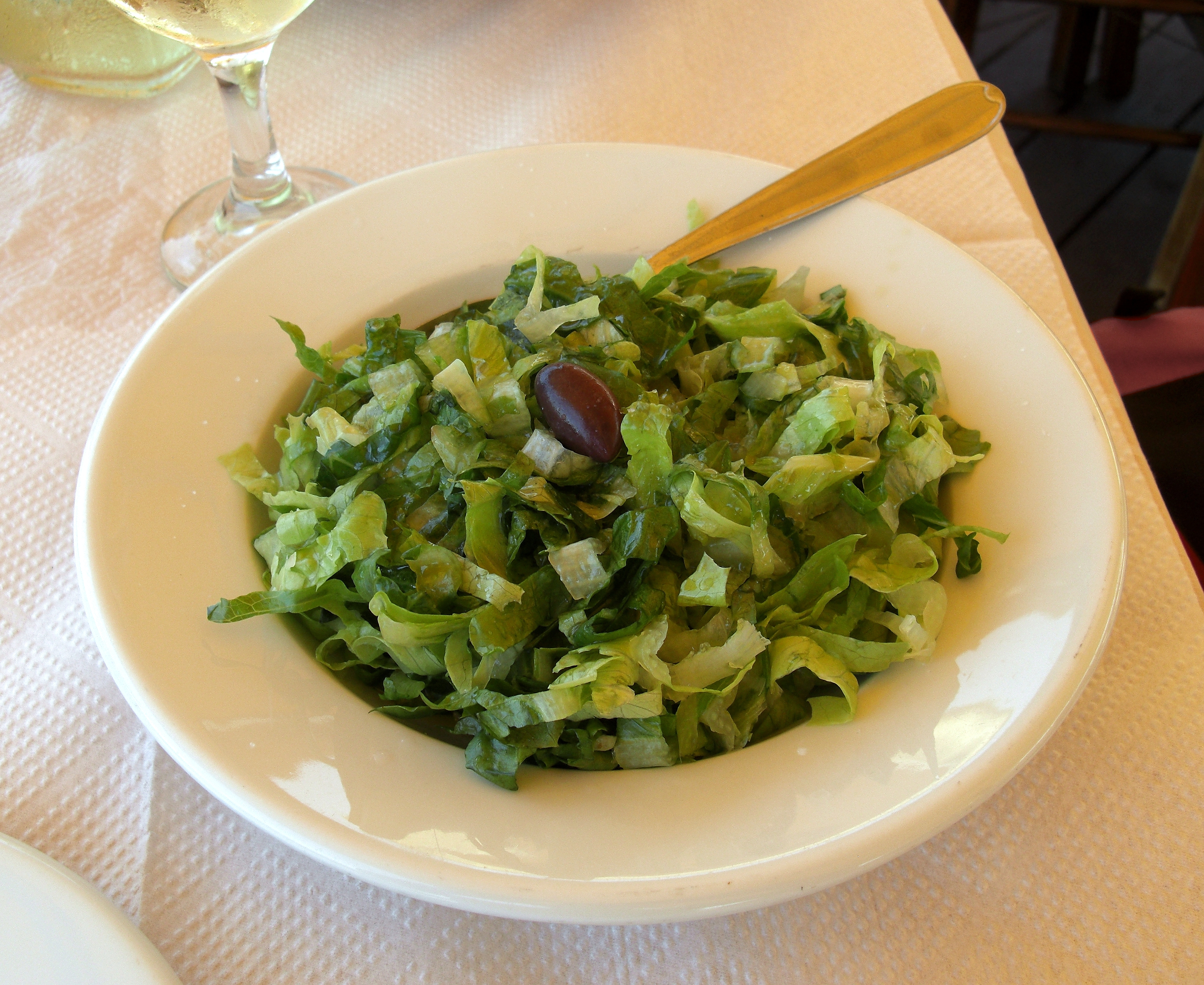
Marouli salad

In Greek cuisine, appetizers are also salads. Selected salads are:

- Horiatiki salad, village's salad, a salad with pieces of tomatoes, cucumbers, onion, feta cheese (usually served as a slice on top of the other ingredients), and olives, dressed with oregano and olive oil.
- Horta salad, greens salad, boiled Greek edible greens dressed with olive oil and fresh lemon juice. The greens used may be antidia (endives), vlita (amaranth greens), myronia (wild chervil), radikia (chicory), seskoula (chard), armyrithra, glistrida, styfnos, zoxos, or asparagus.
- Dakos, or ntakos, traditional Cretan salad and appetizer.
- Pikantiki (also known as politiki), made with white cabbage and purple cabbage finely chopped, pickled Florina peppers, carrot, celery, parsley, finely chopped garlic, lemon juice, white vinegar, olive oil, salt.
- Lahanosalata, cabbage salad, thinly chopped cabbage with salt, olive oil and lemon or vinegar juice.
- Kaparosalata, caper salad.
- Ampelofasoula, cowpea salad.
- Kounoupidi (cauliflower), salad with boiled cauliflower.
- Patatosalata, potato salad with boiled potato.
- Patzarosalata, beet salad with boiled beet.
- Brokolo (broccoli), salad with boiled broccoli.
- Aggouro-ntomata, cucumber with tomato.
- Fasolia mavromatika, black-eyed pea.
- Marouli, lettuce salad.
- Tonosalata, tuna salad.

== Spreads and dips ==
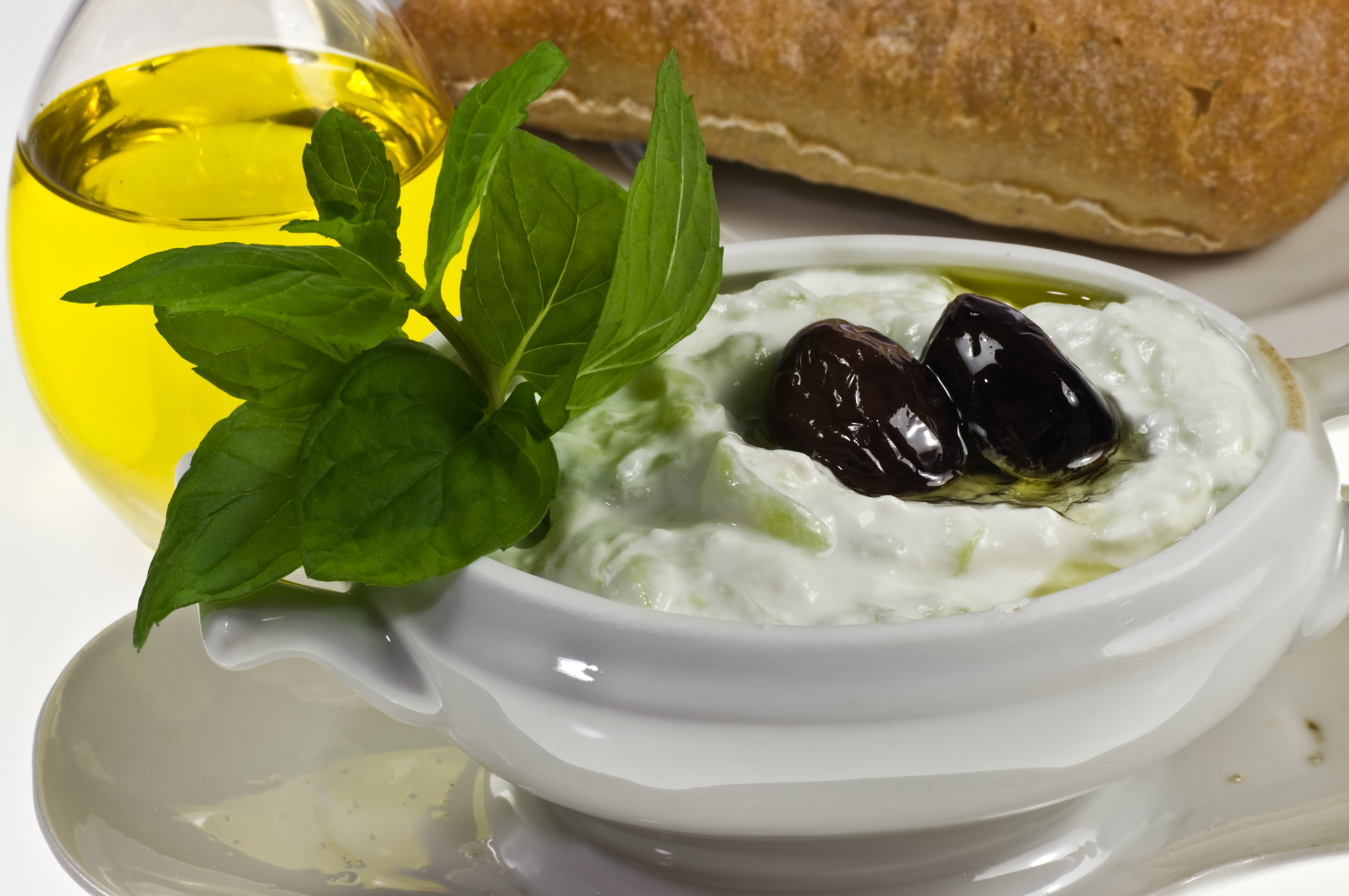
Tzatziki

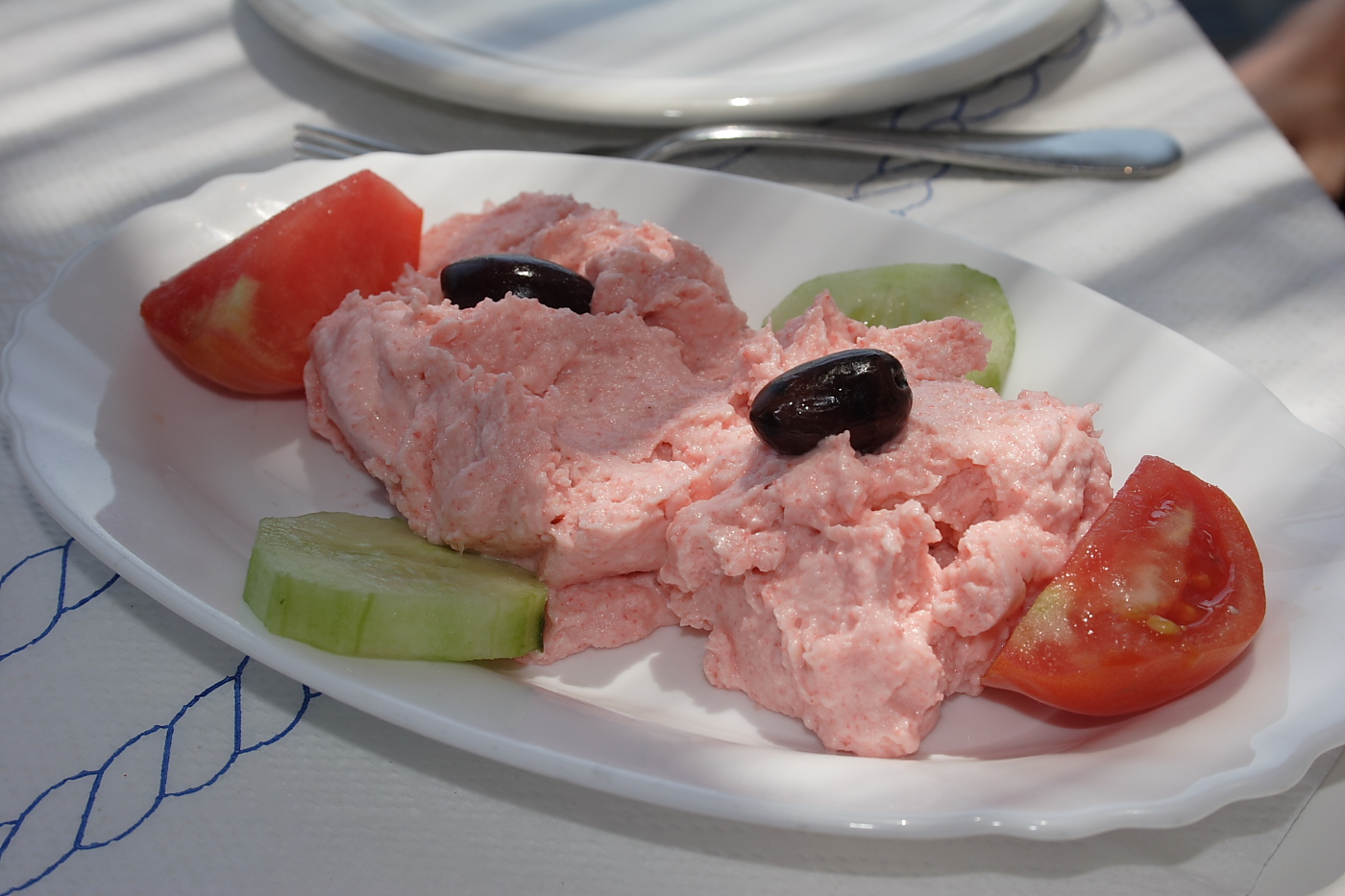
Taramosalata

In the Greek cuisine, appetizers are also the spreads and dips, which also belong to Greek sauces. Selected spreads and dips are:

- Olive paste, tapenade.
- Rosiki, boiled potatoes, carrot, cucumber, mayonnaise, peas.
- Kipourou, gardener's salad, cabbage, carrot, radish, mayonnaise.
- Kopanisti, feta cheese, grilled red sweet peppers, olive oil, fresh garlic.
- Melitzanosalata (eggplant salad), eggplant spread and dip (eggplant salads and appetizers).
- Skordalia, garlic spread and dip from mashed potatoes, olive oil, vinegar, raw garlic.
- Tirokafteri, spread and dip from feta cheese, yogurt, hot peppers, olive oil, and vinegar.
- Paprika, sweet paprika, concentrate tomato paste, roasted red pepper (Florina pepper), feta cheese, olive oil.
- Taramosalata, spread and dip from taramás fish roe mixed with olive oil, lemon juice, and a starchy base of bread or potatoes.
- Feta cheese sauce, creamy sauce made from feta cheese, finely chopped garlic, crushed garlic, olive oil, lemon juice, oregano, thyme.
- Tzatziki, a spread and dip, is made from strained yogurt or diluted yogurt mixed with cucumbers, garlic, salt, olive oil, sometimes with vinegar or lemon juice, and herbs such as dill, mint, parsley and thyme.

== Soups ==
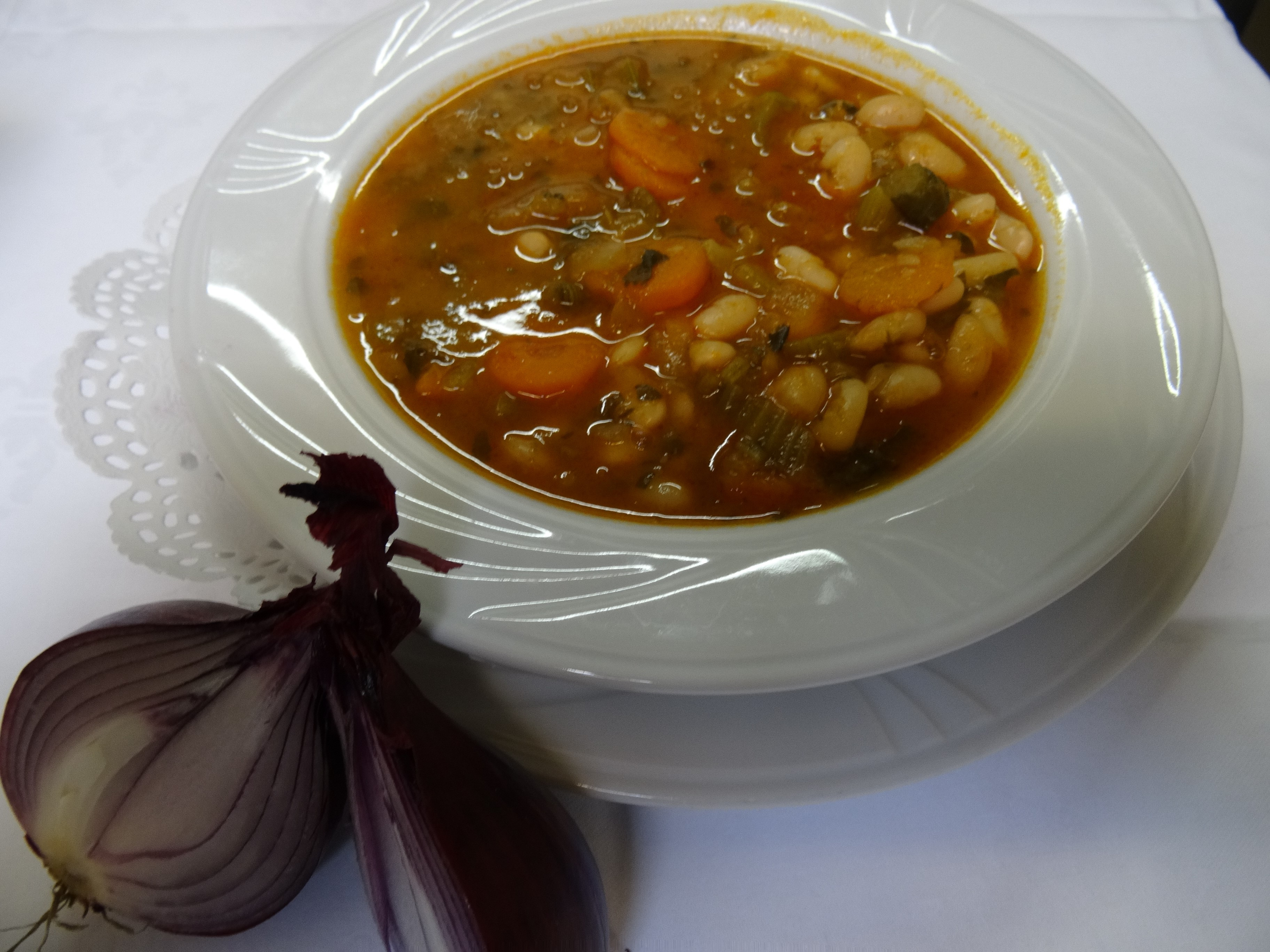
Fasolada soup

Selected soups are:

- Fasolada, a soup of dry white beans, olive oil, and vegetables.
- Fakes, lentil soup.
- Hortosoupa (greens soup), vegetable soup that comes in numerous versions.
- Avgolemono, made with whisked eggs and lemon juice that are combined in a broth. It is also a sauce.
- Youvarlakia, soup from balls of ground meat, rice, finished with avgolemono (the creamy egg and lemon sauce), cooked in a pot.
- Kotosoupa (chicken soup), made from chicken broth, tender chicken cuts, various root vegetables, and rice.
- Kremidosoupa (onion soup),
- Kreatosoupa (meat soup),
- Kakavia, soup made from fish, onions, potatoes, olive oil, and vegetables.
- Kokkinisto kritharaki, also known as manestra soup, made from orzo, onion, tomato sauce, olive oil.
- Magiritsa, thick soup made with lamb offal (intestines, heart, and liver), dill, avgolemono sauce (egg and lemon beaten together), onion and rice, often traditionally eaten on Greek Easter Sunday.
- Ntomatosoupa (tomato soup), with Greek ingredients.
- Patsas, tripe soup made from lamb, sheep, or pork tripe as key ingredients. Most use the animal's head or feet and enrich the broth with garlic, onions, lemon juice, and vinegar.
- Revithosoupa (chickpea soup), also known as revithada.
- Psarosoupa (fish soup),
- Trahanas, tarhana soup.
- Hilos, porridge, it is typically for breakfast.

== Dishes ==
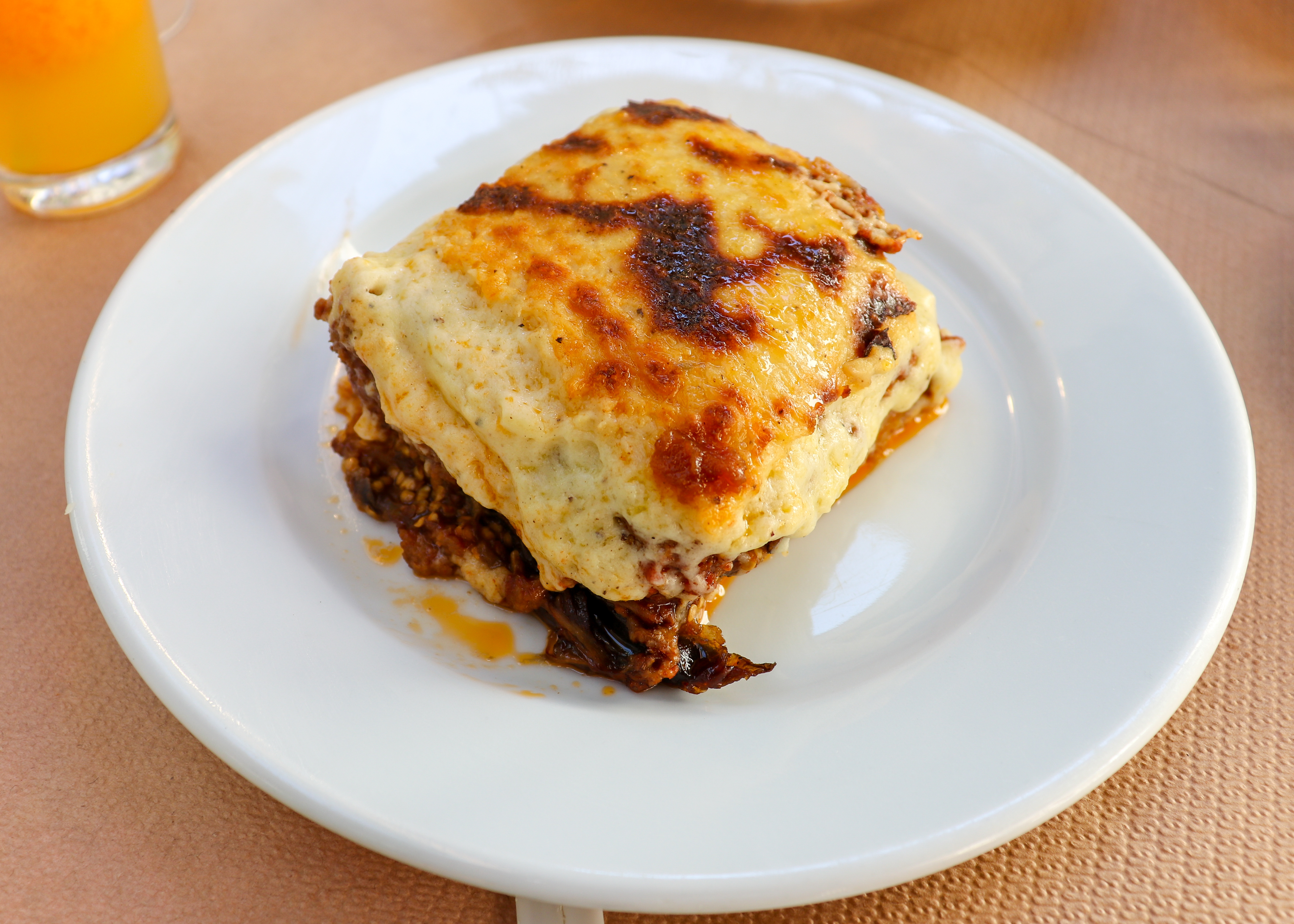
Moussaka

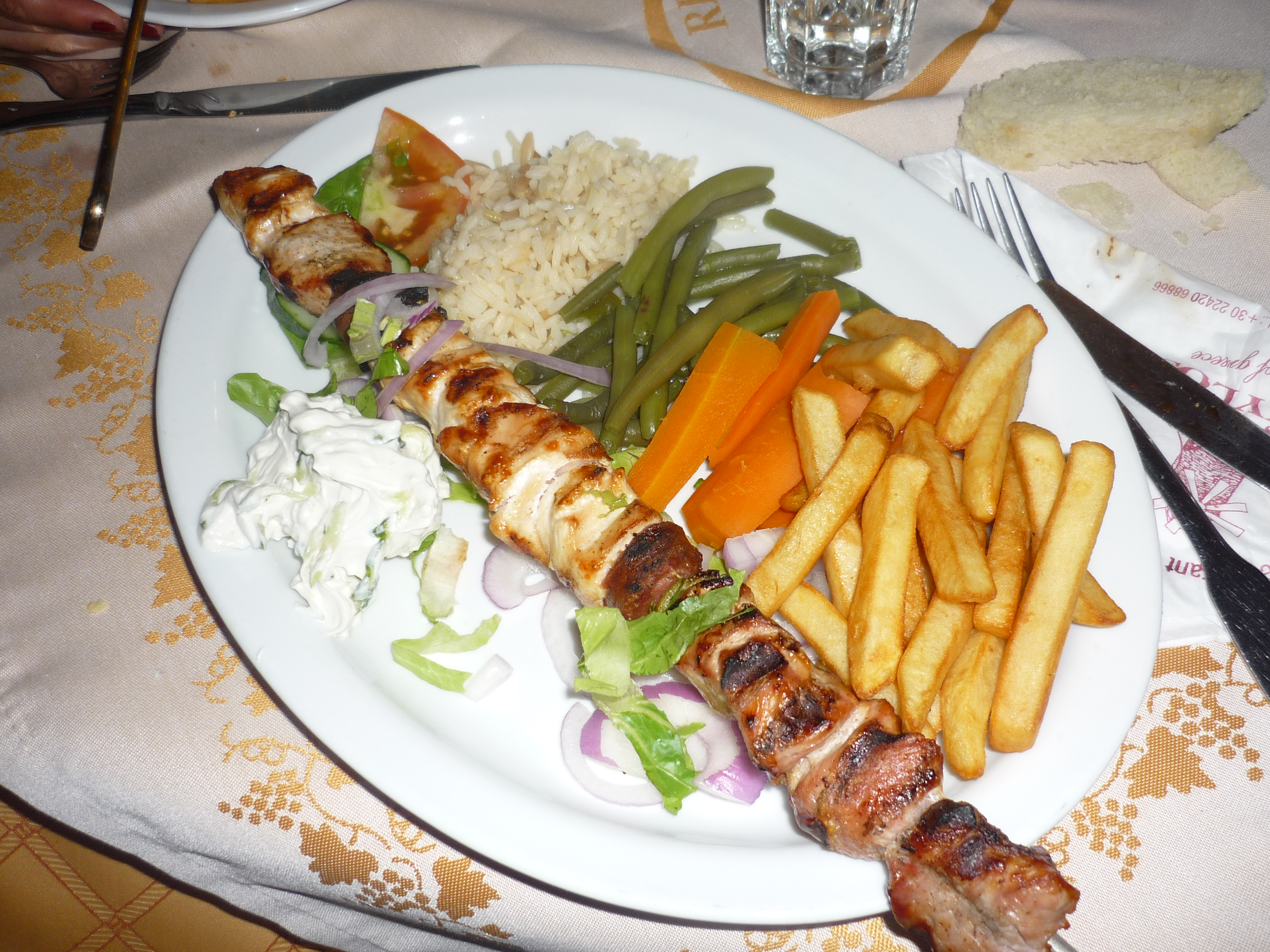
Souvlaki

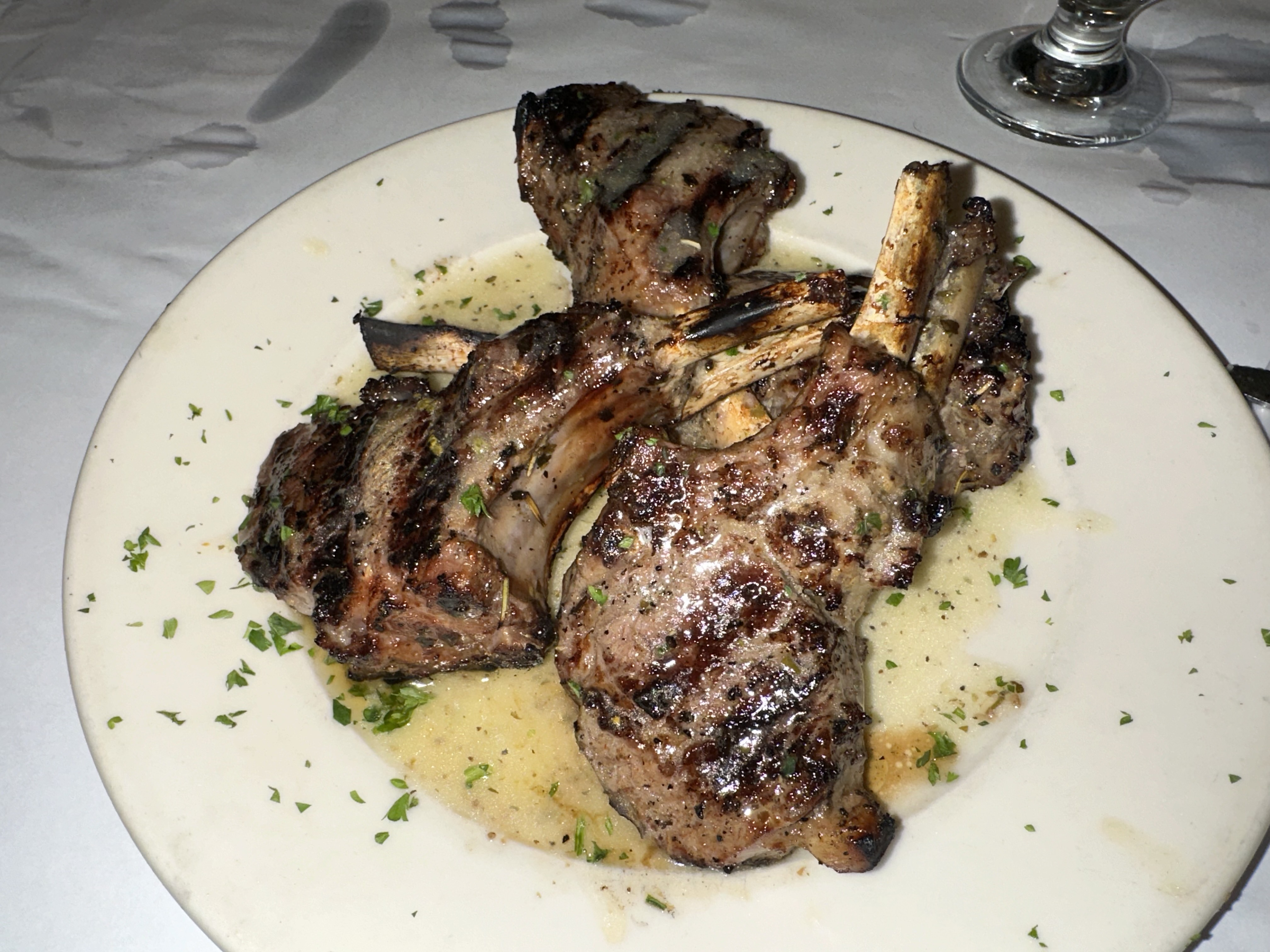
Paidakia

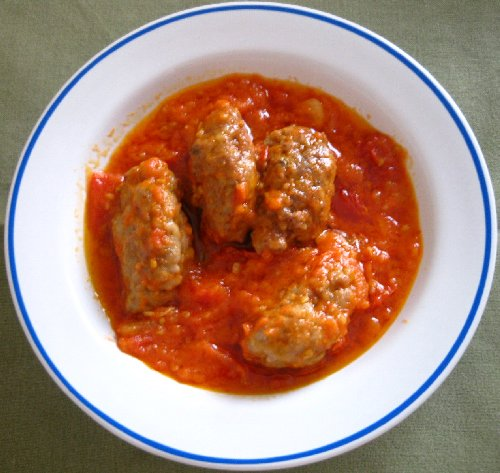
Soutzoukakia smyrneika

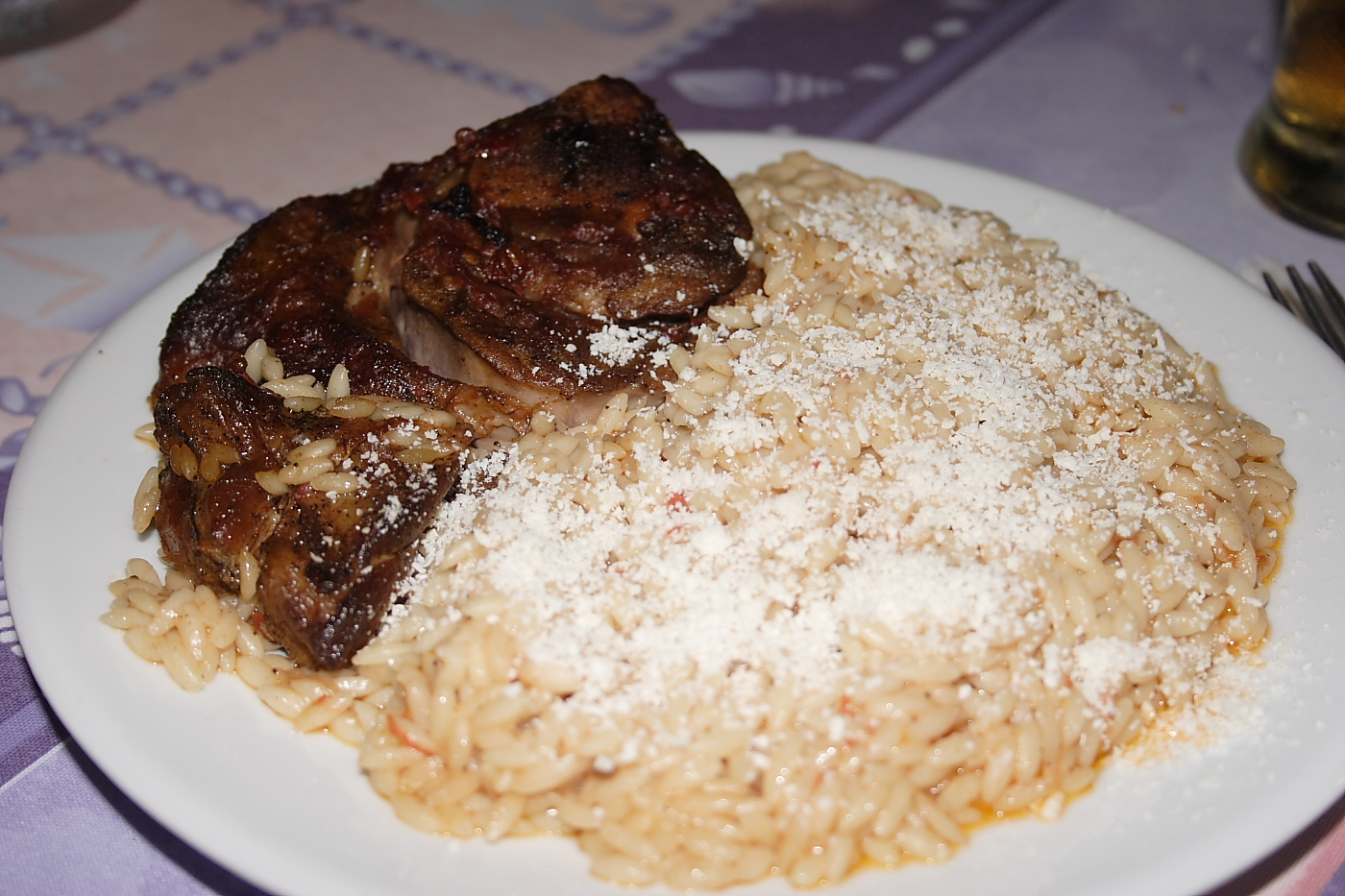
Giouvetsi

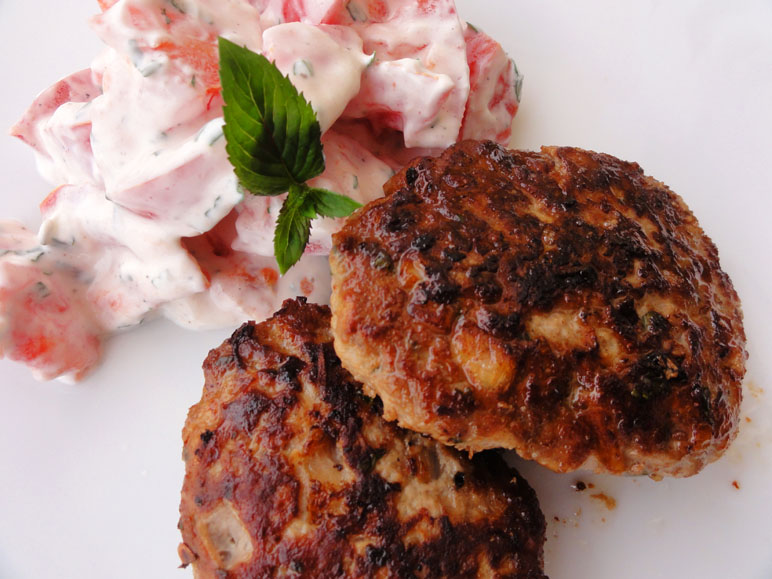
Bifteki burger stuffed with Greek feta cheese

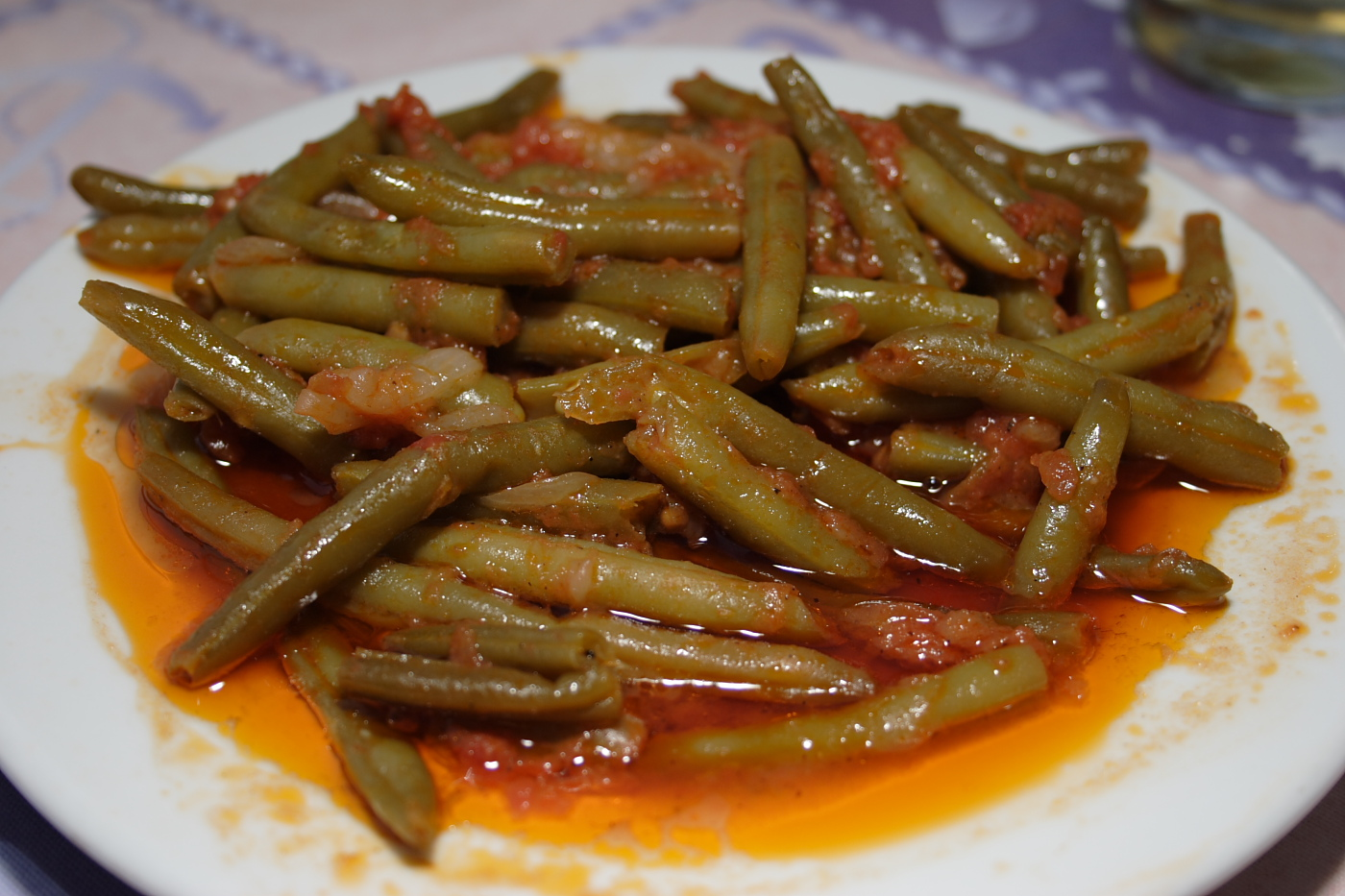
Fasolakia

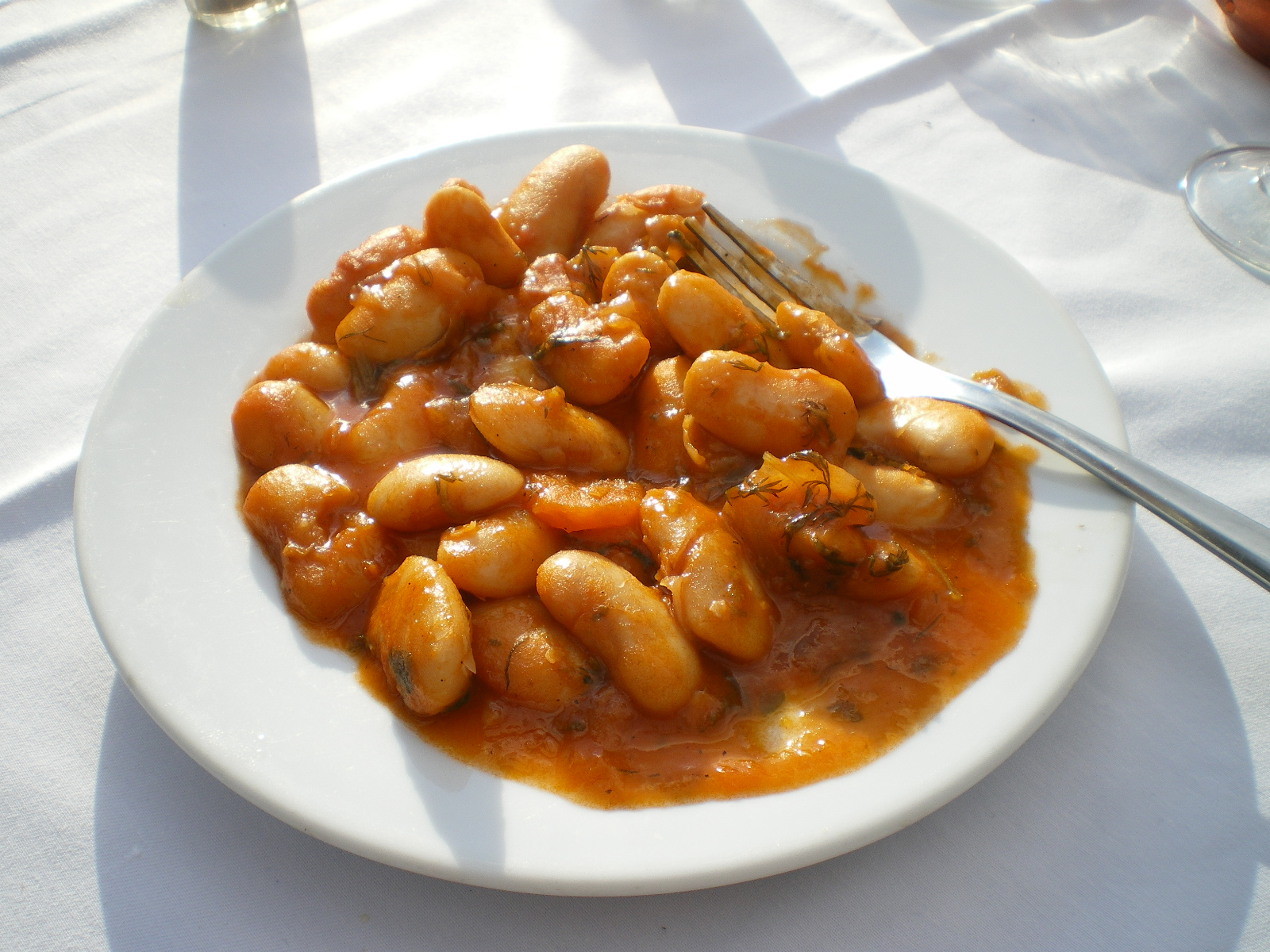
Gigantes plaki

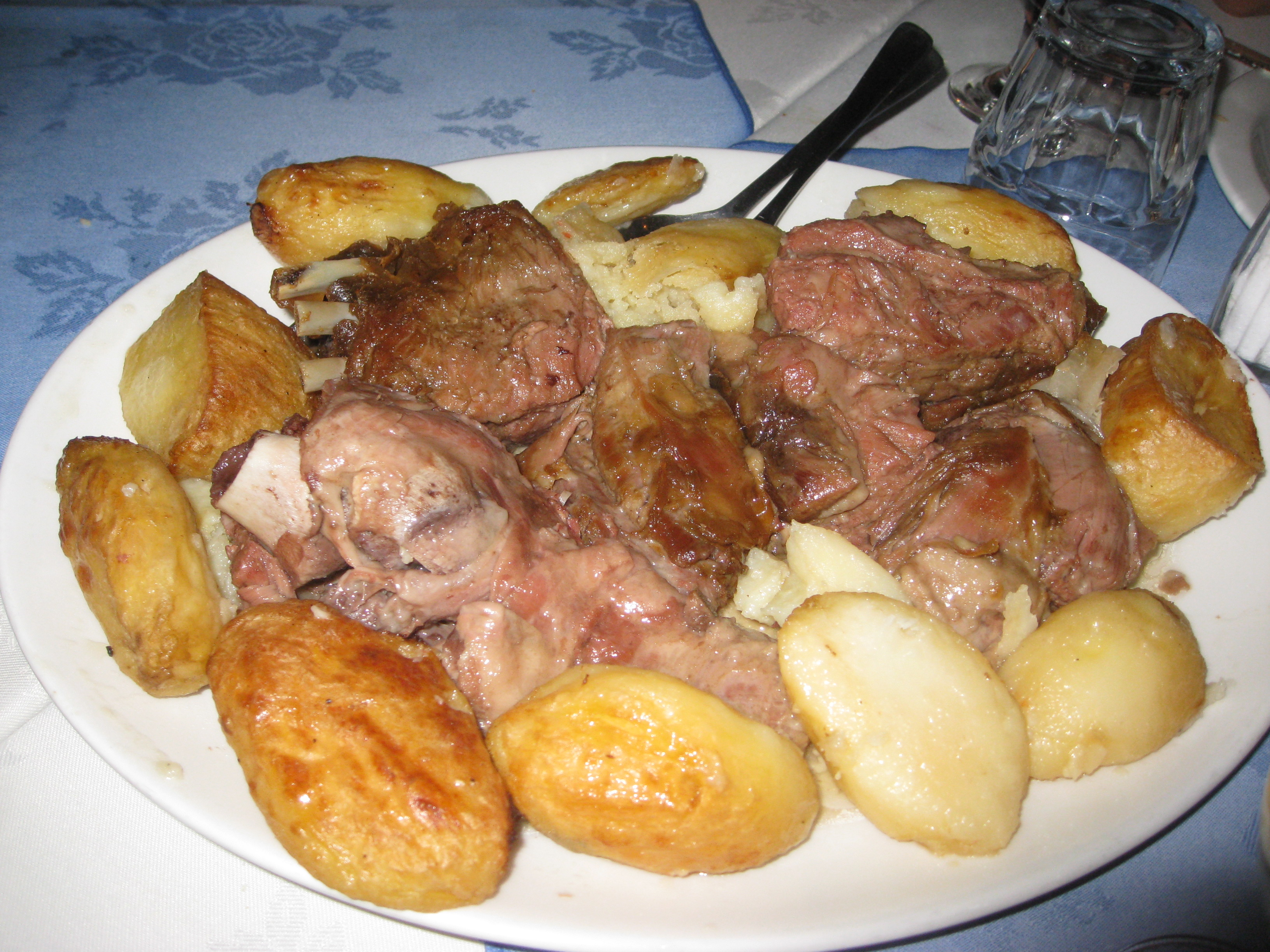
Traditional Greek kleftiko, consisting of lamb marinated with lemon juice, potatoes and spices and cooked slowly in a sealed container.

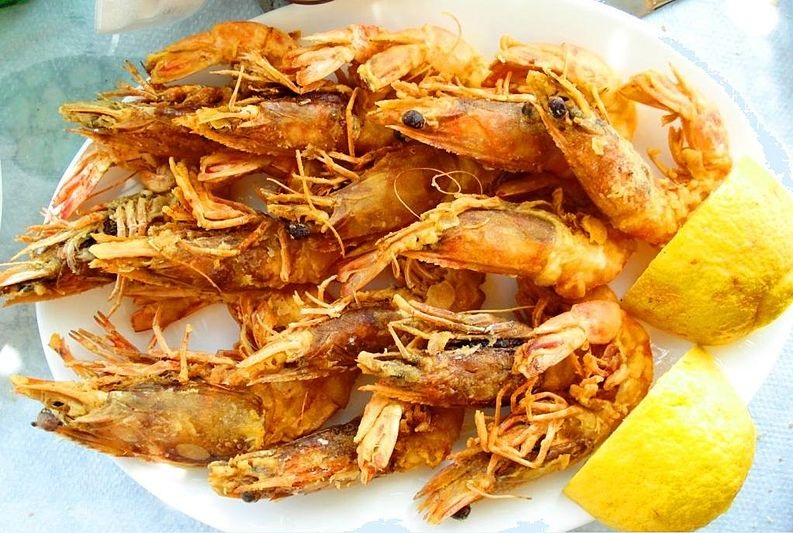
Shrimps

Selected dishes are:

- Agkinares, cardoon has various recipes.
- Antikristo
- Bakaliaros me skordalia
- Fasolakia, green beans that are simmered in olive oil with other vegetable ingredients, belongs to ladera which literally translates to "oily", vegetable dishes cooked in olive oil.
- Arakas (pea), belongs to ladera dishes, with the dish "Arakas me Agkinares".
- Bamies (okra), belongs to ladera dishes.
- Briam, also known as tourlou, belongs to ladera dishes, typically made from eggplants, zucchini, onions, potatoes, tomatoes, garlic, parsley.
- Gemista or Yemista, "filled with" in Greek, baked stuffed bell peppers and tomatoes with rice or ground beef or both, onions, mint, parsley and olive oil.
- Lahanodolmades, baked stuffed light green cabbage rolls with rice or ground beef or both, onions, mint, parsley, avgolemono sauce.
- Lahanorizo, rice and cabbage, onions, fresh herbs, and the optional addition of tomato sauce.
- Prasorizo (leek and rice), made from rice, chopped sweet leeks, olive oil, garlic, dill.
- Spanakorizo (spinach and rice),
- Apaki, cured pork meat. Left to marinate in vinegar for two or three days, the meat is then smoked with aromatic herbs and various spices. Apaki can be cooked on its own or added to other dishes.
- Stifado (stew), casserole cooked with baby onions, tomatoes, wine or vinegar, olive oil, bay leaf, black pepper, meat such as pork, goat, rabbit, wild hare, beef, snails, tripe or octopus.
- Potatoes Yachni, a potato stew, made from potatoes simmered in a tomato sauce with onions, garlic, herbs and spices.
- Pastitsio, baked pasta dish with ground meat and béchamel sauce.
- Astakomakaronada (lobster with spaghetti), lobster meat that is coupled with a flavorful tomato-based sauce and served over pasta.
- Kokkinisto kritharaki, tomato orzo (kritharaki, also known as manestra) stew.
- Makaronia me kima (spaghetti with ground meat),
- Garidomakaronada (shrimps with spaghetti),
- Melitzanes Papoutsakia, baked eggplants stuffed with ground beef and topping it with a smooth béchamel sauce. The dish is called papoutsakia (little shoes) because of its shape.
- Kolokithakia gemista (stuffed zucchini), zucchini stuffed with rice and sometimes meat and cooked on the stovetop or in the oven.
- Spetsofai, made with spicy country sausages, sweet peppers, onion, garlic, olive oil, in a rich tomato sauce.
- Giouvetsi, pieces of lamb (or beef) and small noodles such as orzo, all cooked together in a tomato sauce with garlic and oregano.
- Gyros, pork meat or chicken cooked on a vertical rotisserie, onions, tomato, lettuce, fried potatoes, sauces like tzatziki rolled in a pita bread.
- Gournopoula
- Gogges (also called goggizes or gogglies), a type of egg-free pasta made in the Peloponnese, especially in Argolis and Laconia.
- Hilopites, traditional Greek pasta made from flour, eggs, milk, and salt, with the well known the hilopites Matsata.
- Pastitsada,
- Bourdeto,
- Sofigado, rabbit giouvetsi (stew) from the island of Kefalonia.
- Sofrito, beef rump lightly fried with plenty of garlic and velvety sauce, from the island of Corfu.
- Skepasti
- Soufiko, a vegetable stew made by slow cooking bell peppers, squash, eggplants and tomatoes with olive oil and herbs from the island of Ikaria.
- Mastelo, roast lamb from the island of Sifnos.
- Roasted chicken with potatoes or rice,
- Kleftiko, slow-roasted leg of lamb or lamb shoulder wrapped in parchment paper with potatoes, bell peppers, onions, feta cheese, marinated with olive oil, lemon juice, garlic, fresh rosemary and herbs.
- Mousakas, also known as moussaka, sliced tender eggplant cut lengthwise, or potato-based, lamb ground meat, topped with a thick layer of béchamel sauce.
- Moshari kokkinisto, stewed veal meat, onions, garlic, olive oil, tomato sauce, served accompanied by basmati rice, or pasta or potatoes or potato purée. Kokkinisto is cooking meat or pasta, usually beef, pork, poultry, orzo, braised in tomato sauce.
- Kreatopita
- Keftedakia, meat fritters, fried meatballs from lean ground beef with eggs, onions, garlic, parsley, mint, it also make them using half ground beef and half ground pork. A well-known version is the shish kiofte (also known as kofta kebab) made from lamb.
- Kontosouvli
- Giaourtlou lamp kebab or Yiaourtlou lamp kebab, traditional recipe from Asia Minor and Constantinople made from spicy ground lamb kofta kebab, yogurt sauce, tomato sauce.
- Soutzoukakia, oblong shaped meatballs made with beef ground meat or mixed (beef, pork, lamp) or chicken.
- Staka me auga
- Soutzoukakia Smyrneika (Smyrna meatballs), oblong shaped beef meatballs made with cumin and cinnamon, then simmered in a rich tomato sauce.
- Biftekia, Greek-version burger patties made with a combination of ground pork, beef, or lamb, and the meat is mixed with onions, breadcrumbs, eggs, parsley leaves finely chopped and oregano. They can be grilled, baked, or fried.
- Arni souvlas, whole lamb on the spit baked with rotisserie (electric- or gas-powered heating rotisserie) or over flaming charcoals (barbecue), specifically following the culinary tradition on Greek Orthodox Easter Sunday.
- Arnaki sto fourno me patates (oven-baked lamb with potatoes),
- Katsikaki ston fourno (oven-baked goat),
- Paidakia, ribs, with the well-known lamb chops.
- Gida vrasti (boiled goat),
- Hirino me selino, pork meat with celery.
- Souvlaki, often eaten with pita.
- Kontosouvli,
- Souvla, large pieces of meat cooked on a long skewer over flaming charcoals (barbecue). It is also a cooking technique for meat. Antikrigia or Antikristo is a traditional technique of cooking meat on the island of Crete.
- Kokoretsi, a dish consisting of lamb or goat intestines wrapped around seasoned offal, including sweetbreads, hearts, lungs, or kidneys, and grilled.
- Tigania, pan-fried pork or chicken. The name "tigania" refers to the shallow pan in which the meal is cooked.
- Fagri sti schara (red porgy on the grill),
- Gavros tiganitos (fried anchovy),
- Garides saganaki
- Gopes tiganites (fried boops boops),
- Bakaliaros (merluccius merluccius), cod fish, the most well-known recipe is of fried bakaliaros mainly served with skordalia dip and fried potatoes.
- Soupies (cuttlefish),
- Xiphias or Xifias, a species of swordfish.

== Desserts and pastries ==
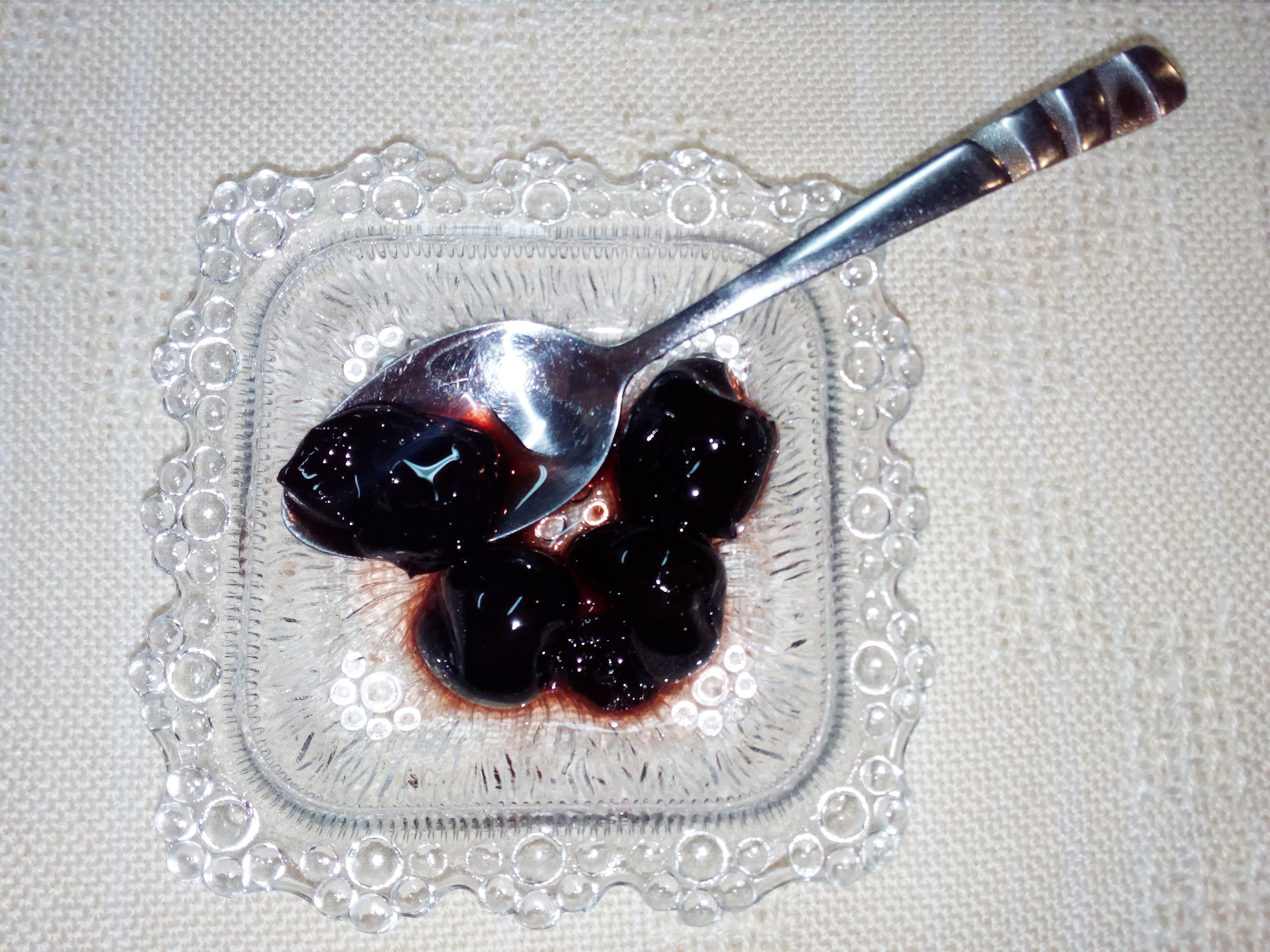
Spoon sweet sour cherry

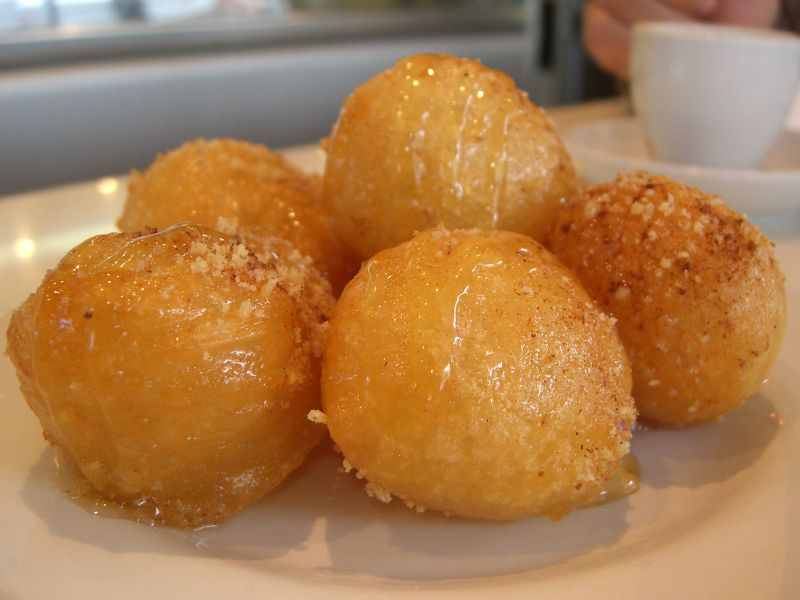
Loukoumades

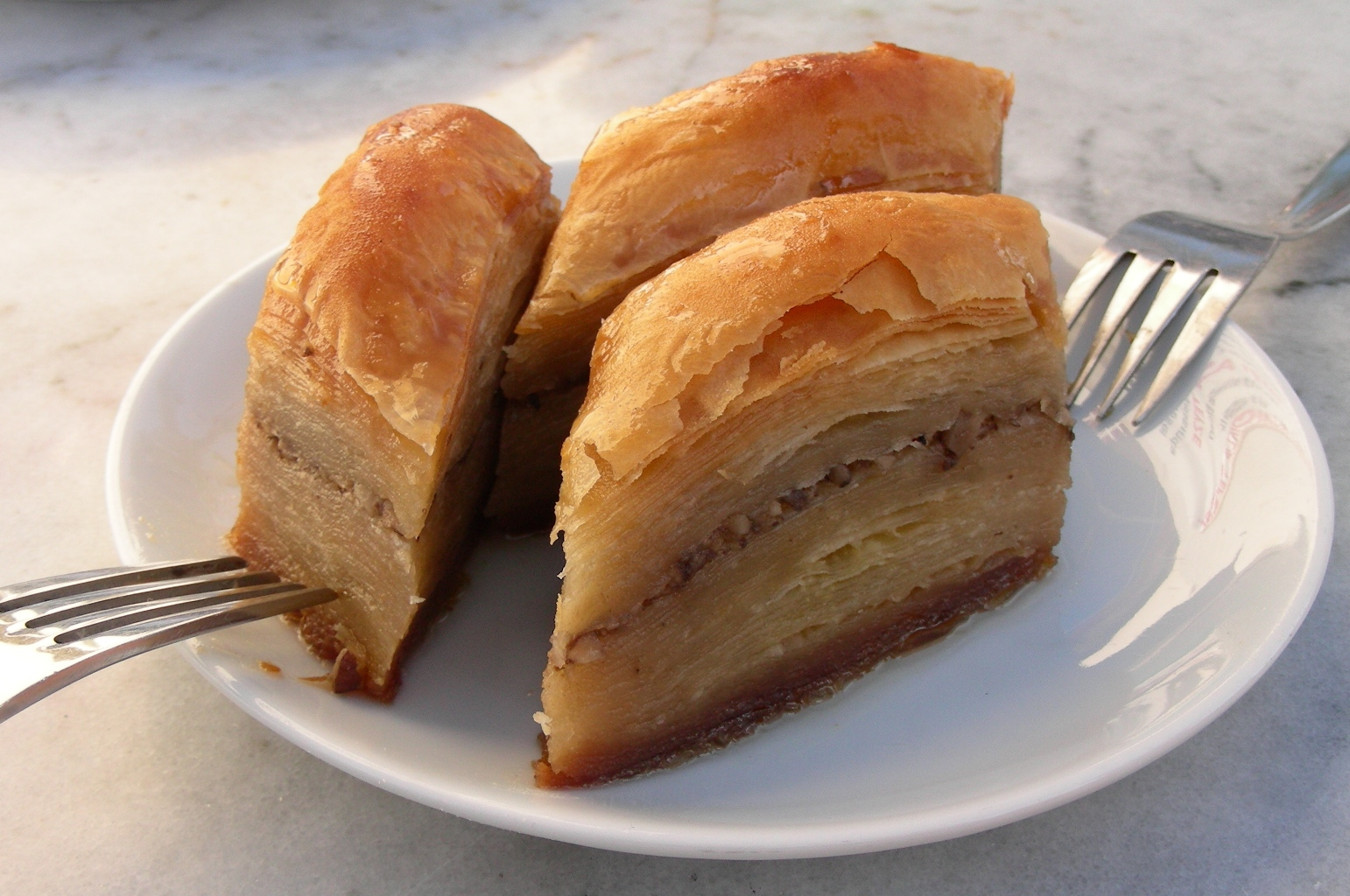
Baklava

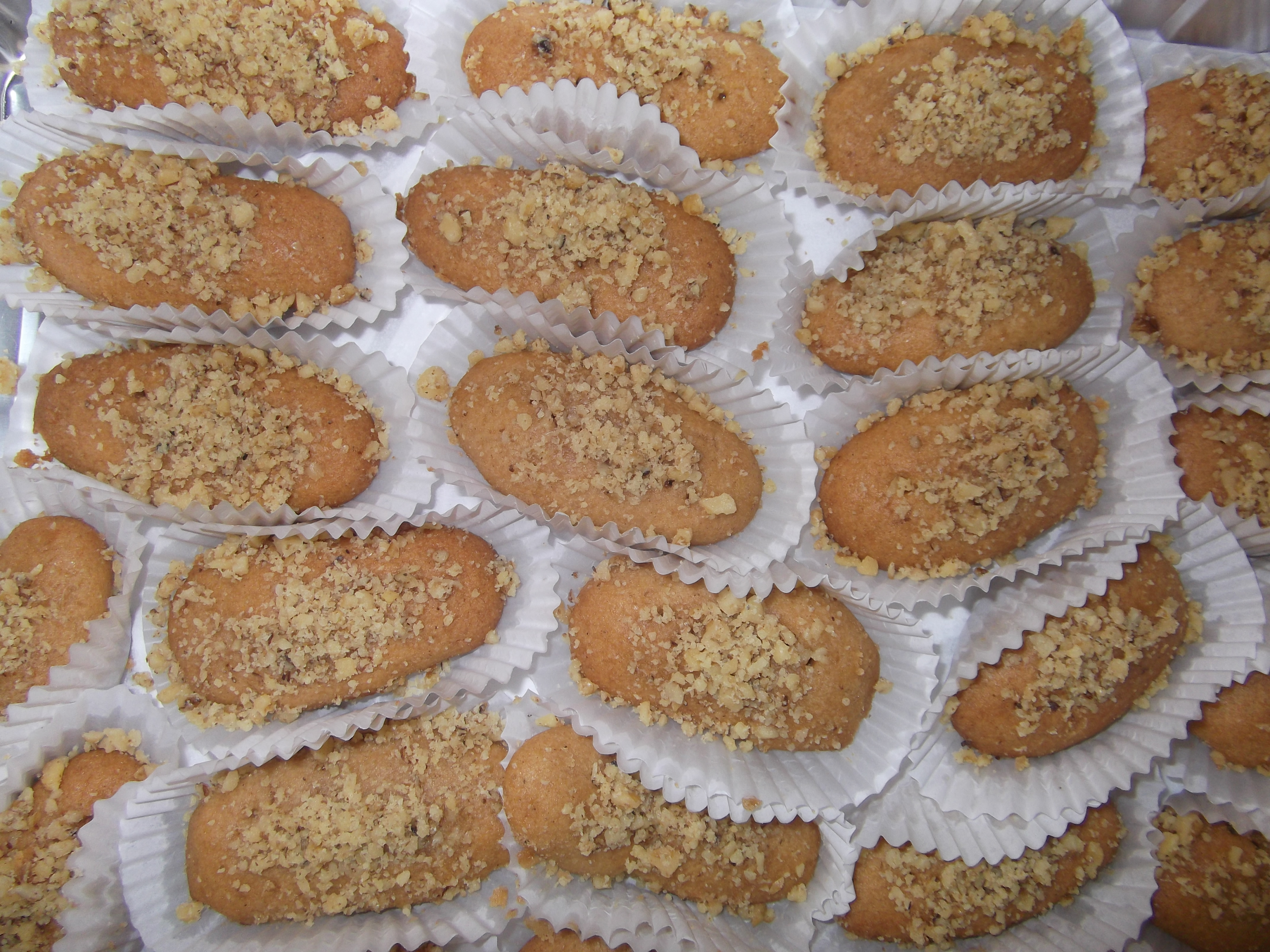
Melomakarona

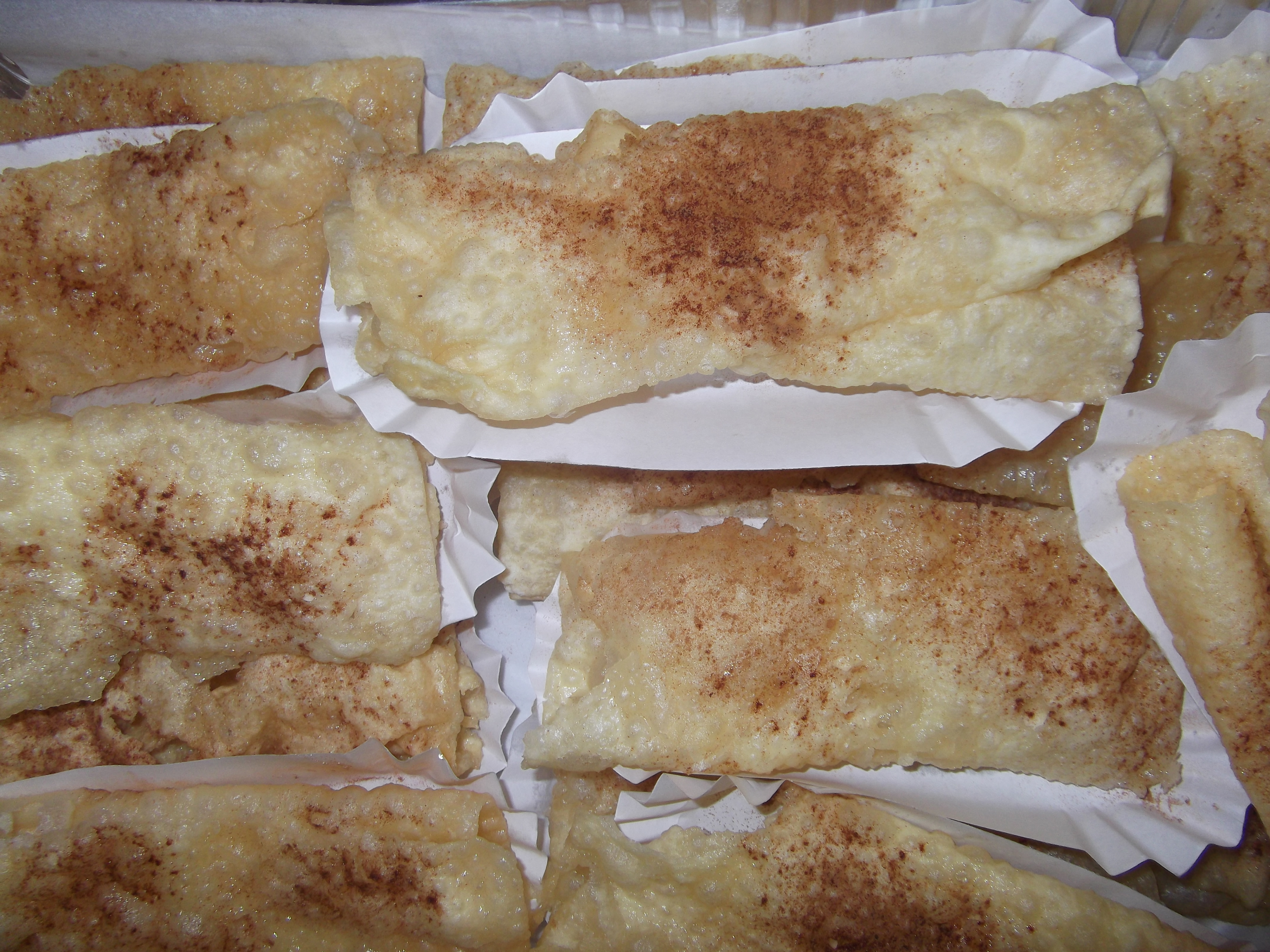
Diples

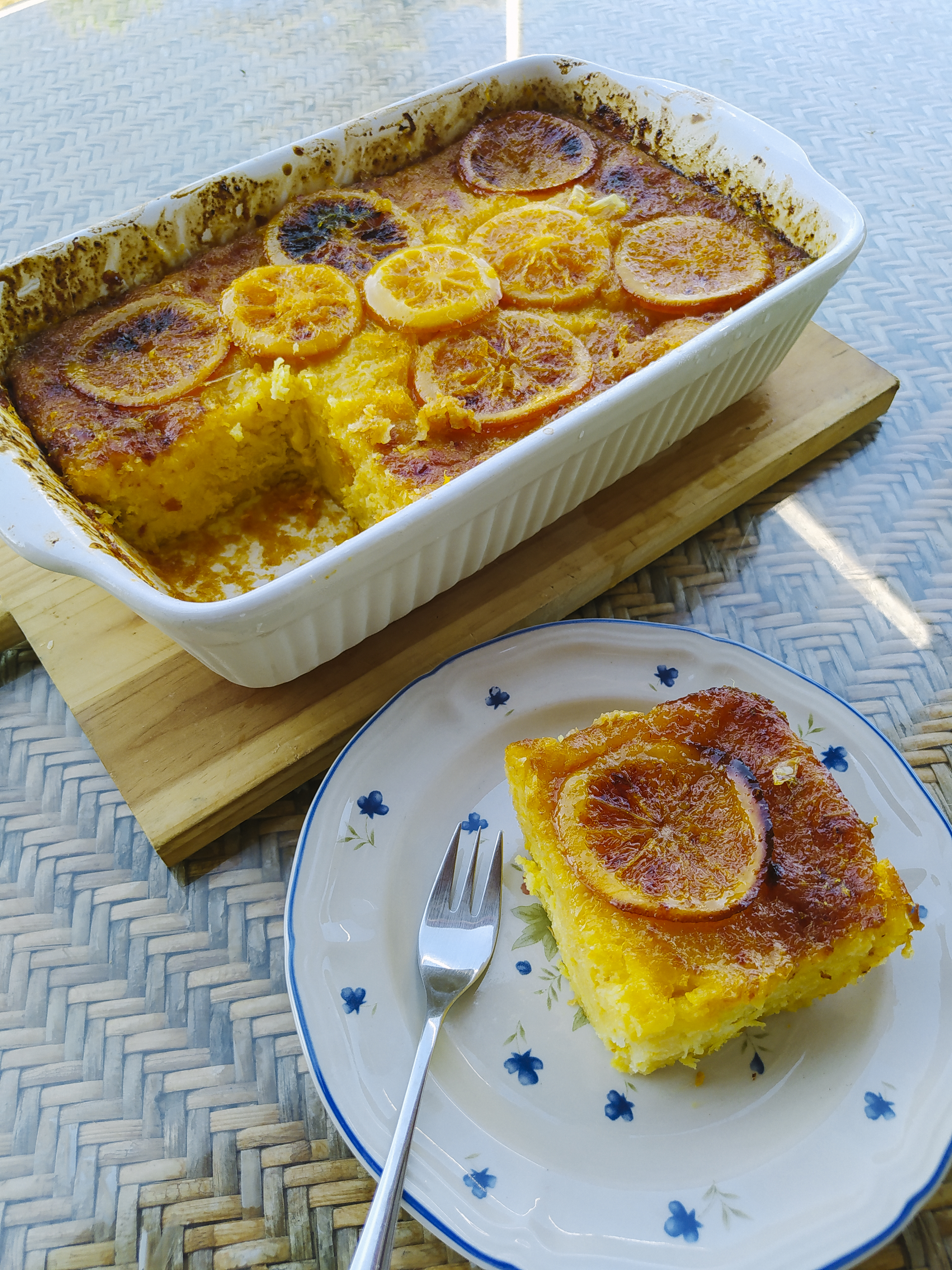
Portokalopita

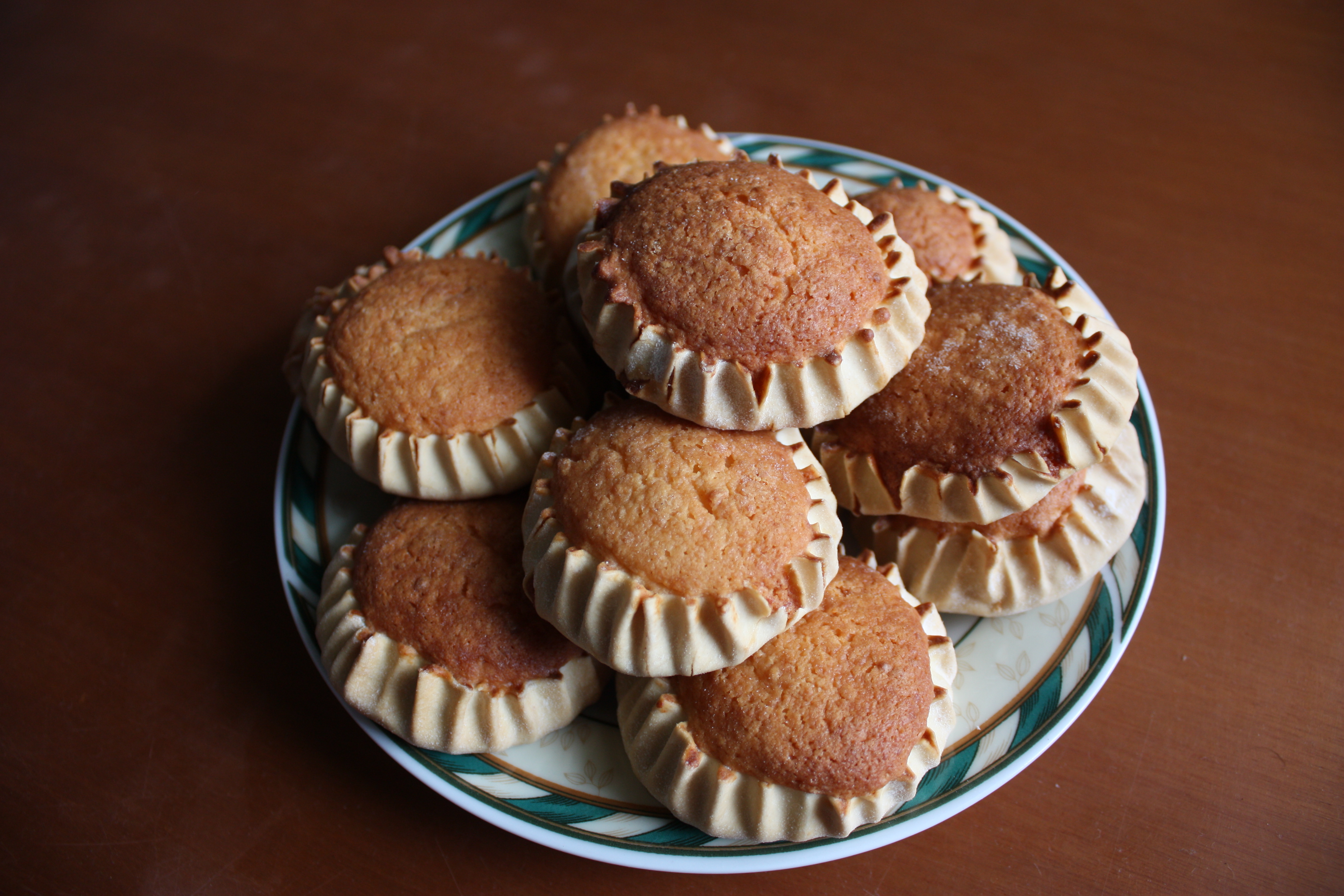
Melitinia

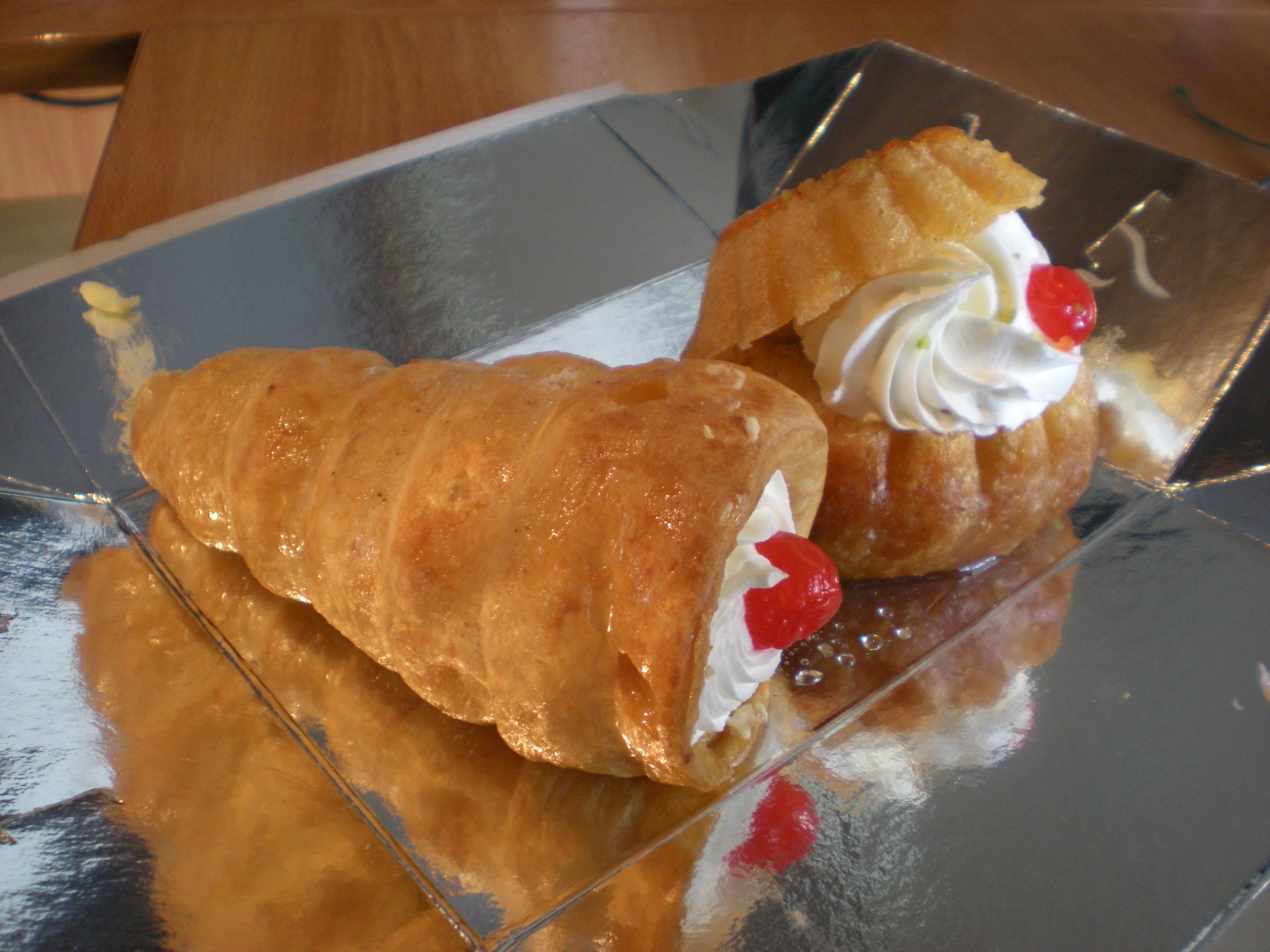
Korne and babas

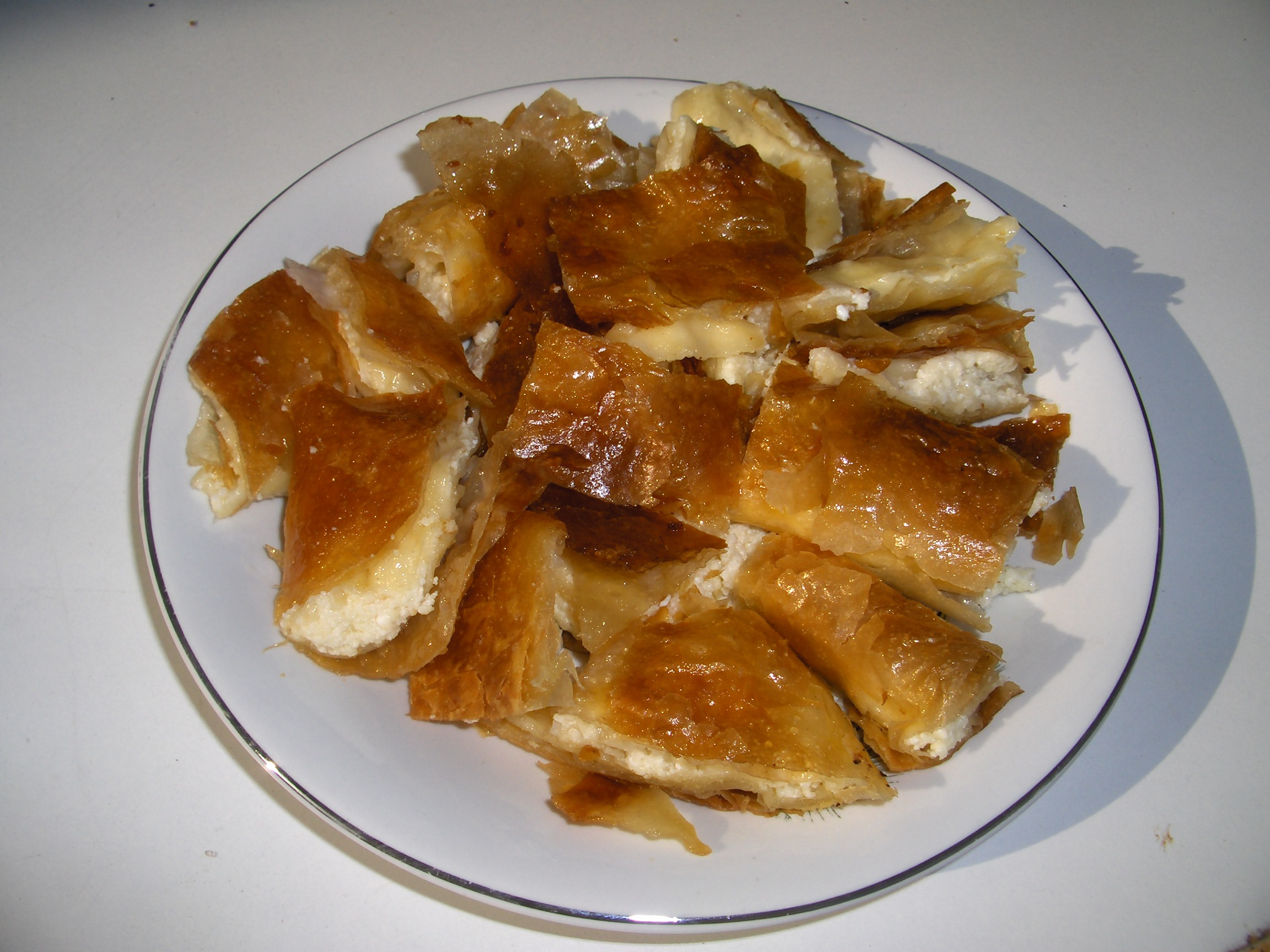
Bougatsa

Selected desserts and pastries (sweet and savory) are:

- Amygdalopita (almond pie), almond cake made with ground almonds, flour, butter, eggs and pastry cream.
- Amygdalota,a traditional sweet which has several versions made from almonds, sugar and flower water.
- Amygdalota Axladakia, from the island of Syros.
- Akanés, from Serres.
- Armenonville, from Thessaloniki.
- Ashure, also known as varvara.
- Avgato, a spoon sweet of plum from the island of Skopelos.
- Akoumia, a traditional dessert type of loukouma (donut) that is prepared on the island of Symi.
- Baklava,
- Babas, rum baba.
- Gianniotikos Balkavas, type of Baklava from Ioannina.
- Galaktoboureko
- Galatopita
- Giaourtopita (yogurt pie), yogurt cake with syrup.
- Bougatsa krema (bougatsa cream),
- Copenhagen, cake made of two layers of filo, syrup, spread with butter, with a cream filling in between.
- Fanouropita,
- Frigania, from the island of Zakynthos.
- Fritoura, from the island of Zakynthos.
- Flogeres,
- Melomakarona, also known as finikia.
- Masourakia, from the island of Chios
- Galaktoboureko, custard cake with syrup.
- Galatopita (milk pie), milk cake.
- Halvadopita (halva pie), nougat pie.
- Hamalia, a traditional dessert from the islands of Skiathos, Alonnisos and Skopelos.
- Kalitsounia or Lychnarakia, from the island of Crete.
- Karydopita (walnut pie), walnut cake.
- Karpouzopita (watermelon pie), watermelon cake from the island of Milos.
- Kolokythopita (pumpkin pie), sweet pie with yellow or red pumpkin.
- Krema (cream), a traditional custard sweet made with vanilla, chocolate and yogurt.
- Koliva, boiled wheat kernels, honey, sesame seeds, walnuts, raisins, anise, almonds, pomegranate seeds, with powdered sugar on top. It is used as a ritual dish in the Eastern Orthodox Church, mostly prepared for commemorations of the dead, funerals, and memorials.
- Koufeto,
- Koufeto, known as Koufeto of Milos, spoon sweet from the island of Milos.
- Kouvanezes, sponge cake rolls with chocolate cream from the island of Syros.
- Koulourakia,
- Kourampiedes,
- Kydonopasto,
- Korne, Greek cream-filled puff pastry cone.
- Kopenchagi
- Loukoumi,
- Masourakia, from the island of Chios.
- Melekouni, from the island of Rhodes.
- Muhallebi or Mahallebi.
- Moustalevria,
- Moustokouloura, grape must cookies.
- Mpezedes, also known as mareges.
- Mandola, almond candy from the island of Corfu.
- Mosaiko (mosaic), also known as kormos or salami.
- Mamoulia, traditional cookies from the islands of Chios and Crete.
- Melitinia, a traditional dessert from the island of Santorini made from sweet cheese, sugar, eggs, a hint of mastic.
- Misokofti, a traditional pudding-like dessert type of mustalevria from the island of Symi that's made with a combination of ripe fragosika (prickly pear) pulp, niseste (corn starch), and sugar.
- Negrakia
- Pasteli, sesame seed candy made from sesame seeds, sugar, or honey pressed into a bar.
- Loukoumades, fried balls of dough that are often spiced with cinnamon and drizzled with honey.
- Fouskakia, a version of loukoumades from the island of Skopelos.
- Diples, pastry sheets that are rolled, deep-fried, and doused or drizzled with a thick, honey-based syrup.
- Pastafrola, also well known as pasta flora.
- Patouda, cookies from the island of Crete combine flaky dough with a sweet nut-based filling.
- Petimezopita (petimezi pie), grape syrup cake.
- Rizogalo,
- Roxakia,
- Serrano cake
- Sfoliatsa, from the island of Syros.
- Stafidopsomo (raisin bread),
- Sousamopita (sesame pie), sesame cake with syrup.
- Sfakianopita
- Sykomaida, from the island of Corfu. Its a fig cake made from dried figs, ground almonds or walnuts, ouzo, cinnamon, cloves, and fennel seeds. In 2009, sykomaida was recognized by the European Union as a Protected Designation of Origin (PDO) product
- Sokolatopita (chocolate pie), chocolate cake with syrup.
- Spatoula, from Kalabaka, walnut cake with diplomat cream.
- Samsades, a traditional dessert from the island of Limnos consisting of filo (phyllo dough) that's rolled around a filling of nuts, baked, and then drenched in sugar or honey syrup, thyme honey, or grape must (petimezi).
- Sykomaida, a traditional dessert of fig cake from the island of Corfu made from dried figs, ground almonds or walnuts, ouzo, cinnamon, cloves, and fennel seeds.
- Poniro,
- Spoon sweets,
- Quince paste,
- Rovani, from the island of Ithaca.
- Rodini, small rolls of marzipan that are wrapped with a layer of wiped cream and on their center have a whole cherry.
- Tiganita, also known as laggita, very thin tiganita is a Greek-style Crêpe, thicker and fluffier tiganita is a Greek-style Pancake.
- Tsoureki,
- Trigona panoramatos
- Vasilopita, Greek New Year's cake with a coin or a trinket baked inside of it.
- Yogurt mousse, mousse made from sheep's yoghurt.
- Strained yogurt with honey, walnuts often added.
- Komposta, made from peach, apple, pear or other fruits.
- Halvas with tahini,
- Halvas with semolina,
- Halvas sapoune, also known as jelly halva.
- Kariokes, small sized walnut-filled chocolates and shaped like crescents.
- Kantaifi,
- Kiounefe,
- Kok, similar to a French macaron, made as large one or smaller typically served multiple.
- Kazan Dibi,
- Revani,
- Cretan Kserotigano, sweet fritter from the island of Crete.
- Patsavouropita, traditional filo pie sweet with a custard or savory with cheese filling.
- Portokalopita (orange pie), orange cake with syrup.
- Milopita (apple pie), apple cake.
- Melopita (honey pie), honey cheesecake, traditionally associated with the island of Sifnos.
- Saliaroi or Saliaria, from Kozani.
- Samali, extra syrupy Greek semolina cake with mastic.
- Trigona Panoramatos, from the Panorama, Thessaloniki.
- Touloumba or Tulumba
- Ypovrihio or Ypovrichio, which means submarine in Greek, also known as vanilia or mastiha, is a white chewy sweet that is served on a spoon dipped in a tall glass of cold water.
- Venizelika
- Fetoydia,
- Venizelika, from the island of Limnos.
- Zoumero, chocolate cake originating from Chania made with flour, baking powder, eggs, vanilla, and cocoa powder.
- Candied fruits,
- Dried fruits,

== Drinks and beverages ==
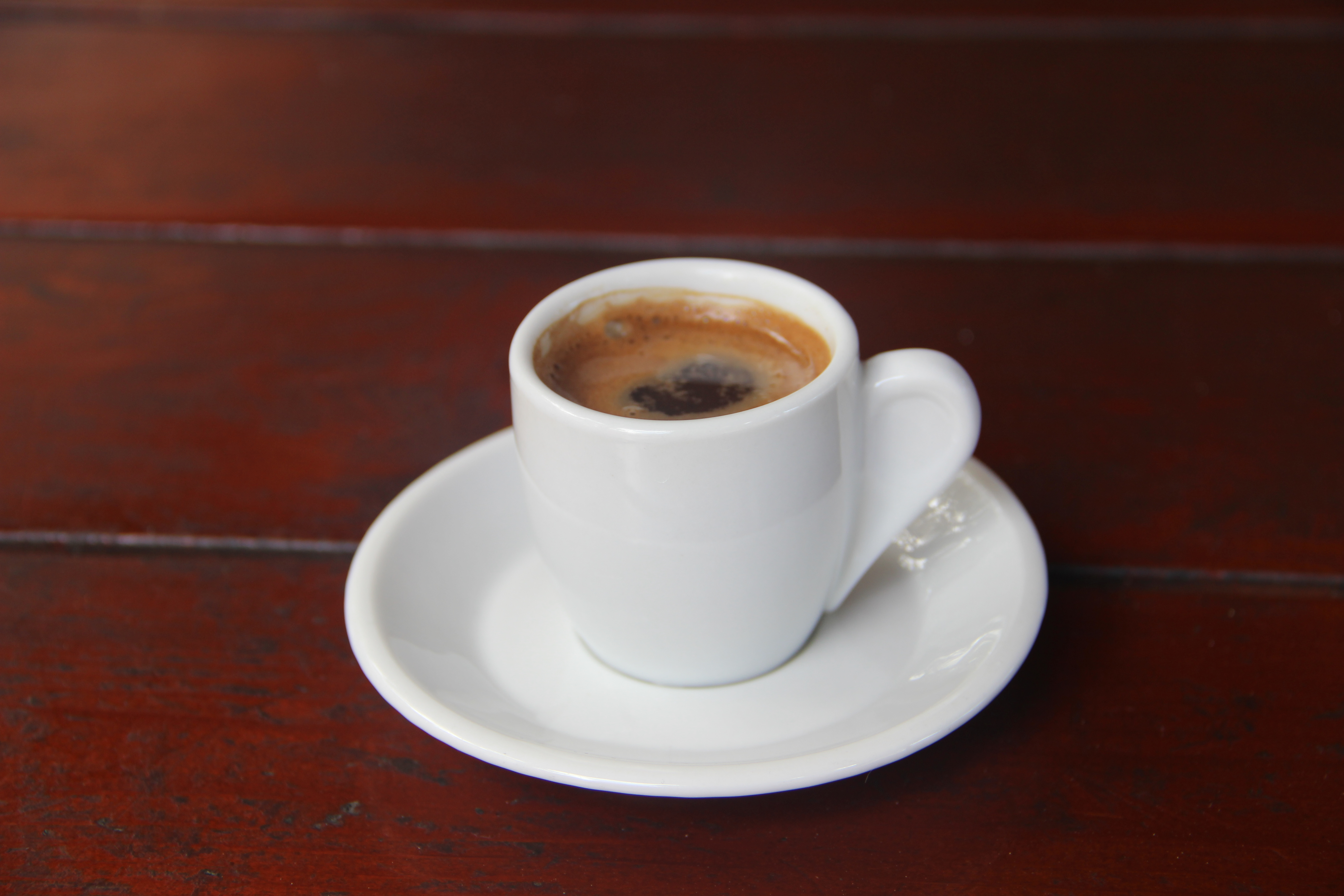
Greek coffee

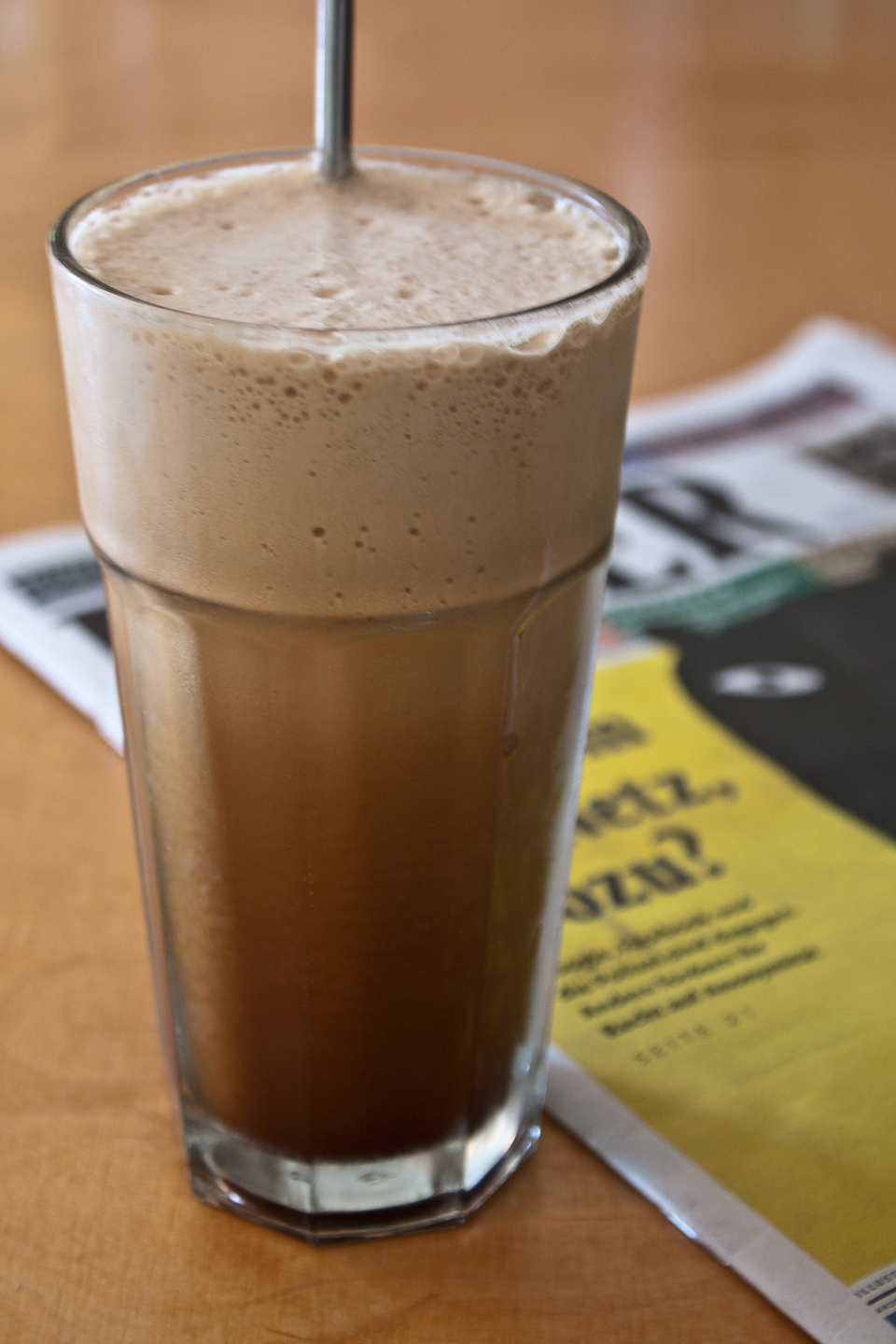
Café frappé

Selected drinks and beverages are:

- Greek mountain tea
- Greek coffee,
- Frappé coffee, invented in Thessaloniki in 1957.
- Freddo cappuccino,
- Esspreso freddo, iced coffee combines espresso and ice merely serve coffee over ice blends the two ingredients until the coffee is slightly chilled.
- Salepi,
- Ouzo,
- Retsina,
- Tsipouro,
- Tsikoudia,
- Gin,
- Liqueur,
- Beer, Beer in Greece.
- Souma, from island of Chios.
- Tentura, liqueur that hails from Patras.
- Kumquat, liqueur produced mainly on the island of Corfu.
- Kitron, or Kitro, liqueur produced on the island of Naxos.
- Fatourada, orange-flavored liqueur from the Greek island of Kythira.
- Mineral water, from several recognized water sources from Greece.
- Sparkling mineral water, mineral carbonated water from sources from Greece.
- Mastika, or mastiha, liqueur that is made with mastiha, mostly Chios Mastiha.
- Soumada, a non-alcoholic, syrupy, almond-based beverage that is produced on the island of Crete.
- Rakomelo, made by combining raki or tsipouro - two types of grape pomace brandy - with honey and several spices, such as cinnamon, cardamom, or other regional herbs. It is produced in Crete and other islands of the Aegean Sea.
- Metaxa, made from brandy, a secret combination of botanicals, and the aromatic and carefully selected Muscat wines from the island of Samos.
- Wine, Greece has approximately 200 vine varieties including, Agiorgitiko, Anthemis, Assyrtiko, Athiri, Begleri Ikaria, Debina, Fokiano Ikaria, Kidonitsa, Kotsifali, Lagorthi, Limnio, Liatiko, Limniona, Malagousia, Mandilaria, Mantinia, Mavrodafni, Mavrotragano, Moschofilero, Muscat of Limnos, Naousa, Negoska, Nemea, Oinomelo, Patras, Roditis, Rodola, Romeiko, Samos nectar, Samos Vin Doux, Savatiano, Vidiano, Vilana, Vinsanto (Visanto), Xinomavro.

== See also ==
- Greek Macedonian cuisine
- Greek food products
- Greek restaurant
- Greek wine
- Legal drinking age
- Public intoxication
- List of smoking bans
- Cypriot cuisine
- Nikolaos Tselementes
- Greek-American cuisine
- List of Michelin-starred restaurants in Greece
