= Thrapsathiri =

Greek wine grape variety

Thrapsathiri (Greek: Θραψαθήρι) is a white Greek wine grape variety that abounds in Crete. The grape is highly resistant to drought, ripens late and produces very aromatic wines with soft acidity. In the past, Thrapsathiri used to be blended with Vilana, but recently it is increasingly being vinified on its own.

Thrapsathiri used to be considered a clone of Athiri. However, DNA analysis has suggested that it is a distinct variety with links to Vidiano. It has also been suggested that Thrapsathiri is identical to Begleri found in the Cyclades winegrowing region.
