= Lefkes =

Lefkes may refer to several places in Greece:

- Lefkes, Amorgos, a village in the island of Amorgos, one of the Cyclades
- Lefkes, Chalkidiki, a village in Chalkidiki
- Lefkes, Paros, a village in the island of Paros, one of the Cyclades

== See also ==
- Lefka
- Lefki (disambiguation)
- Lefko (disambiguation)
