= Mavrotragano =

Greek wine varietal

- Grape (Vitis)
- Color of berry skin: Noir
- Species: Vitis vinifera
- Origin: Greece
- Notable regions: Santorini
- Ideal soil: Volcanic
- Year of protection: 2009 (PGI Cyclades)
- VIVC number: 40210

Mavrotragano (Greek: Μαυροτράγανο) is one of Greece's oldest red grape varieties, native to the Cyclades and originally grown on the volcanic soils of Santorini. Mavrotragano vines are predominantly ungrafted due to the volcanic soil's resistance to phylloxera. Once nearly extinct due to its low yields and sensitivity to drought, it was revived owing to the efforts of local growers who developed special pruning and cultivation techniques.

Traditionally used in sweet wine production, Mavrotragano has evolved into a variety capable of producing complex, dry red wines and some expressive rosés. Its cultivation has spread beyond Santorini to regions like Tinos, Crete, Thessaloniki, and the Peloponnese.

Mavrotragano wines are known for their deep color, firm tannins, and moderate acidity. Aromas often include ripe forest fruits, spices, coffee, and a distinct mineral note. The variety is also used in blends with grapes such as Mandilaria, Xinomavro, Syrah, and Kotsifali. It has excellent aging potential—up to 10–15 years for reds and around 3 years for rosés.

Mavrotragano wines have a Protected Geographical Indication status, under European Union's regulations on protecting the names of wines.
