= Limnio =

Variety of grape

- Grape (Vitis)
- Color of berry skin: Noir
- Species: Vitis vinifera
- Also called: See list of synonyms
- Origin: Greece
- VIVC number: 6835

Limnio (LIM-nee-oh) is a red Greek wine grape variety that is indigenous to the Greek island of Lemnos. The grape has had a long history of wine production that may extend back to Ancient Greece with wine historians widely believing it was the grape variety, Lemnia, that was described by Aristotle as producing the famous red Lemnian wine. According to wine expert Oz Clarke, Limnio is "One of Greece's most important red vines."

== History ==
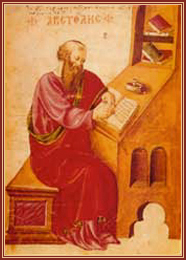
In his writings, Aristotle described a wine from the island of Lemos that was made from a grape, Limnia, that today is widely believed to be Limnio.

According to wine expert Jancis Robinson, Limnio was almost certainly the Lemnia grape described by Aristotle as a specialty of the island of Limnos-an assessment shared by other wine experts and historians. A Limnia grape was also referenced in Ancient Greek writings by Hesiod and Polydeuctes.

== Wine regions ==
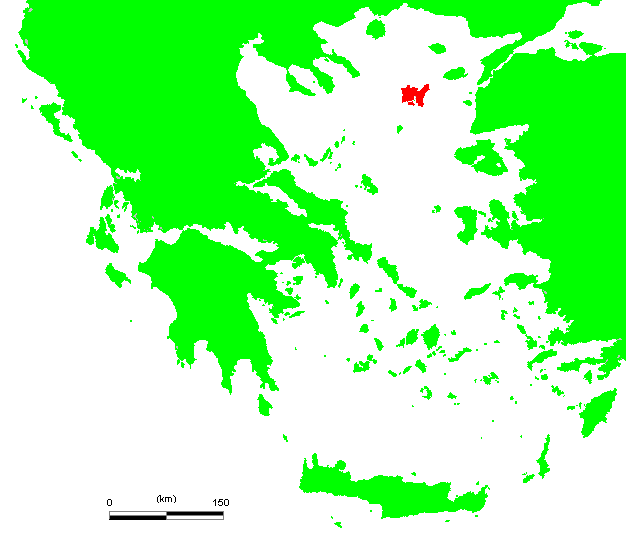
Location of Lemnos, ancestral home of the Greek wine grape Limnio.

Today, Limnio is still being produced on Lemnos, though it is not utilized in the appellation wine produced on the island. (Technically the only appellation wine produced on Lemnos is from Muscat of Alexandria According to information by the Union of Agricultural Cooperatives of Lemnos (E.A.S.) the total production of Muscat of Alexandria (white wine), delivered by the producers to the Union, was 2,449 tonnes of grapes, while Limnio (Kalambaki) was 86 tones.) with notable plantings around Mount Athos. It is a principal grape variety in the Playies Melitona Appellation of Origin (A.O.) as well as the Drama TI (a Greek wine region similar to a vin de pays) in Macedonia.

== Viticulture and winemaking ==
Limnio vines are known for their hardiness and ability to survive harsh droughts. The grapes have the ability to produce high must weights that translates into noticeable alcohol levels. They are generally late ripening with phenols that will produces enhanced herbaceous tones if the grapes are not harvested early. Today it is often blended with Cabernet Sauvignon in Meritage-style wines. Other grape varieties that may be blended with Limnio include Cabernet Franc, Cinsaut, Grenache, Petite Sirah, Merlot, Aghiorgitiko and Xynomavro.

== Wine styles and food pairing ==
As a varietal, Limnio produces full bodied wines with moderate tannins and acidity levels and a distinctive mineral aroma. When blended, Limnio adds color, weight, acidity and an herbal aroma which Oz Clarke describes as reminiscent of bay leaves. Wines made from Limnio are often paired with aged cheeses, game meat and roasted dishes.

== Synonyms ==
Limnio is also known under the synonyms Kalabaki, Kalambaki, Kalampaki, Lembiotiko, Lemnia, Lemnio, Lemniotico, Lemniotiko, Limniotico, Mavro Limnio, Ntourou Kara, and Ntoyrou Kara.
