= Liatiko =

Variety of grape

Liatiko (Greek: Λιάτικο) is an old red Greek wine grape variety that is grown on the island of Crete. While the name suggests a relationship with the Italian variety Aleatico, ampelographers currently discount a connection. Liatiko grapes have a pale red color, are moderate in acidity and rich in aromas and sugars. Liatiko matures in July, a fact that according to one explanation derives its name from Ιουλιάτικο, literally "of July" (Ιούλιος in Greek). Historically, the grape has been used in blends with Mandilaria and Kotsifali to produce Malvasia, a very alcoholic, sweet red wine. Malvasia was widely exported by Venetian traders during the Middle Ages and was highly regarded throughout western Europe.

== Synonyms ==
Various synonyms have been used to describe Liatiko and its wines, including Liatico, Liatis, Mavroliatis, Mayrodiates and Mavrodiates. In Turkey the grape is known as Çal Karası.
