= Trikomo =

Trikomo may refer to:

- Trikomo, Cyprus
- Trikomo, Greece
