= Aidini =

Variety of grape

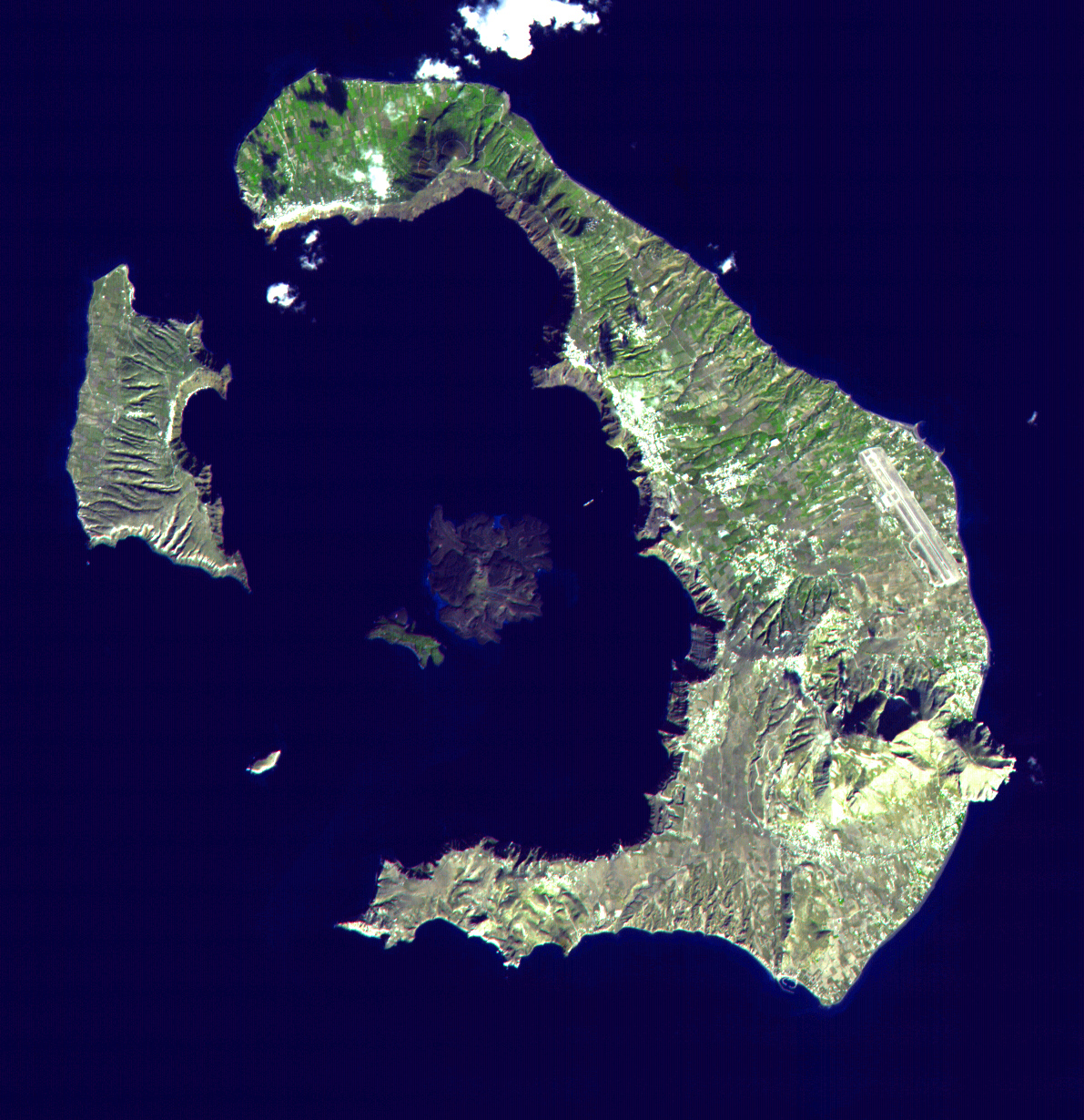
The island of Santorini where the Aidini grape variety is found.

Aidini (also spelled Aidani and Aedani) is a white Greek wine grape variety that is grown primarily on the island of Santorini but it can also be found on other Greek isles in the Aegean Sea. The grape is known for its floral aroma and is used mainly in winemaking as a blending partner with grapes such as Athiri to make dry wines.

== Synonyms ==
The Aidini grape is known under several synonyms in the Mediterranean including Aidani Aspro, Aedano, Aedani, Aidano, Aspedano, Aspraidano, Asproaidani, Leyko, Lefko, Lafko Aidani and Lefko Ithani.
