= Vidiano =

Greek wine grape variety

Vidiano (Greek: Βιδιανό) is a white Greek wine grape variety indigenous to Crete, considered as an emerging star of the island's wines. It is a high-quality wine with moderate acidity, and complex aromas reminiscent of peach, apricot, melon honey and herbs. The grape is difficult to cultivate and is grown in small scale, primarily in Rethymno and secondarily around Heraklion. It thrives in modest fertility, dry, calcareous and well-drained soils. The berries ripen early and have thick skin. Vidiano is moderately resistant to downy mildew and sensitive to powdery mildew. It is genetically close to Thrapsathiri and Vilana.
