= Bonedry =

Bonedry may refer to:

- Bonedry clay, the stage at which greenware is ready to be fired.
- Bone-dry wine, dry wine with residual sugar levels of less than 0.5%, such as Santorini.
