= Santorini (wine) =

Greek wine region

- Wine region
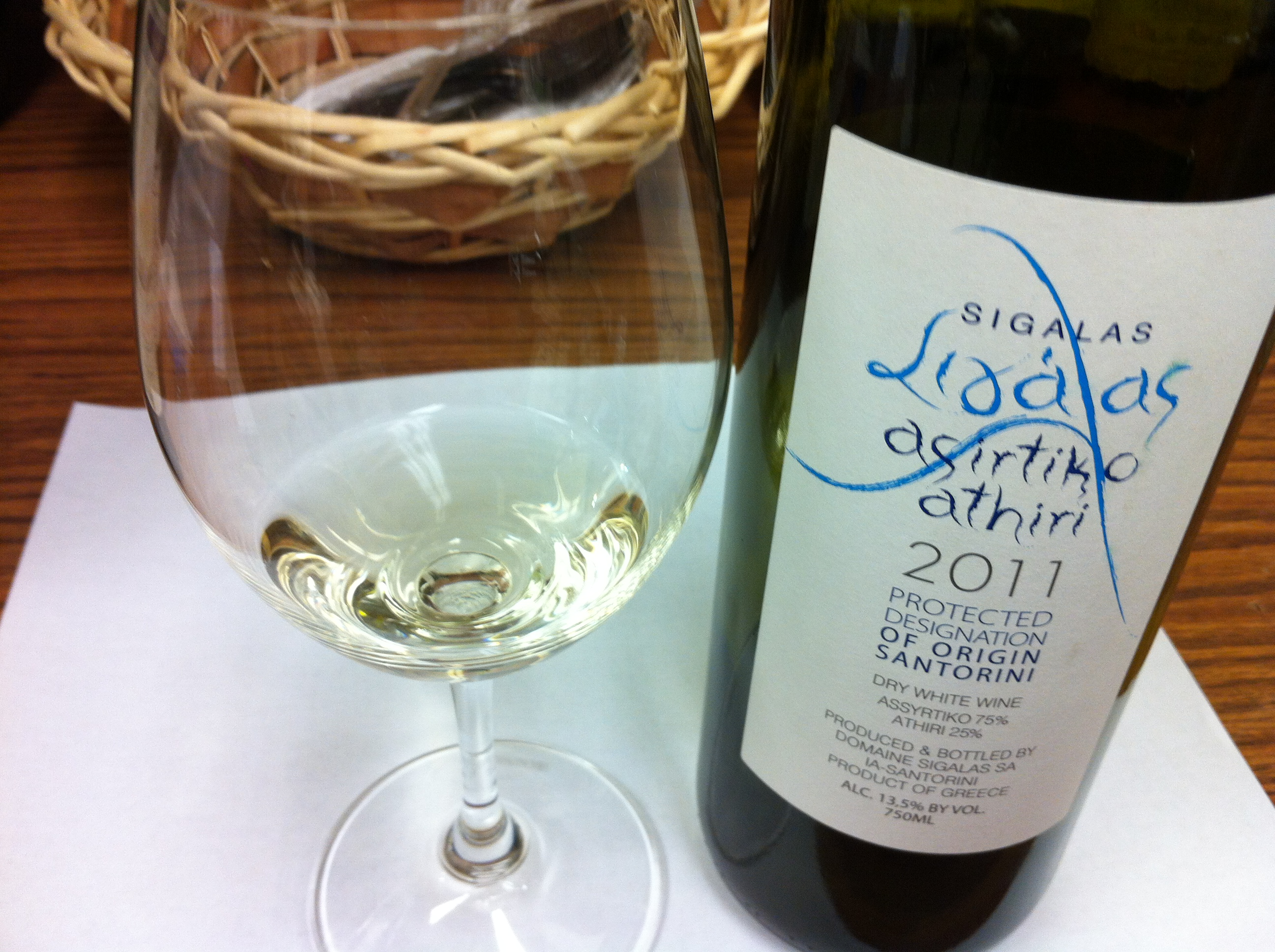
- A Santorini wine blend of Assyrtiko and Athiri.
- Year established: Early 19th century
- Country: Greece
- Part of: Cyclades islands
- Other regions in Cyclades islands: Mezzo
- Soil conditions: Very poor
- Grapes produced: Athiri, Aidini, Assyrtiko, Mandelaria

Santorini is a Greek wine region located on the archipelago of Santorini in the southern Cyclades islands of Greece. Wine has been produced there since ancient times, but it was during the Middle Ages that the wine of Santorini became famous worldwide under the influence of the Republic of Venice. The Italian influence is still present in modern Santorini winemaking: the most famous Tuscan sweet wine is called Vin Santo just like Santorini's Vinsanto/Visanto (labeled such to differentiate it from the Tuscan wine). It is made in a passito style from grapes dried in the sun after harvest.

Santorini also produces blended and rosé wine made from white grapes such as Athiri, Aidini and Assyrtiko, and red grapes such as Mandelaria.

== History ==
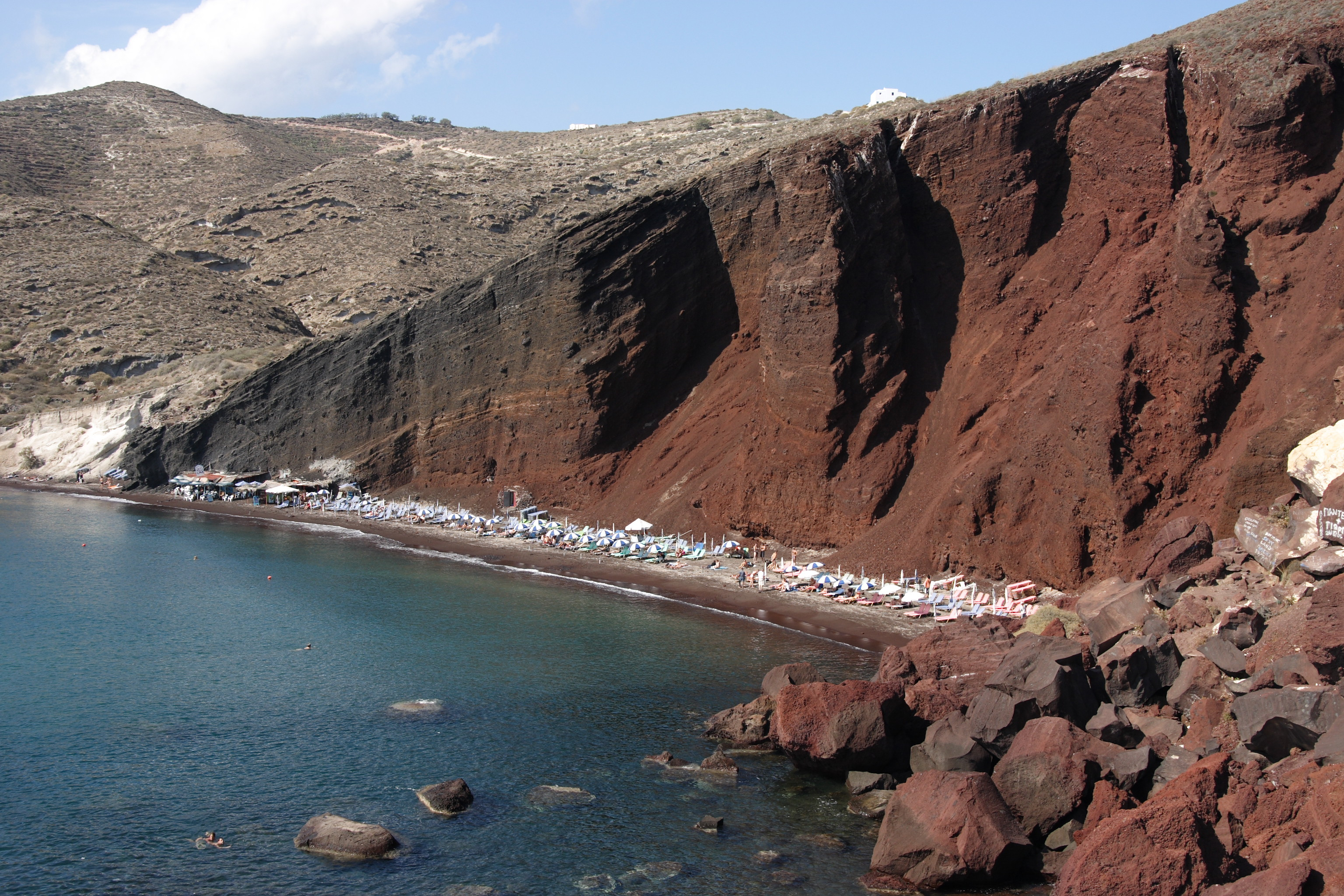
The island of Santorini is a remnant of an ancient volcano that erupted around 1640–1620 BC.

In its early geological history, Santorini was the core of an ancient volcano that erupted in about 1640–1620 BC. A large part of the island became submerged, creating the modern day archipelago. Wine was made on the island in Greek and Roman times, but the region became particularly noteworthy in the Middle Ages when Crusaders captured control of the island from the Byzantine Empire after Constantinople was sacked in 1203. One of the crusaders was a Venetian nobleman whose family maintained control of the island until 1336 when it became part of the Venetian maritime state Duchy of Naxos.

Under the Venetian influence, with this extensive trade network and maritime control, Santorini wines were widely exported throughout the Mediterranean and Europe. The wine was particularly prized for its ability to withstand the month-long sea voyages due, in part, to its sweetness and high alcohol levels. So highly valued was Santorini wines during this period that when the Ottoman Turks captured the region in 1579, they did not discourage the trade of the wine. One explanation for the Turks concession was that the poor soil and perilous topography of the island, with cliffs running right to the sea, made the cultivation of other cash crops difficult. When the Russian Orthodox Church adopted Santorini wine as the official Eucharistic wine of the church, the Ottomans allowed the island producers to trade freely with Russia even during the frequent wars between the two empires.

During the early 19th century a variety of wines were produced in Santorini, both red and white. The best red wine was called Santorin (or Santo, Vino di Baccho), representing a dry fine-tasting claret, with an approach to port. The most famous white wine was called Nykteri (Vino di Notte or night wine). There were two varieties of Nykteri, one named Kalliste, being stronger and richer; the other, called Elia, was somewhat weaker, but both are mentioned to be equal to the best French wines, particularly for table use. The "king" of Santorini wines, however, was the Vino Santo, occurring in two varieties: dark-red and amber coloured. This wine was sweet, rich, very dry, and has a strong stimulating aroma. The quantity of wine exported was 45–50,000 barrels per year (from 36 to 40 thousand hectoliters).

== Climate and geography ==
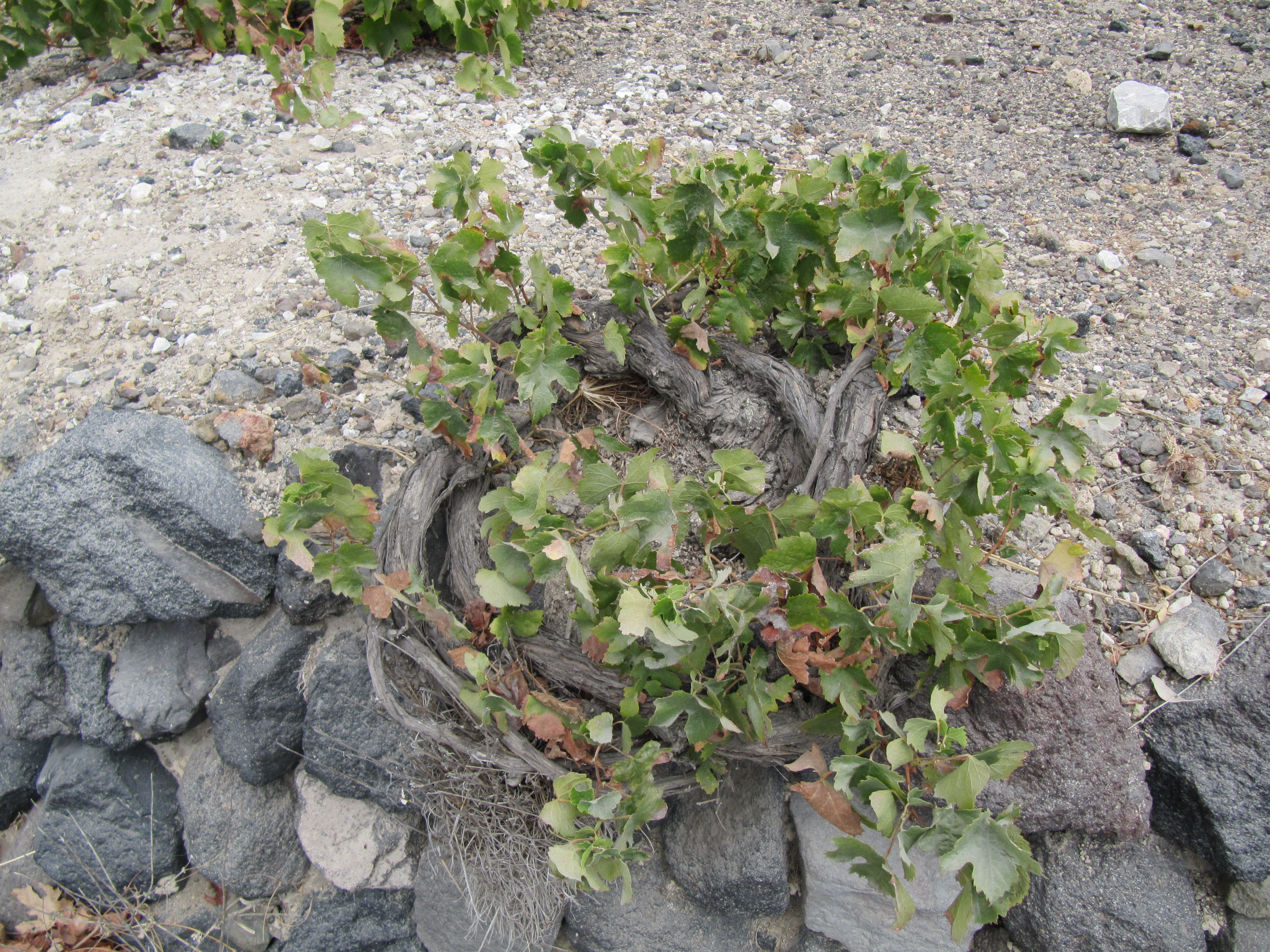
Santorini vines are kept unstaked and trained low to the ground in a basket shape that helps protect the grapes from the fierce winds and heat of the island.

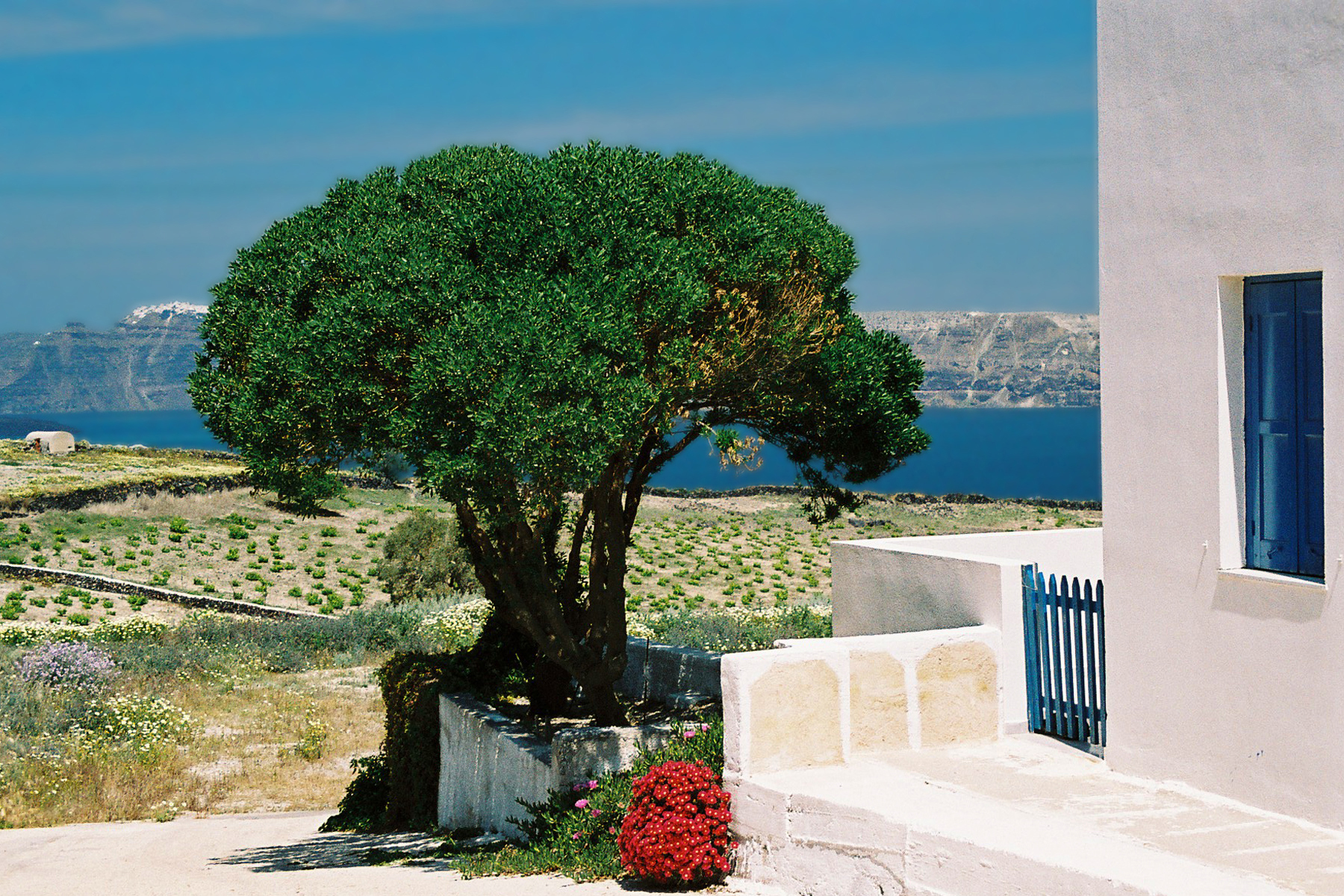
pumice soil, when weathered, is very fertile...

Located in the Aegean Sea, Santorini has a distinctly Mediterranean climate that is characterized by warm temperatures, low rainfall but high humidity during the growing season. The area is subjected to strong winds coming off the oceans which can damage the vines and grapes if they are not trained low to the ground for protection. The vineyard soils of the region are very poor, composed of volcanic ash and rocks. The calcareous subsoils are porous which helps to retain some of the humidity in the air and release it as moisture in the night for the vines to use.

== Grapes and wine ==
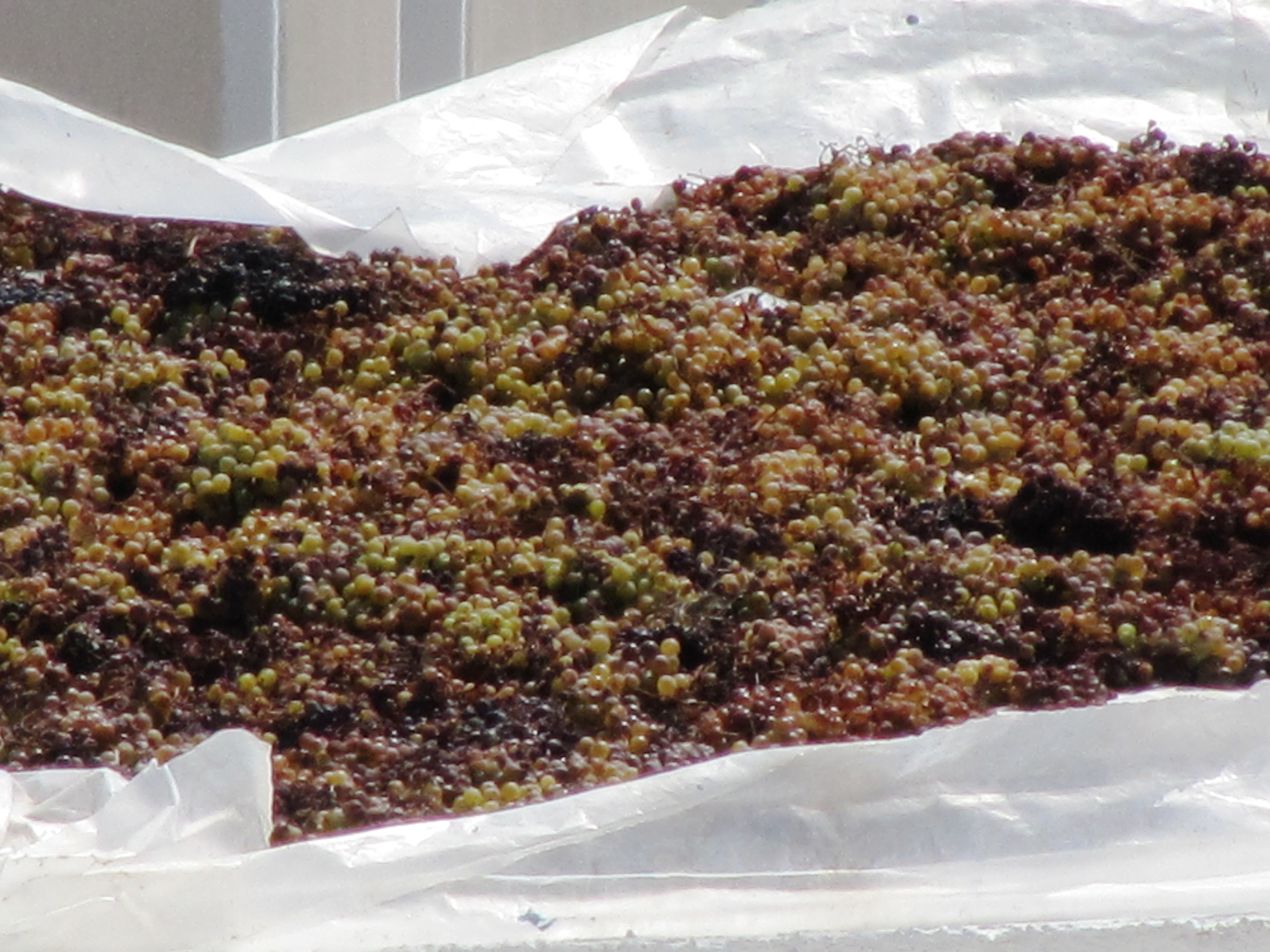
Grapes drying out in the sun on Santorini

The island of Santorini is most famously known for its indigenous white grape varieties Assyrtiko, Athiri and Aidani, though some wines made from international varieties and also from indigenous red grapes such as Mandilaria and Mavrotragano can be found. With about 1,200 hectares (3,000 acres) of land are under vine, there is a constant struggle with Santorini's tourism industry that puts this small number at risk of decreasing even further.

Assyrtiko is the island's flagship grape. It's a high acid grape full of citrus and mineral nuances. It can be enjoyed on its own or with grilled fish and meats. The grape is often referred to as a "white grape in red’s clothing," due to the full-bodied wines it produces with an average of 13.5% abv.

Santorini is immune to phylloxera as its volcanic soils contain none of the clay that is necessary for parasite to survive. As a result, many of the roots found on the vines on Santorini are centuries old. The grape growers of Santorini use a unique bush-training system, known as koulara, to grow the grapes. As the vines grow, they are woven into baskets with the grapes facing toward the inside of the ring. The vine's leaves and vine provide protection for the grapes from harsh winds and sunlight. The koulara are often grown haphazardly on small plots of land and can be mistaken for wild bushes by unknowing passers-by. Grape varieties are frequently grown together and the growers are often unaware which grapes are which until harvest which takes place in mid-August.

At the age of 75 a vine is generally woven into many layers and it may be unable to provide proper nutrients and high enough yields to keep in production. As a result, it is clipped at its roots and a new vine is connected to the rootstock. It is important to keep the roots healthy and in use as their old age has allowed them to grow deep into the calcareous soils, extracting any moisture that may be available.

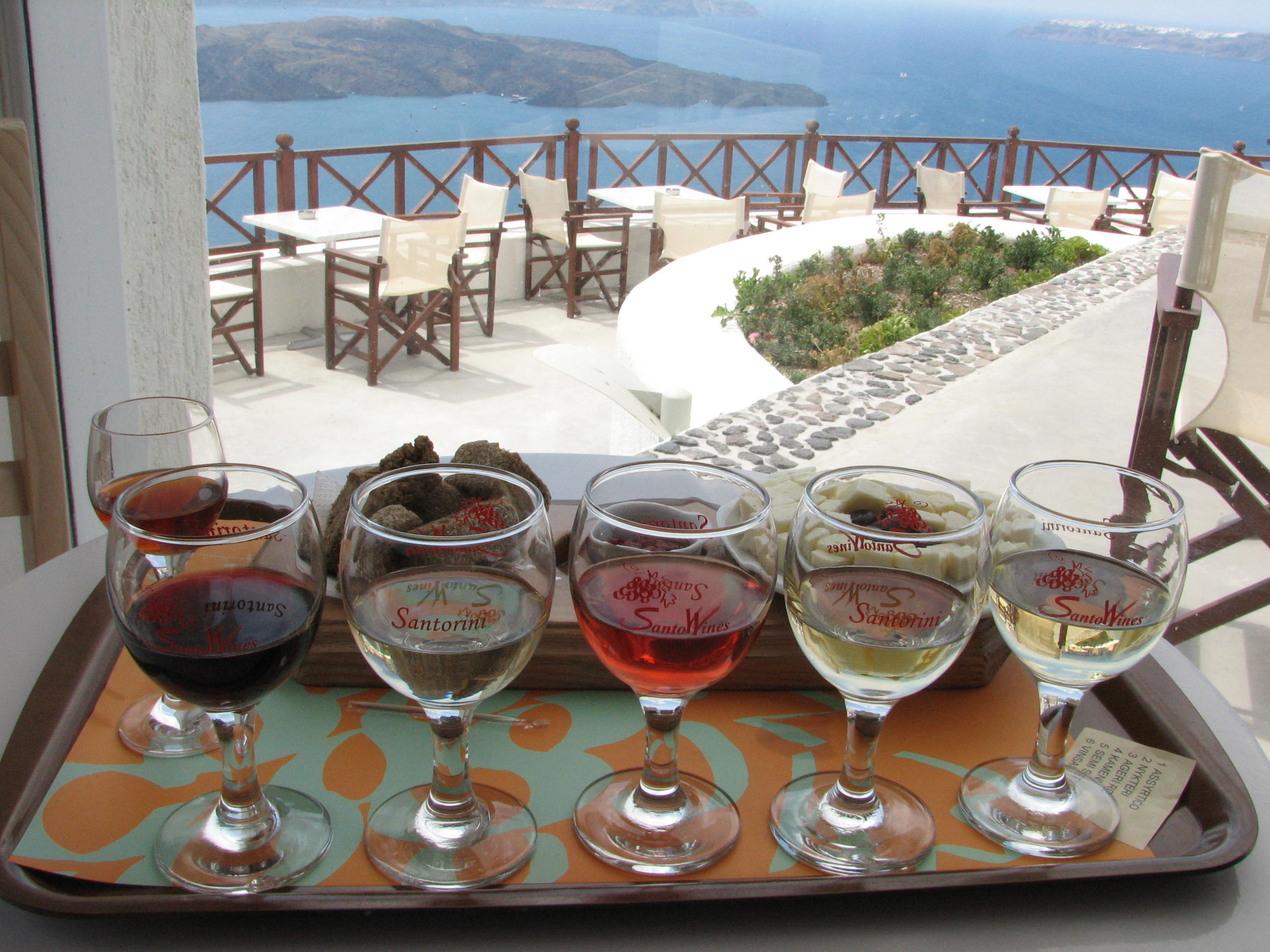
An assortment of Santorini wines

Santorini classified wines: Santorini, Nykteri and Vinsanto (see below for Vinsanto information.)

Santorini: This wine must contain 75% or more of the Assyrtiko grape variety with the remaining 25% made up from Athiri and/or Aidani. The wine is generally unoaked, but some wineries choose to make a small portion of oaked wine due to Assyrtiko's versatility. Either way has a great gaining potential due to the high acidity of the grapes. The wine is bone-dry with high acid toting flavors of lemon and stone fruits with a distinct taste of minerality.

Nykteri: In Greek, the name means "working the night away" as it was traditionally harvested at night to avoid the hot temperatures and create a fine wine with little extraction from color and exposure to air. The grapes were to be picked before sunrise and pressed and drawn off within the first day. Today, many producers still choose to harvest the grapes at night, but some also harvest during the day. It is at least 75% Assyrtiko with the remaining composition allowed to derive from Athiri and Aidani. After vinification in steel or oak, Nykteri wines must be aged in oak for a minimum of three months. These wines are bone-dry and contain high acid and mineral components bringing forth flavors of citrus and stone fruits.

Mezzo: Although this wine is not part of Greece's classification system, it is a wine commonly produced. This is a sweet wine made from the island's white or red grapes and is similar to Vinsanto, but literally means "less sweet." The grapes are also sun dried, but before vinification dry grape must is added to the run-off juice from the raisined grapes.

=== Vinsanto ===
Vinsanto is an ancient winemaking tradition of Santorini that dates back thousands of years and represents an important part of Santorini's history.

For a wine to be labeled Vinsanto in Santorini the wine must be predominately made from the Assyrtiko grape—at least 51%, the remaining 49% is made up of Athiri and Aidani and some small amounts of locally grown white varieties. Vinsanto does not undergo any chaptalization and is made up only of the natural sugars and acids of the grapes. Vinsanto is made from late harvested grapes that have been dried in the sun for 12–14 days. They are then crushed and fermented and are then aged for a minimum of 24 months in oak barrels. Vinsanto must achieve a minimum of 9% abv.

Vinsanto is known for its golden-orange to dark amber coloring with a flavors of dried apricots, golden raisins, sweet spice and an underlying minerality. Although it is classified as a dessert wine, the high acid of the Assyrtiko and other indigenous grapes grown on the island balance the sugar content to produce an extremely palatable drink that can be paired with a variety of foods.

The winemaking style of vin santo can also be found throughout Italy and has historically been known as Italy's "Holy Wine" as it was used in the Catholic Eucharist due to its sweetness.

Another theory relates its origins partially with Santorini. Santorini was used as a trading port through much of history, but produced very little goods themselves. Only with the Venetian domination the island focused on the cultivation of wine that would be exported from the island throughout the Mediterranean. Packages taken from the island were labeled "Santo" to denote their origin. Wine from the island was denoted "vin" or "vino" (the Italian word for "wine") to denote the packages contents; thus, the term "Vinsanto" was born.

In 2002, the EU determined that there was enough information to name Santorini, Greece as Vinsanto's place of origin thus granting the island exclusive rights to the use of the name Vinsanto on its sweet wines. Italy may still use vin santo or vino santo to denote its winemaking style. Laying down certain rules for applying Council Regulation as regards the description, designation, presentation and protection of certain wine sector products.

== Wine Museum of Santorini ==
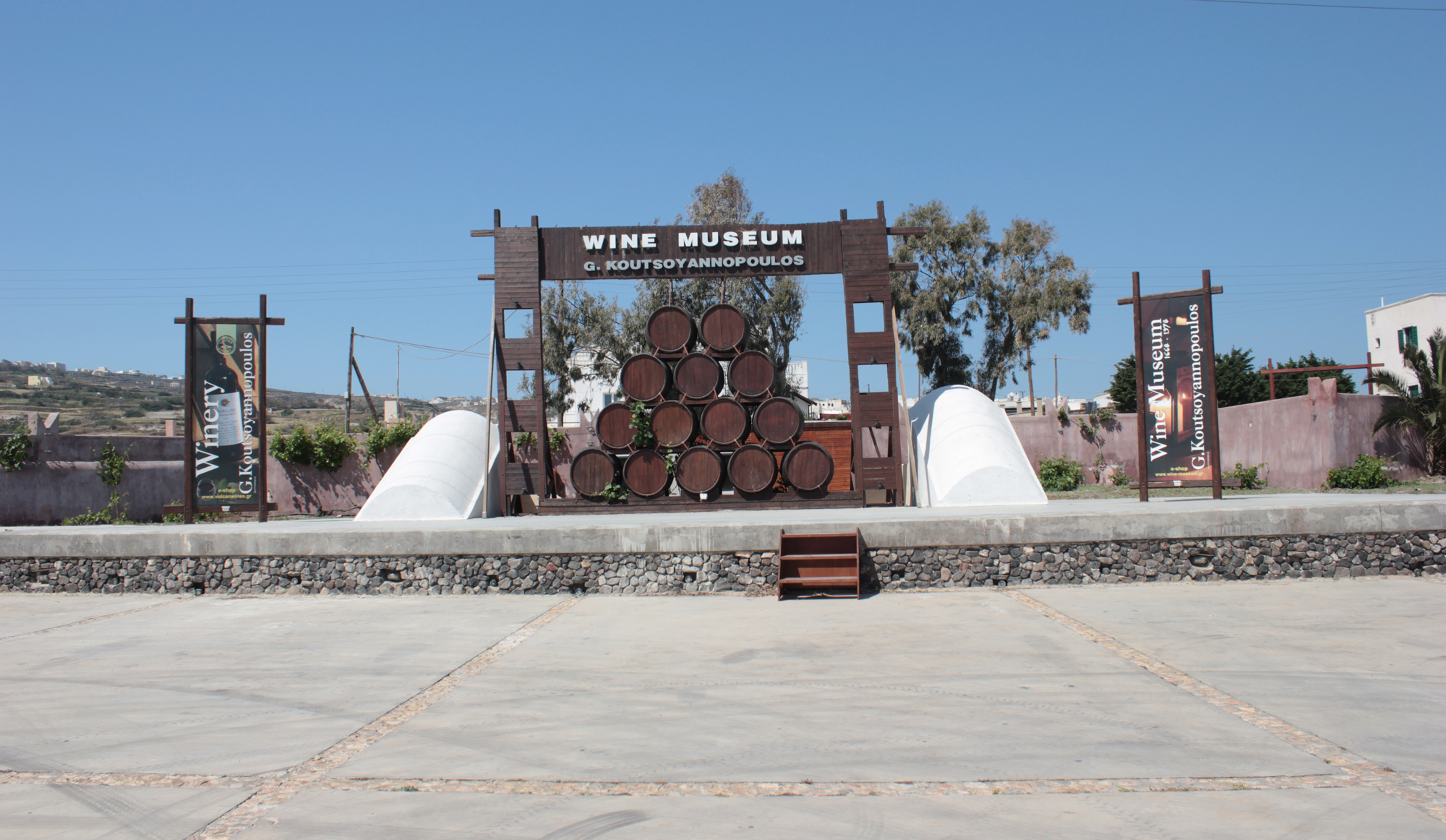
Wine museum and winery of G.Koutsogiannopoulos

The Wine Museum is established in a cave on the ground of Koutsogiannopoulos Winery near the village of Messaria.
