= Rhoditis =

Variety of grape

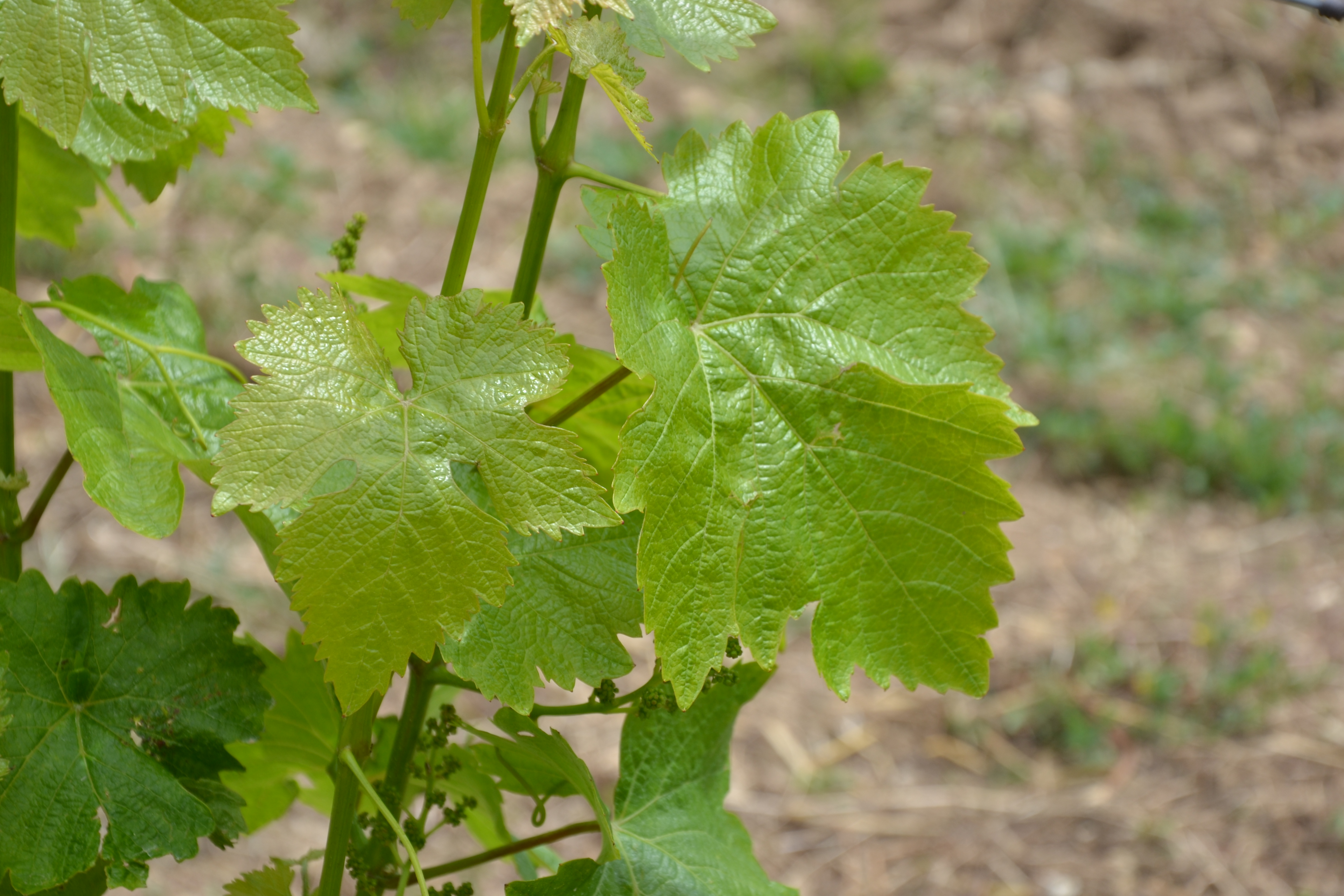
Leaf of Rhoditis grape vines.

Rhoditis (also known as Roditis) is a pink-skinned Greek wine grape traditionally grown in the Peloponnese region of Greece. The grape was highly valued in the Greek wine industry prior to the phylloxera outbreak due to its ability to ripen late and maintain its acidity in hot climates like those of Peloponnese and Thessaly. However its susceptibility to powdery mildew and phylloxera dramatically reduced it plantings throughout the 20th century. Today it is most commonly blended with Savatiano in making the Greek wine Retsina.

== Wine regions ==
Today, Rhoditis is commonly found in the former Greek colony of Anchialos (today the Bulgarian city of Pomorie), Volos, Thessaly and throughout the Peloponnese. In Patras, it is the principal grape behind the delicately perfumed wines named after the city.
