= Lefko =

Lefko (Greek: Λευκό, meaning "white") may refer to the following:

- Lefko, Aetolia-Acarnania, a village in the municipality Thermo, Aetolia-Acarnania, Greece
- Popular Unions of Bipartisan Social Groups, a Greek political party, better known by its acronym LEFKO
- Lefko (grape), a synonym for several Greek wine grapes, most notably Aidini
