= Agiorgitiko =

Variety of grape

- Grape (Vitis)
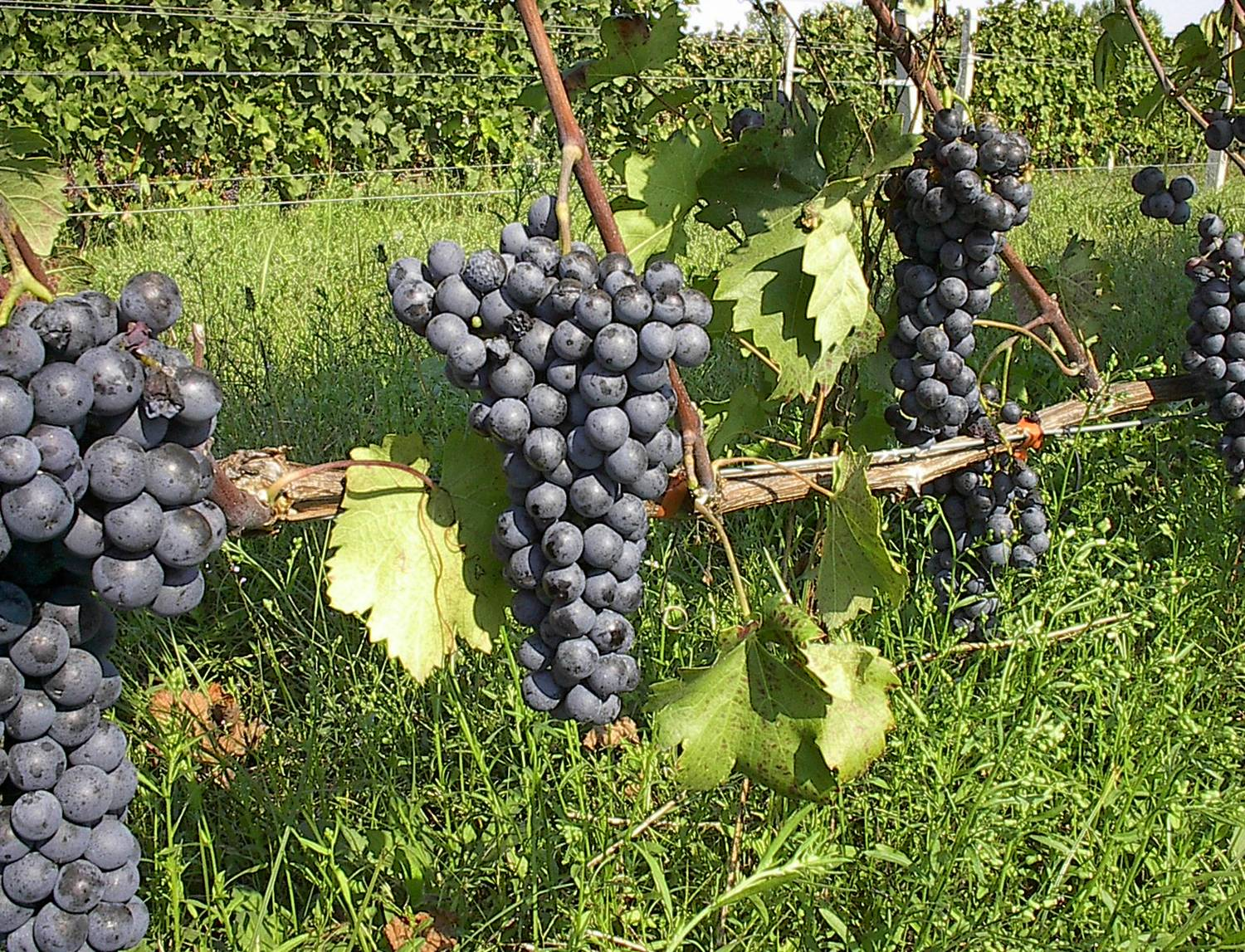
- Color of berry skin: Noir
- Species: Vitis vinifera
- Also called: Aghiorghitiko, Mavro Nemeas, St. George, and other synonyms
- Origin: Nemea
- Notable regions: Greece
- VIVC number: 102

Agiorgitiko (Greek: Αγιωργίτικο; also known as Aghiorghitiko) is a red Greek wine grape variety that, as of 2012, was the most widely planted red grape variety in Greece, ahead of Xynomavro. The grape has traditionally been grown in the Nemea region of the Peloponnese but can be found throughout the country including Attikí (Attica) and Makedonía (Macedonia).

One of the more commercially important indigenous Greek varieties, it can exhibit a wide range of characteristics, from soft to very tannic, depending on factors in the growing and winemaking processes. The grape is typically made as a varietal, though it is notably blended with Cabernet Sauvignon in the area around Metsovo to make the table wine traditionally called katoi. In the region of Nemea it is often made into rosés of oak-aged red wines.

Agiorgitiko is very fruity, spicy, and well-colored, with notes of plum, but lacks acidity and body. It is generally planted in dry, infertile soil to encourage the production of fewer but more concentrated grapes, ripening after mid-September.

== History ==
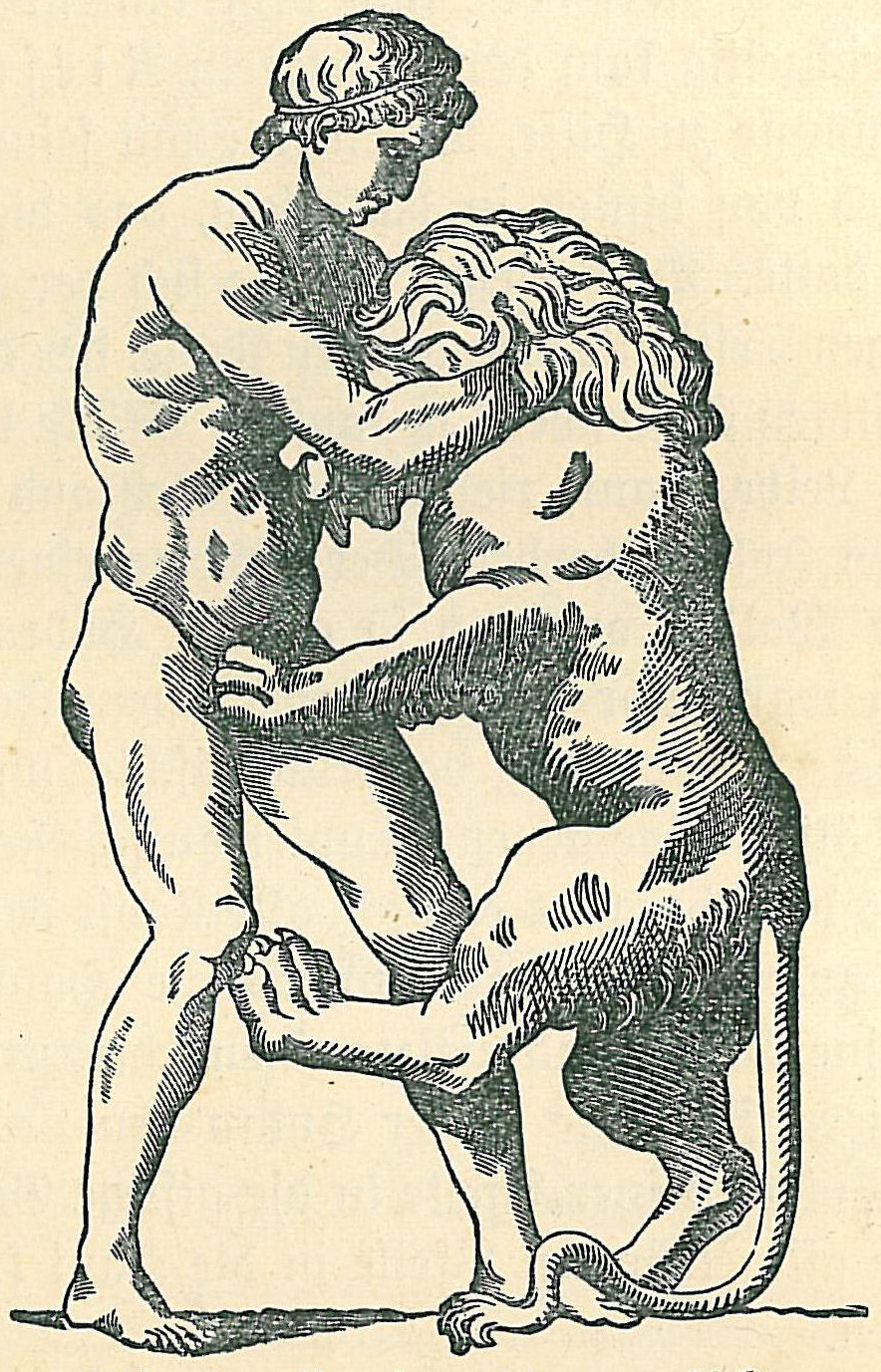
In Nemea, the Agiorgitiko wine of the region is nicknamed the "Blood of Hercules" based on the legend of the Greek hero slaying the Nemean lion.

Ampelographers believe that Agiorgitiko is indigenous to Greece, likely the Argolis and Corinthia regions of Peloponnese, but while apocryphal tales exist of the grape being cultivated in Ancient Greece, there is no historical or genetic evidence to support those tales. In Nemea, the wine made from Agiorgitiko is nicknamed the "Blood of Hercules" because of the legend that after the Greek hero slayed the Nemean lion, it was the local Nemean wine made from Agiorgitiko that he consumed. (Some versions of the story has Hercules consuming the wine before slaying the lion.) Another legend states that the wine was a palace favorite of king Agamemnon who led the Greek forces during the Trojan War.

The name Agiorgitiko means literally "St. George's grape" which could be a reference to the chapel of Saint George in Nemea or to Saint George's Day which is celebrated in November around harvest time in some Eastern Orthodox Churches. However, in many of the Greek areas where Agiorgitiko is grown, Saint George's Day is celebrated in April or May which cast doubt on the theory that the grape's name is affiliated with the feast day. Another theory is that the grape is named after one of the many Greek towns named after the Christian saint.

The main land owners in Nemea was the church and the monks from St George monastery of Feneos would tend to the vineyards and harvest the grapes to make wine at the monastery for communion. This is another theory of the naming of the St George wine is after the St George monastery of Feneos.

== Viticulture ==
Agiorgitiko tends to produce small clusters of small, thick-skinned berries. The vine is highly disease prone with Master of Wine Jancis Robinson noting that "virtually all Agiorgitiko vines planted in Greece are virused." Depending on the virus, and age of the vine, this can lead to issues with ripeness and yields which can affect the resulting quality of the wine.

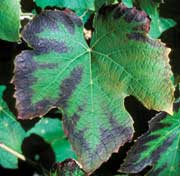
Agiorgitiko vines are very susceptible to suffering from potassium deficiency (effects pictured on a grape leaf)

The grape is a late budding and ripening variety that is prone to produce high yields if not kept in check by winter pruning or green harvesting. In addition to its susceptibility to numerous grapevine viruses, Agiorgitiko is also very sensitive to fungal infection from botrytis bunch rot, downy and powdery mildew. The vine also responds adversely to water stress which may require some irrigation in regions where the practice is permitted. In order to limit yields, Agiorgitiko is often densely planted in poor vineyard soils but growers need to be mindful of the variety's sensitivity to potassium deficiency.

Wine expert Tom Stevenson notes that while Agiorgitiko vines can withstand heat well, the grape tends to produce better in higher altitude vineyards that are slightly cooler but still sufficiently warm to ensure that the grape fully ripens. The altitude of the vineyard, in particular, seems to have an effect on how much of a "spicy note" comes out in the flavor of the resulting wines.

=== New clones ===
For most of the 21st century, growers have been working with Greek wine authorities to produce new virus-free clones of Agiorgitiko that have the potential to resist most grape disease, including botrytis bunch rot, and produce small berries with thicker skins that could ripen to higher sugar levels with most consistent yields. In 2012, several of these new clones were released to Greek wine growers who have slowly begun replanting their Agiorgitiko vineyards.

== Wine regions ==
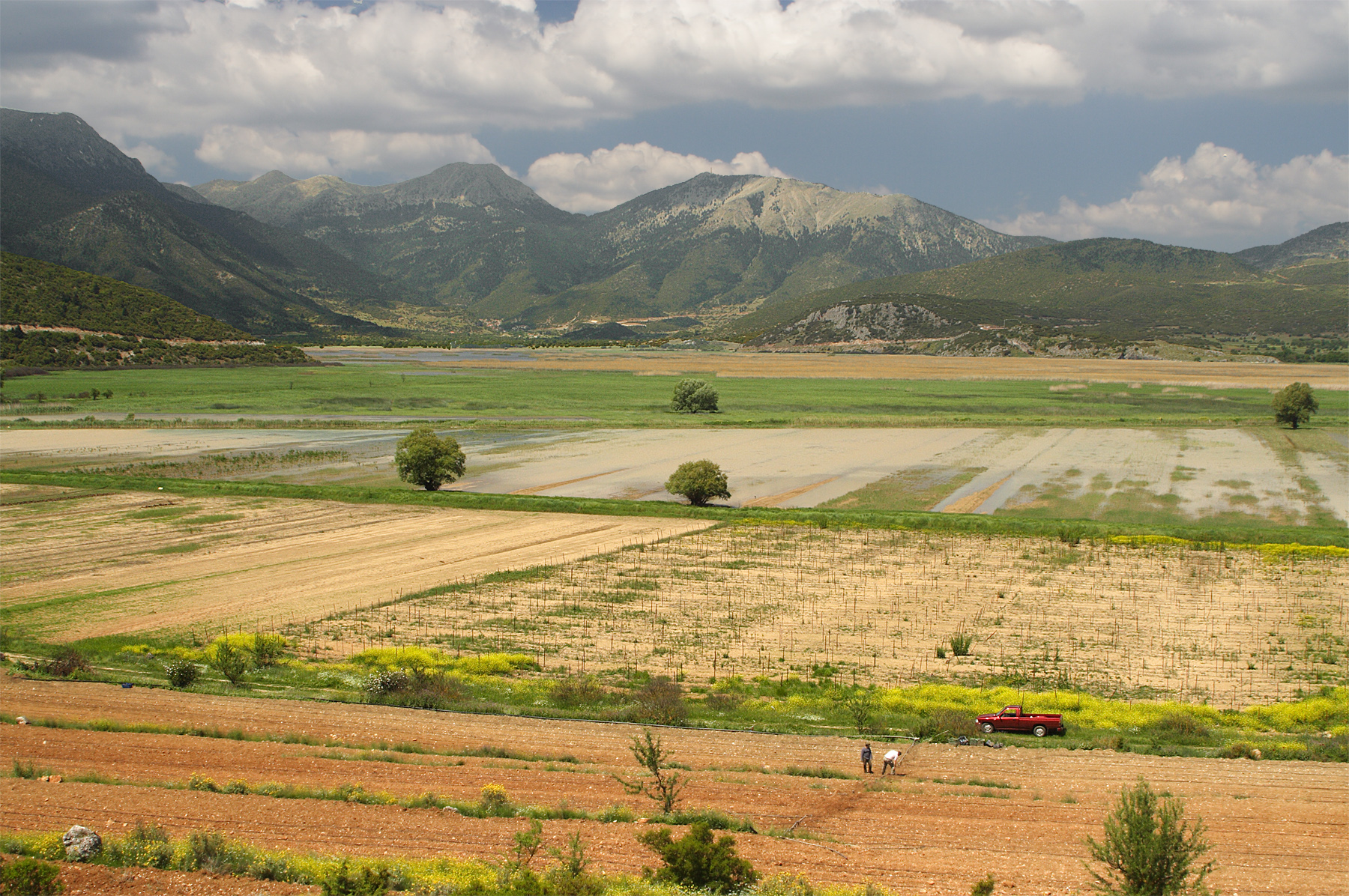
Agiorgitiko is widely planted in the Peloponnese (vineyard and planted fields pictured) region of Greece.

In 2012, Agiorgitiko was the most widely planted red grape variety in Greece with 5,202 hectares (12,850 acres) in Attica, 3,204 hectares (7,920 acres) in Peloponnese and additional plantings in Macedonia and Epirus. The grape is most widely associated with the dry and sweet red wines of Nemea in northeastern Peloponnese. Here the grape is only variety permitted in the Oeni Onomasias Proelefseos Anoteras Poiotitas (OPAP) (a designated wine region similar to the French Appellation d'origine contrôlée (AOC) system). In Nemea, the grape is only used for red wine production with its use in making rosé styles of wine prohibited. Around the town of Metsovo in Epirus, the grape is often blended with Cabernet Sauvignon.

According to Master of Wine Jancis Robinson, some of the "most serious examples" of Agiorgitiko come from the higher altitude vineyards (up to 900 metres (3,000 ft)) of the Asprokampos plateau around Nemea and in the hills (between 500 metres (1,600 ft) to 600 metres (2,000 ft)) around Koutsi in Corinthia.

== Styles ==
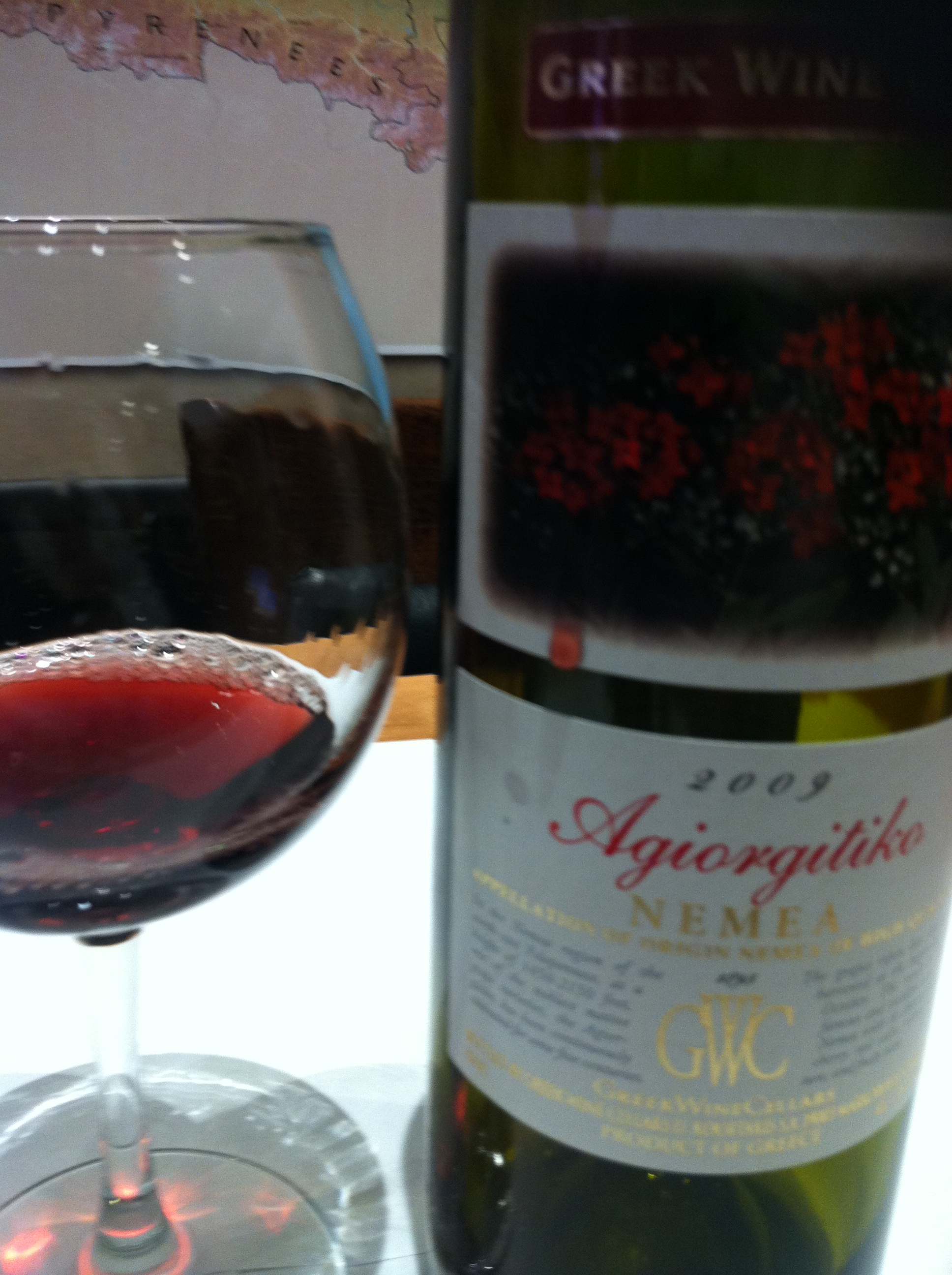
A Nemea wine made from 100% Agiorgitiko

Agiorgitiko is an extravagant grape variety that can be made in a wide range of styles from light rosés to soft, fruity reds made by carbonic maceration in a style similar to the French wines of Beaujolais, to very tannic wines with spicy, red fruit aromas and the potential to age. At its most extreme, Agiorgitiko wines have the potential to be very low in acidity, high alcohol and high in phenolics with both issues requiring the winemaker to make decisions on how to handle these components in order to make a balanced wine.

The small berries and thick skins of the grape contribute to high phenolic levels of Agiorgitiko which leads the wine needing very little maceration time in order to extract the deep, dark color associated with the grape. It also contribute to the tannin levels and the grape's ability to handle the effects of oak aging in the barrel.

According to wine expert Karen MacNeil, some examples of Agiorgitiko can be lush and "almost Port-like" with spicy, peppery flavors. Oz Clarke notes that the quality of Nemean wine made from Agiorgitiko is highly dependent on the individual skill of the winemaker and that "Only an example whose burly, rugged power has not been diminished by oxidation and lazy winemaking will age properly". Tom Stevenson notes that some examples can "be spoiled by dried-out or dead fruit" that is harvested too late, with too little acidity, at excessively ripe levels.

According to the Wine & Spirit Education Trust (WSET), the best examples of Agiorgitiko tend to have moderate to low acidity, with a deep, ruby color, red fruit aromas and a sweet spicy note. These examples tend to come from vineyards planted in the middle range of the hillside slopes around Nemea with grapes harvested near the top of the 900 metres (3,000 ft) hills being excessively acidic while those harvested from the very warm valley floor often being too "jammy". The variance in quality of Agiorgitiko from the different vineyards around Nemea have led some Greek wine producers to investigate developing a cru classification system.

Unlike the Xinomavro-based wines of fellow OPAP region Naousa, the wine experts at WSET note that the Agiorgitiko-based wines of Nemea tend to have a more "international style" which may enhance the potential of Greek wines on the international market.

== Synonyms ==
Over the years, Agiorgitiko has been known under various synonyms including: Aghiorghitico, Aigeorgitiko, Mavro (Black or Dark), Mavro Nemeas (in Nemea), Mavronemeas, Mavrostaphylo Mavraki, Mavroudi Nemeas, Nemeas Mavro, Nemeas Mavroudi and Saint George.
