= Savatiano =

Variety of grape

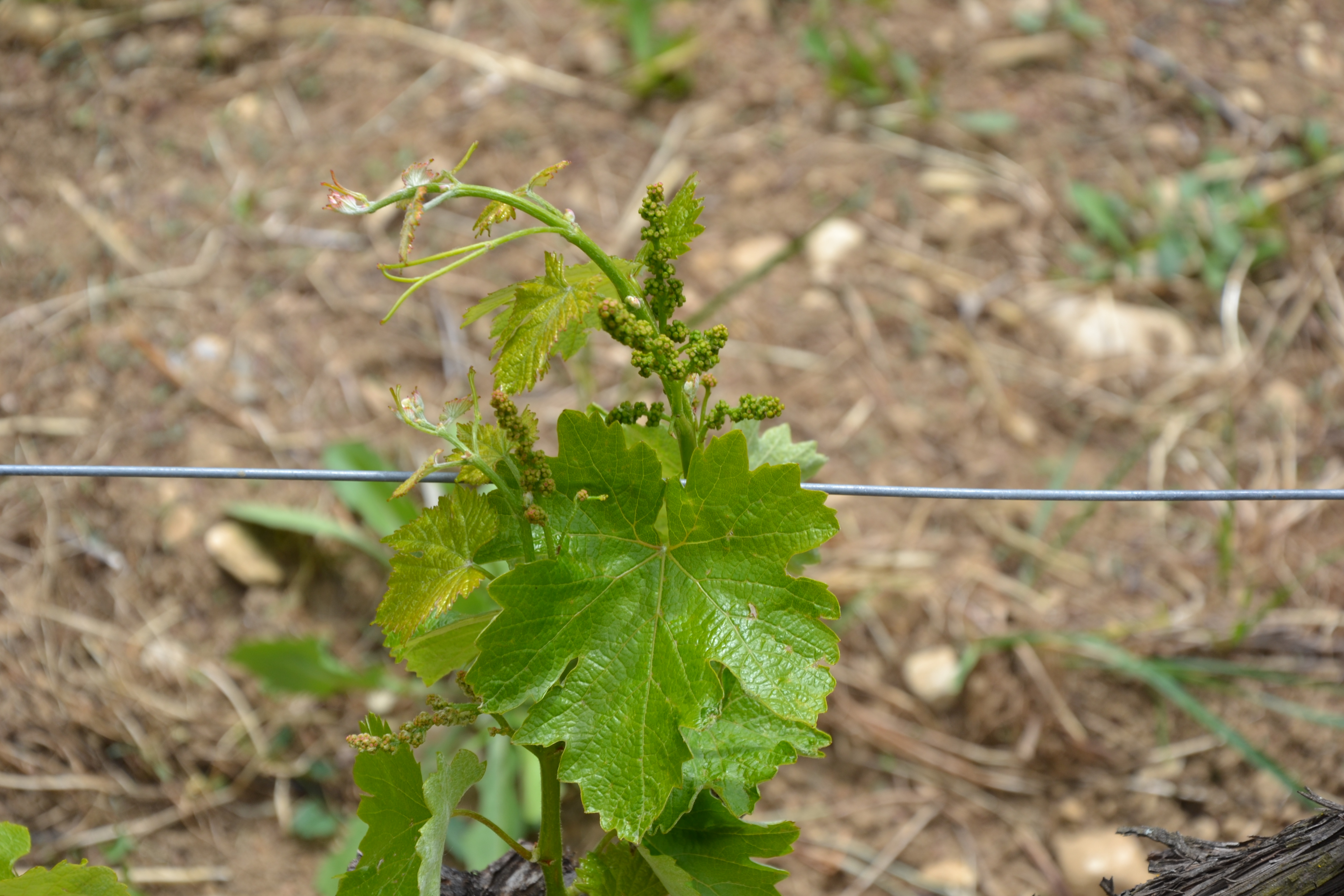
Leaves of a Savatiano varietal.

Savatiano (or Savvatiano) is a white Greek wine grape used primarily in the wine Retsina. It is one of Greece's most widely planted grape varieties and is known for its resistance to drought condition. It is mostly planted throughout central Greece, particularly in Attica near Athens. In Retsina, the naturally low acidity of the grape is sometimes compensated for by the addition of Assyrtiko and Rhoditis in the blend.

== Wine regions ==
In addition to Attica, the grape is also found in Euboea and the Bulgarian town of Pomorie which used to be a Greek colony known as Anchialos. While Assyrtiko is the most commonly blending partner for Savatiano in Attica, Rhoditis is used most commonly on Euboea and Pomorie. In Kantza, a village east of Paiania, a single varietal style of Savatiano is made without the Aleppo pine resin found in Retsina.

== Synonyms ==
Savvatiano has numerous synonyms such as Savvathiano, Dombrena Aspri, Doumpraina Aspri, Tsoumprena, Perachoritis, Sakeiko, Kountoura Aspri, etc.
