= Lagorthi =

Variety of grape

Lagorthi is a white Greek wine grape, well known despite its fairly small planting. It produces a moderately aromatic wine with relatively low fruit and alcohol content.

The variety is grown in only a few vineyards, mainly in northern Peloponnesus and on some of the Ionian Islands. As it is sensitive to water stress, some plantings have been made further north, in Macedonia, to assess its suitability for cooler but wetter climates. It is however relatively vigorous and resistant to disease. The grapes, which mature late (around late September), have thick skins and a fairly low juice content, and have an unusual ability to mature fully even at low sugar levels.

A handful of producers bottle well-regarded wines, including a few varietals. The pioneering producer in the quality wine market was Constantinos Antonopoulos, in the late 1980s.
