= Wine and Vine Institutes =

Greek wine research organizations

The Wine Institute and Vine Institute are two related organizations based in Athens, Greece, under the aegis of the country's Ministry of Agriculture. They are devoted to researching Greek wine and to preserving and improving the country's winemaking.

The Wine Institute was founded in 1937 but was largely inactive until the 1960s when it was involved in writing the first drafts of Greece's wine legislation. Since then, the Wine Institute has been primarily concerned with identifying and preserving indigenous grape varieties and strains of yeast, particularly rare ones. The Vine Institute has focused on studying the effects of different promising combinations of vines and terroir in order to provide a resource of information for Greek winemakers.
