= Negoska =

Variety of grape

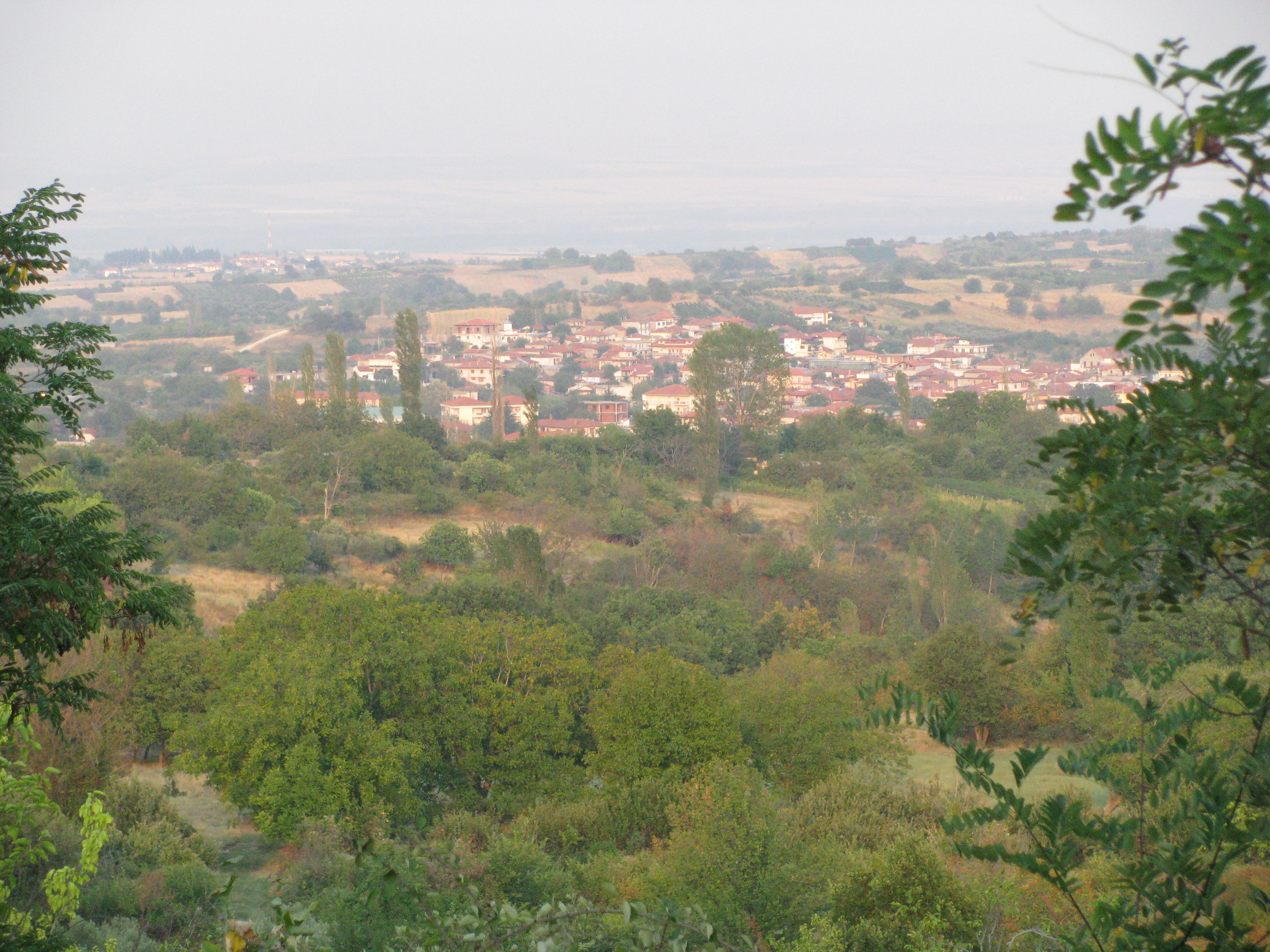
Negoska is grown around the town of Goumenissa in Greece(pictured) where it is often blended with Xynomavro.

Negoska is a red Greek wine grape variety (Negushka) that is grown primarily in Central Macedonia. Around the town of Goumenissa the grape is blended with Xynomavro to produce very fruity wines with high alcohol levels.

== Wine styles ==
According to wine expert Oz Clarke, Negoska is capable of producing soft, full-bodied red wines with many rich fruit flavors. The grape can have low to moderate acidity levels and is often blended with more acidic and tannic Xynomavro grape.

== Synonyms ==
Over the years Negoska has been known under a variety of synonyms including Goumenissas Mavro, Mavro Goumenissas, Neghotska, Negotska, Negotska Popolka and Popolka Naoussis.
