= Malagousia =

Variety of grape

- Grape (Vitis)
- Color of berry skin: Blanc
- Species: Vitis vinifera
- Also called: see list of synonyms
- Origin: Greece
- VIVC number: 7158

Malagousia or Malagouzia (Greek Μαλαγουζιά) is a white Greek wine grape that was virtually extinct until Professor of Oenology Vassilis Logothetis re-discovered it in Nafpaktia and presented it to one of his students, Vangelis Gerovassiliou, in the 1970s. Experimental vinification began at the Porto Carras winery, and later continued on Vangelis Gerovassiliou's own estate. The grape is highly aromatic and has the potential to produce soft, elegant wines.

== Synonyms ==
Malagousia is also known under the synonyms Malagouzia, Malagoyzia, Malaouzia, Malaoyzia, Melaouzia, and Melaoyzia.

It may also be related to Malvasia.
