= Lefki =

Lefki may refer to several places in Greece:

- Lefki, Ithaca, a village on the Strait of Ithaca
- Lefki, Karditsa, a village in the Karditsa regional unit, part of the municipal unit Fyllo
- Lefki, Kastoria, a village in the Kastoria regional unit, part of the municipal unit Agia Triada
- Lefki, Larissa, a village of the Elassona municipality
- Lefki, Lasithi, a municipality in Lasithi, Crete
- an alternative name of Koufonisi, Crete, an archipelago south of Crete
- a village in Evmoiro, Xanthi, Greece
