= Greek wine =

Wine making in Greece

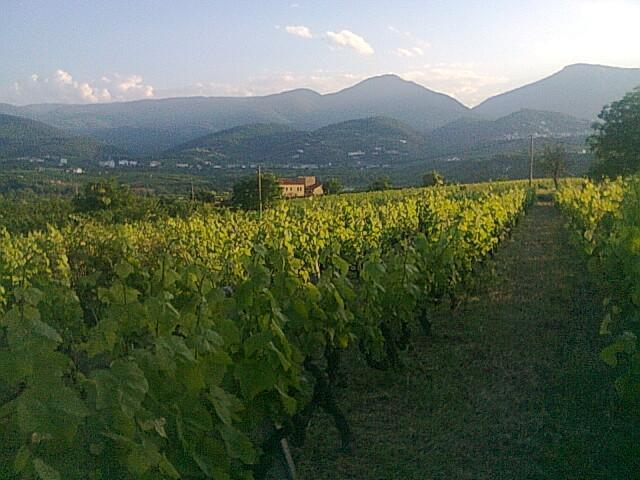
Vineyard in Naoussa, central Macedonia

Greece is one of the oldest wine-producing regions in the world and among the first wine-producing territories in Europe. The earliest evidence of Greek wine has been dated to 6,500 years ago where wine was produced on a household or communal basis. In ancient times, as trade in wine became extensive, it was transported from end to end of the Mediterranean; Greek wine had especially high prestige in Italy under the Roman Empire. In the medieval period, wines exported from Crete, Monemvasia and other Greek ports fetched high prices in northern Europe. The Greek wine production reached 1.65 million hectoliters in the 2025-26 season.

== History ==
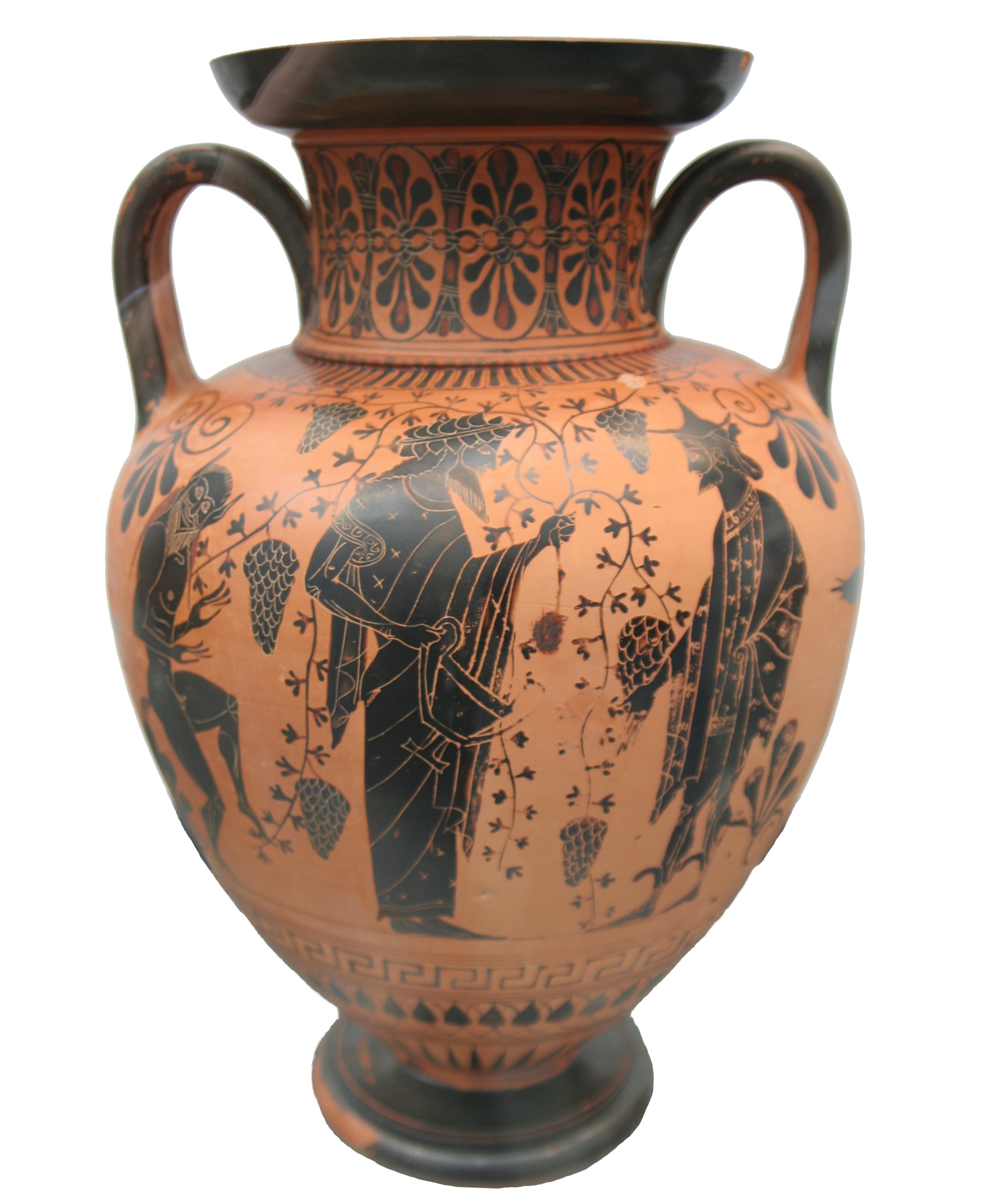
Dionysus with Hermes, a silenus and grapes

The origins of wine-making in Greece go back 6,500 years and evidence suggesting wine production confirm that Greece is home to the second oldest known grape wine remnants discovered in the world and the world's earliest evidence of crushed grapes. As Greek civilization spread through the Mediterranean, wine culture followed. The Ancient Greeks introduced vines such as Vitis vinifera and made wine in their numerous colonies in Italy, Sicily, southern France, and Spain.

In 1937, a Wine Institute was established by the Ministry of Agriculture. During the 1960s, retsina suddenly became the national beverage. With rapidly growing tourism, retsina became associated worldwide with Greece and Greek wine. Greece's first Cabernet Sauvignon vineyard was planted in 1963. In 1971 and 1972, legislation established appellation laws. The National Wine Tourism Council (ETHEPO), which was established in 2021, convened for the first time in May 2024.

== Wine regions ==
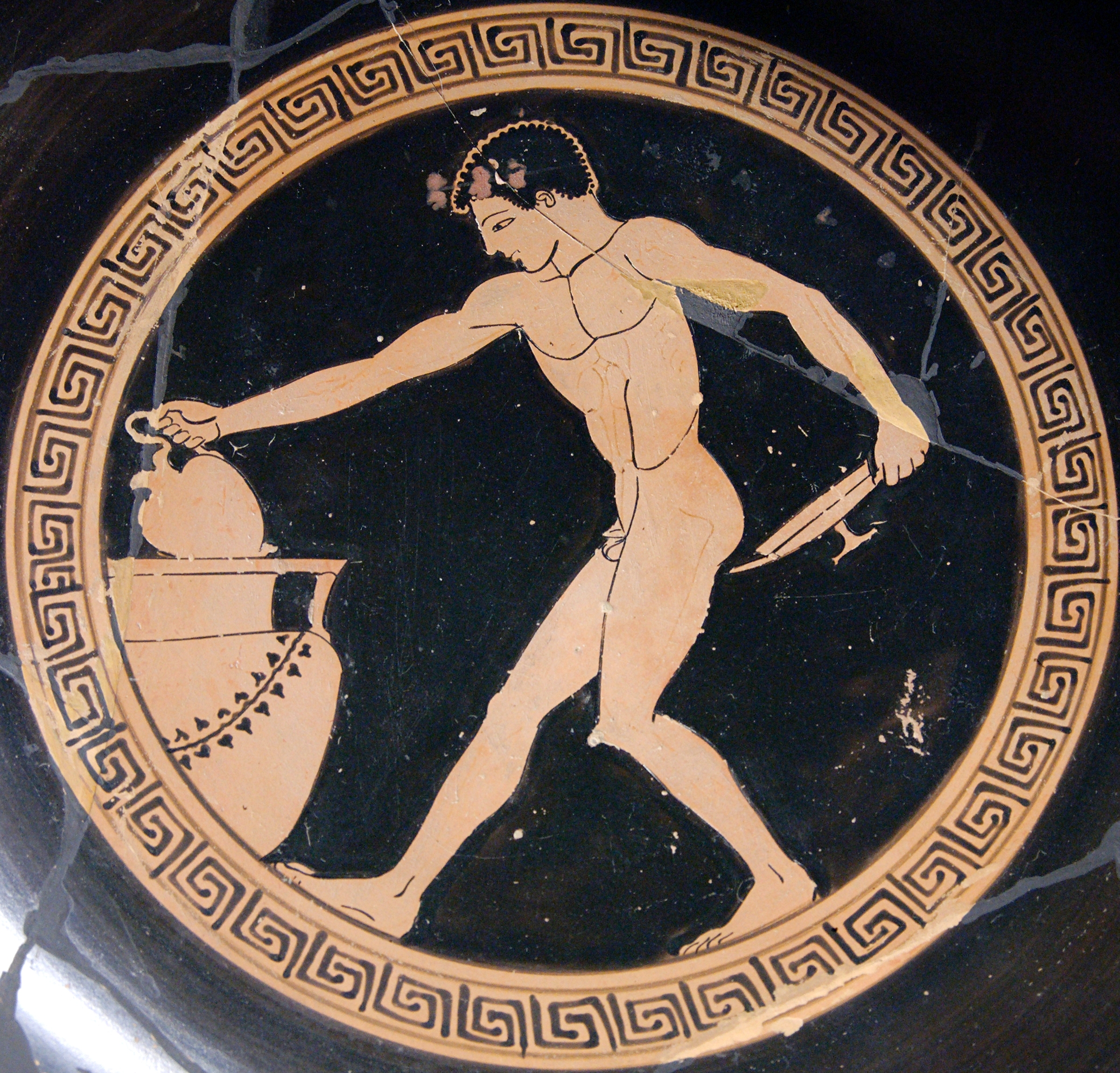
Wine boy at a symposium

A system of appellations was implemented to assure consumers the origins of their wine purchases. The appellation system categorizes wines as:

- Protected Geographical Origins (P.D.O), i.e. an Appellation of Origin of Superior Quality
- Protected Geographical Identification (P.G.I.), i.e. a Quality wines of Origin
- Epitrapezios Oinos, i.e. a vin de table – Not certified wine in a region of Greece (that does not reflect the real wine quality)
  - Epitrapezios Oinos, regular table wine which usually comes in screw-top containers
  - Cava, more prestigious, aged "reserve" blends (minimum aging: one year for whites; two years for reds)
  - Retsina, a traditional wine, flavored with pine resin

Viticulture and wine production is one of the local monks' traditional occupations in the Mount Athos. The Protected Geographical Indication (PGI)-certified Mount Athos wines were among the first PGI wines to be designated in Greece.

The main wine growing regions – so called appellations of Greece – are:

=== Aegean Islands ===
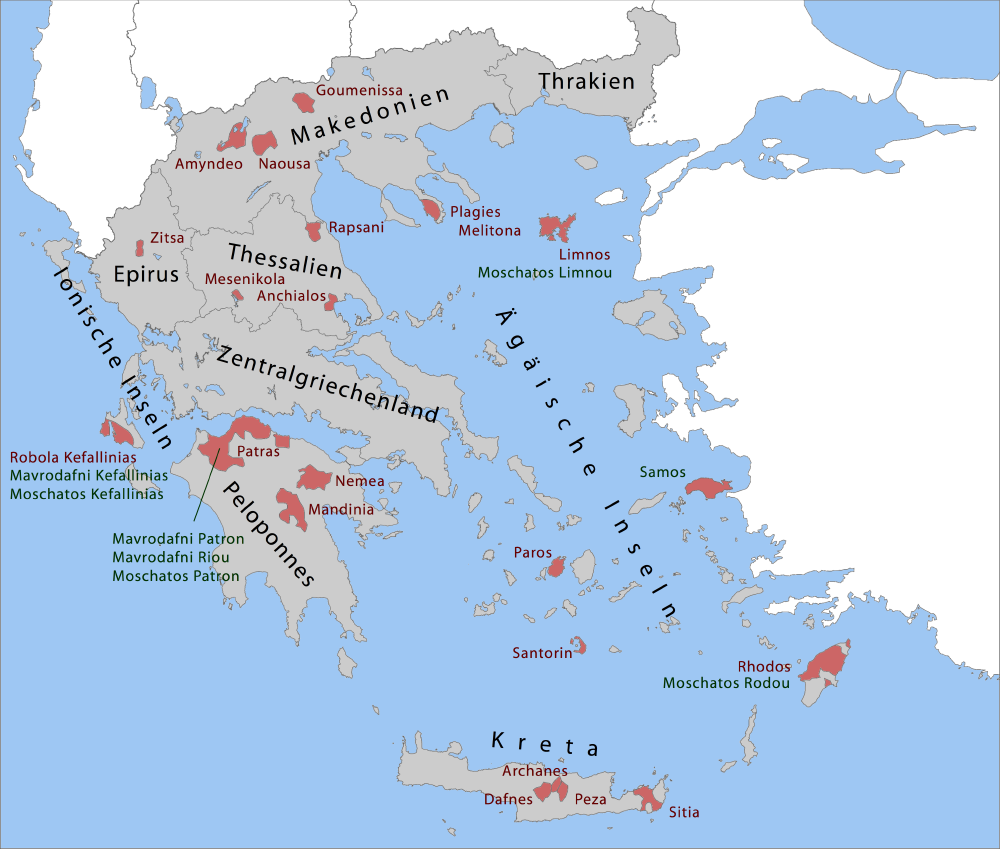
Greek wine regions

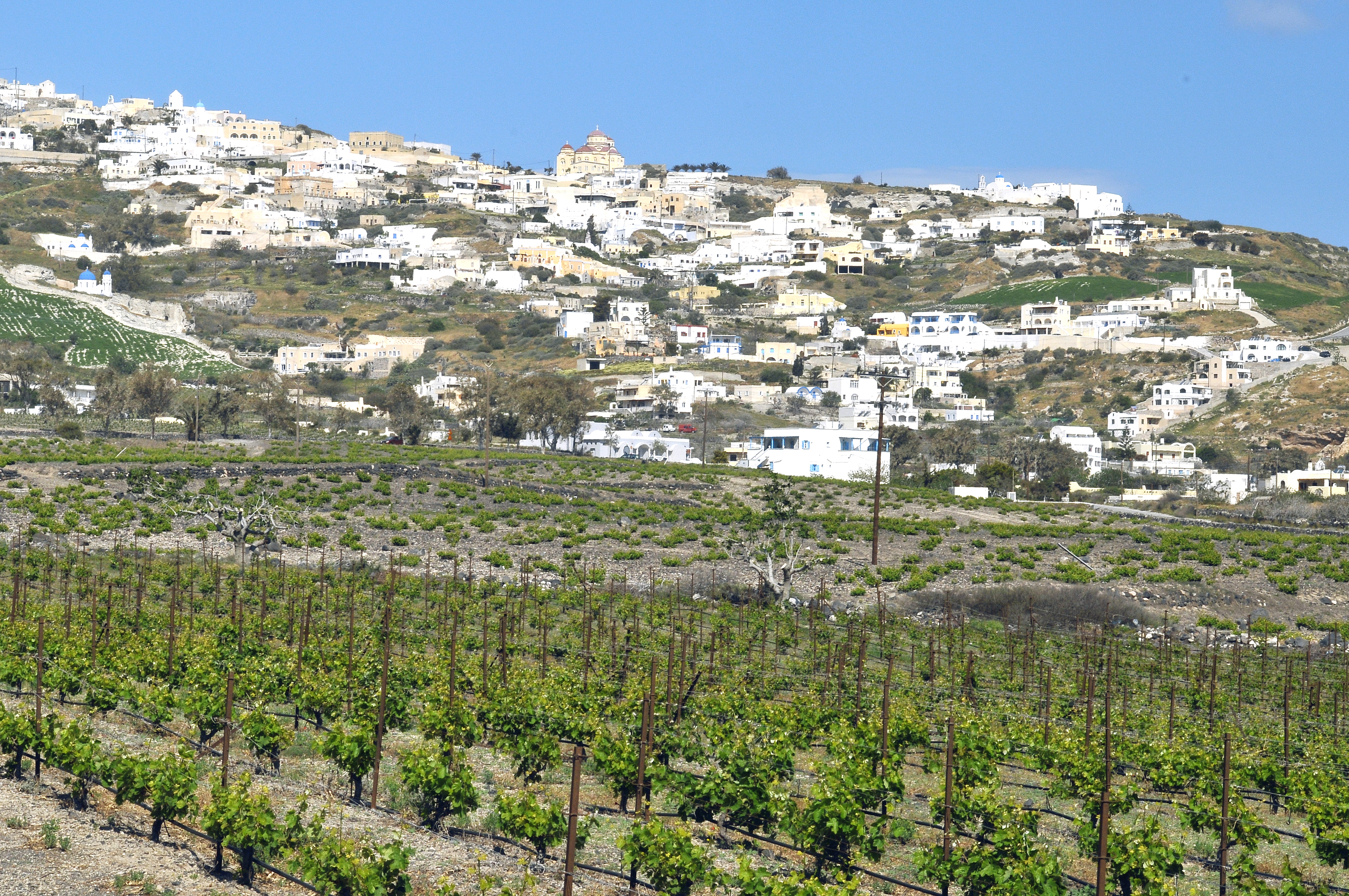
Vineyard in Santorini

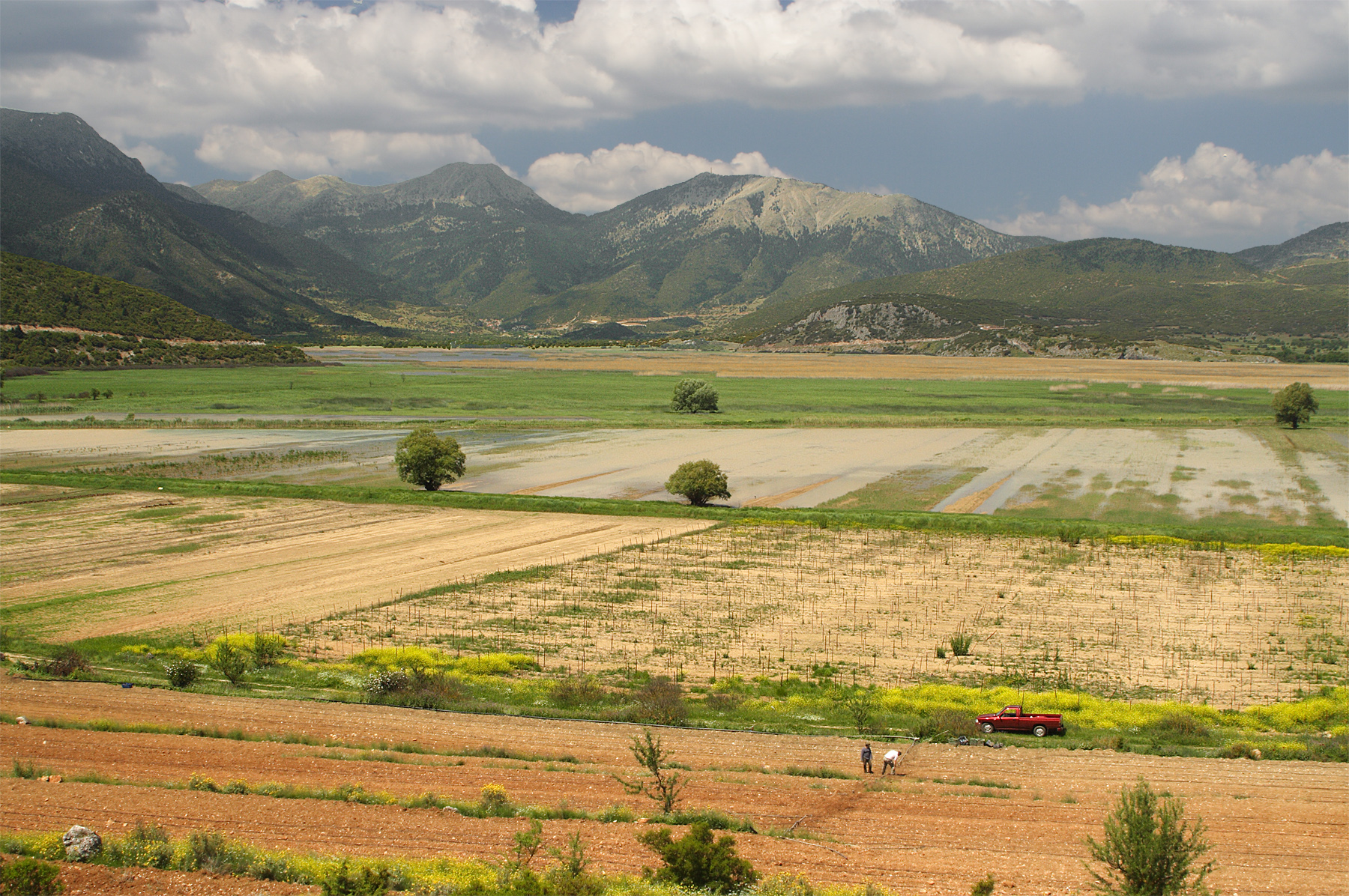
A vineyard in Peloponnese

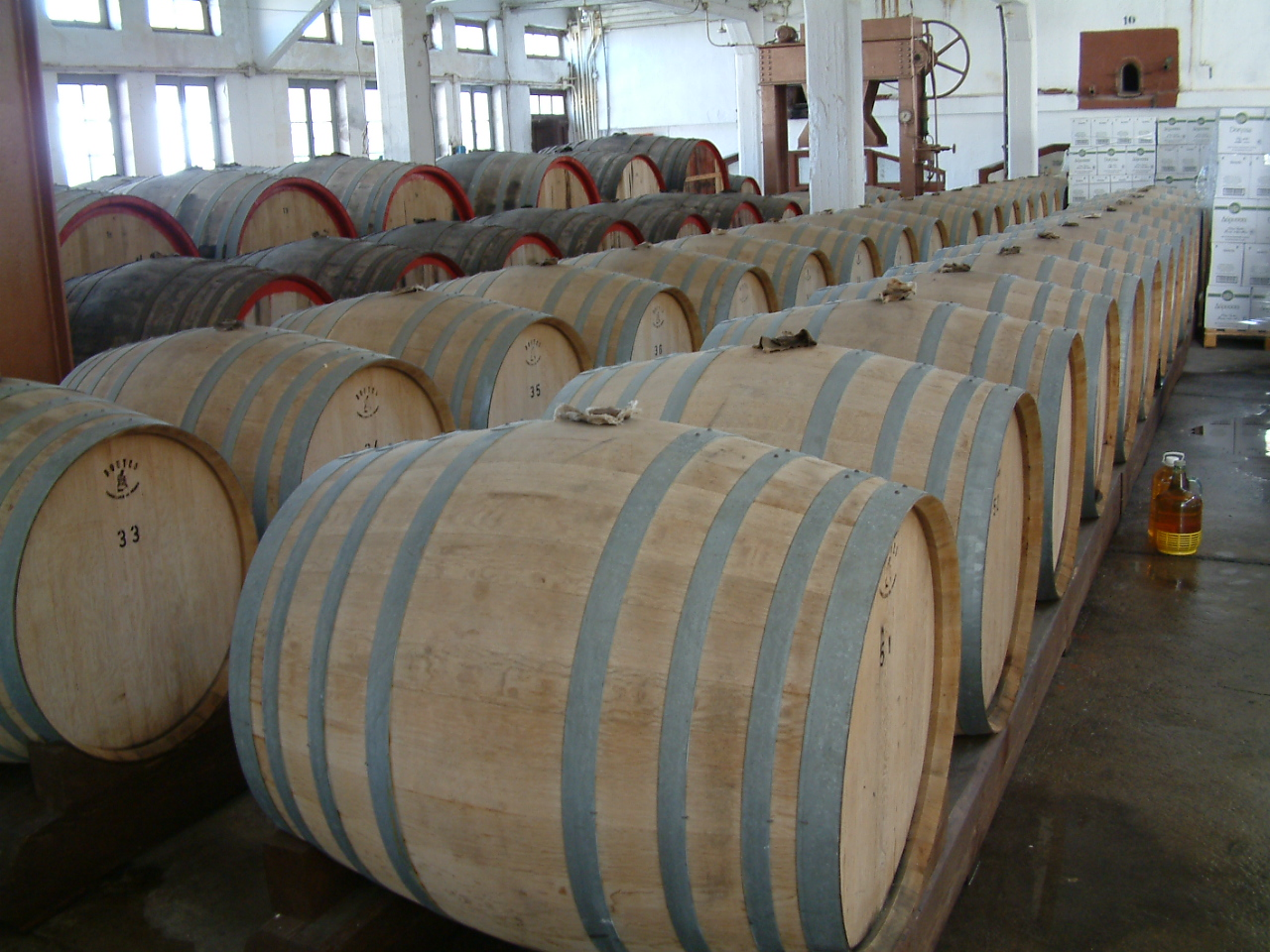
Wine barrels in Samos

- Lemnos
- Paros
- Rhodes
- Samos
- Santorini

=== Crete ===
- Archanes
- Dafnes
- Peza
- Sitia

=== Epirus ===
- Zitsa
- Metsovo

=== Ionian Islands ===
- Kefalonia
- Corfu
- Zakynthos
- Lefkada

=== Macedonia ===
- Amyntaio (Amyndeon)
- Epanomi
- Goumenissa
- Naoussa
- Pieria
- Chalkidiki

=== Central Greece ===
- Attica
- Atalanti

=== Peloponnese ===
- Mantineia
- Nemea
- Monemvassia-Malvasia
- Patras

=== Thessaly ===
- Nea Anchialos
- Rapsani
- Messenikola

== Grape varieties ==
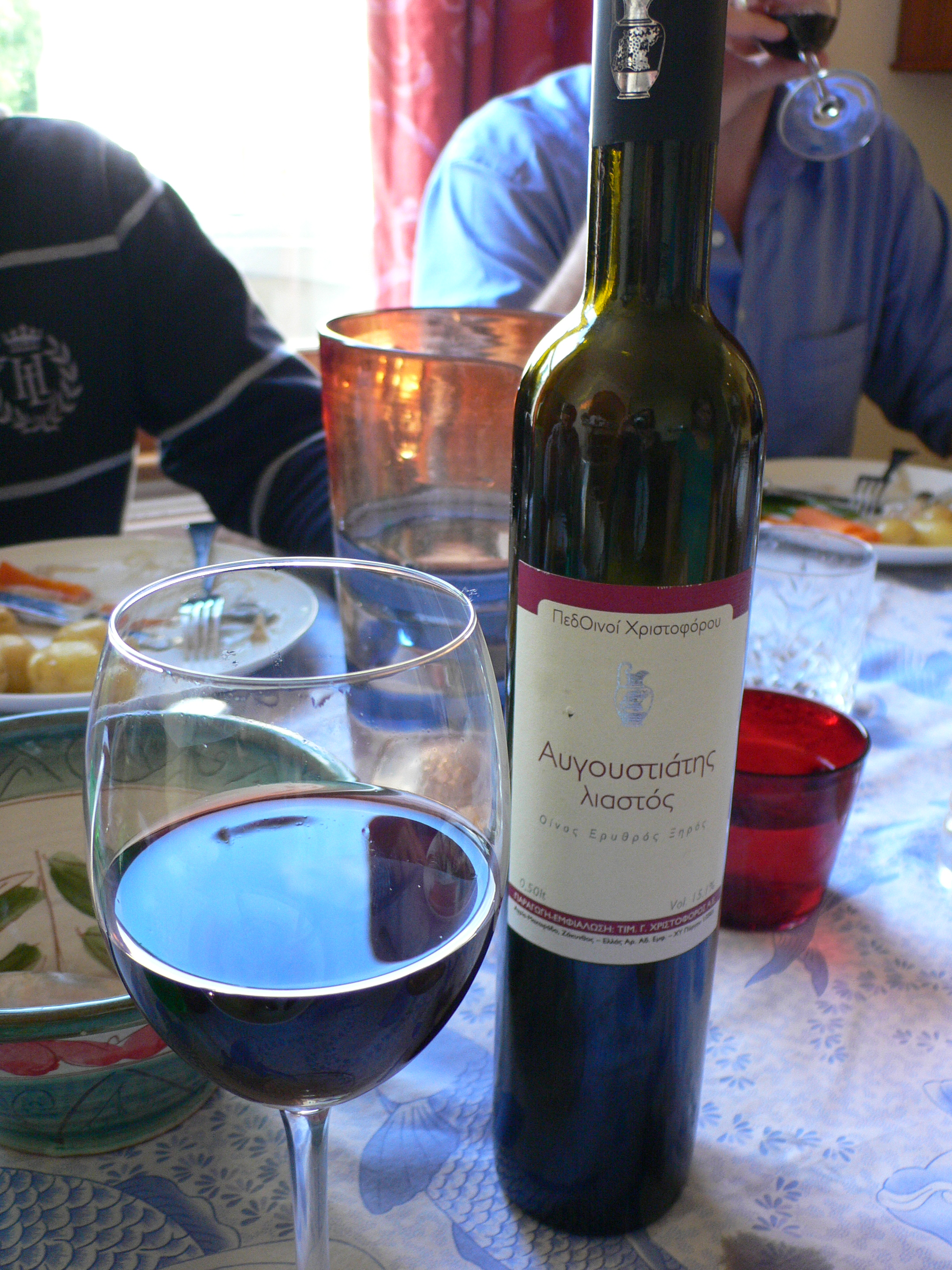
Red wine of Zakynthos

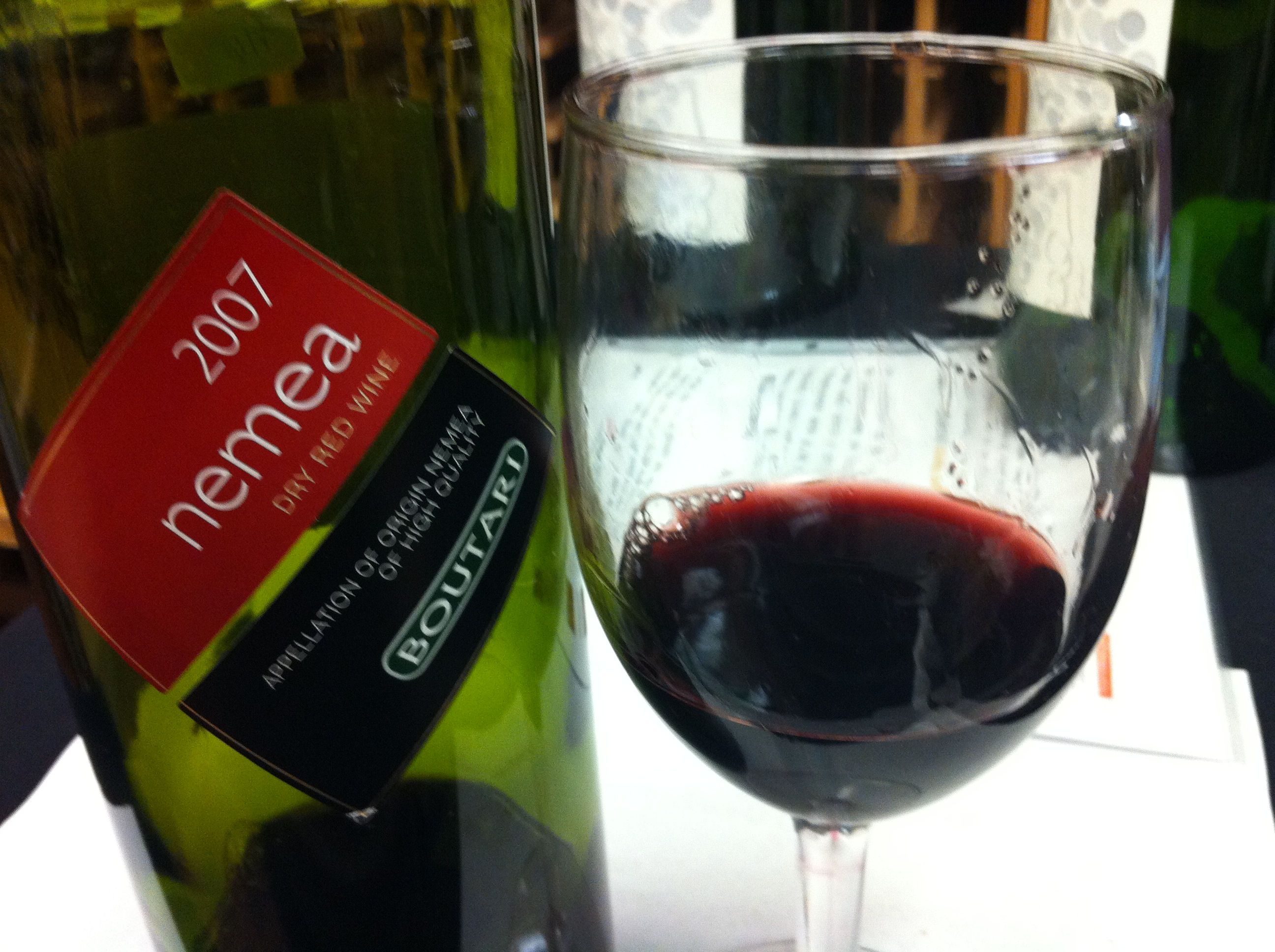
A Nemea wine made from 100% Agiorgitiko

Greece has approximately 200 vine varieties:

Red wine

- Agiorgitiko ("St. George's grape") is a variety native to Nemea that grows mainly in the Peloponnese area, producing a soft, fruity red in many styles. Its sensory attributes are similar to Beaujolais Nouveau but, unlike its French counterpart, the St. George ages well for about five years.
- Kotsifali is a variety mainly grown on Crete. It is blended with Mandilaria or Syrah to enhance its color.
- Liatiko is a red variety native to Crete. It is characterised by flavors of red fruit and spices, and is deemed to be at its best when made as a sweet wine. Historically, the grape was used in blends with Mandilaria and Kotsifali to produce Malvasia, a highly regarded, sweet red wine that was widely exported by Venetian traders during the Middle Ages.
- Limnio, or Kalambaki, is an important red grape variety that is indigenous to the Aegean island of Lemnos and has been used in red wine production for more than 2000 years. As a varietal wine, Limnio is full-bodied, high in alcohol and very herbaceous, with a distinctive taste of bay leaves.
- Mandilaria, also known as amorgiano, is mainly cultivated on the islands of Rhodes and Crete. Wine from this grape is often very tannic and frequently blended with other grapes to soften the mouthfeel.
- Mavrodaphne, or "black laurel", is a variety that grows in the Peloponnese and the Ionian Islands. It is blended with the Black Corinth currant grape to produce a prized fortified dessert wine made in the Solera style.
- Mavrotragano is one of the oldest red Greek varieties originating from the Cyclades and more specifically from the volcanic terroir of Santorini. It survived for centuries in its harsh and inhospitable lands and almost became extinct, due to the special treatment it needs during its cultivation.
- Mavroudi is one of the oldest Greek grape varieties and supposedly the one on which Odysseus got Polyphemus drunk. It is found in Thrace but also in central Greece and the Peloponnese but Mavroudi of Peloponnese is considered variant of Agiorgitiko and should not be confused with Mavroudi of Thrace. Also, studies have shown that it differs from Mavroudi in Cyprus and Mavrud from Bulgaria.
- Negoska is found in Northern Greece and also produces rose and red wines of carbonic maceration worth mentioning, with the expected aromas. blended into the PDO Goumenissa wine.
- Romeiko is a red grape generally found on Crete, most prominently in the region of Chania.
- Vertzami is a thick, dark-skinned grape variety, best known for single-varietal wines produced on the Ionian island of Lefkada. It is also grown in central Greece and Peloponnese, where it is often blended with other Greek wines, and Cyprus, where it is known as "Lefkas".
- Xinomavro ("sour black") is the predominant grape variety in Macedonia, centered on the town of Naousa. This variety has great aging potential with a palate reminiscent of tomatoes and olives, and a rich tannic character. It is often compared to Nebbiolo.

White wine

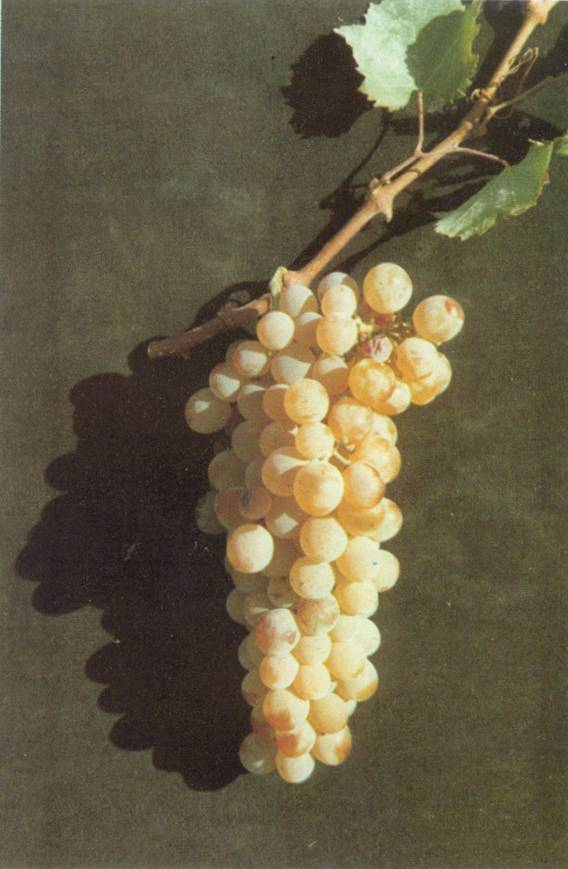
Assyrtiko grapes

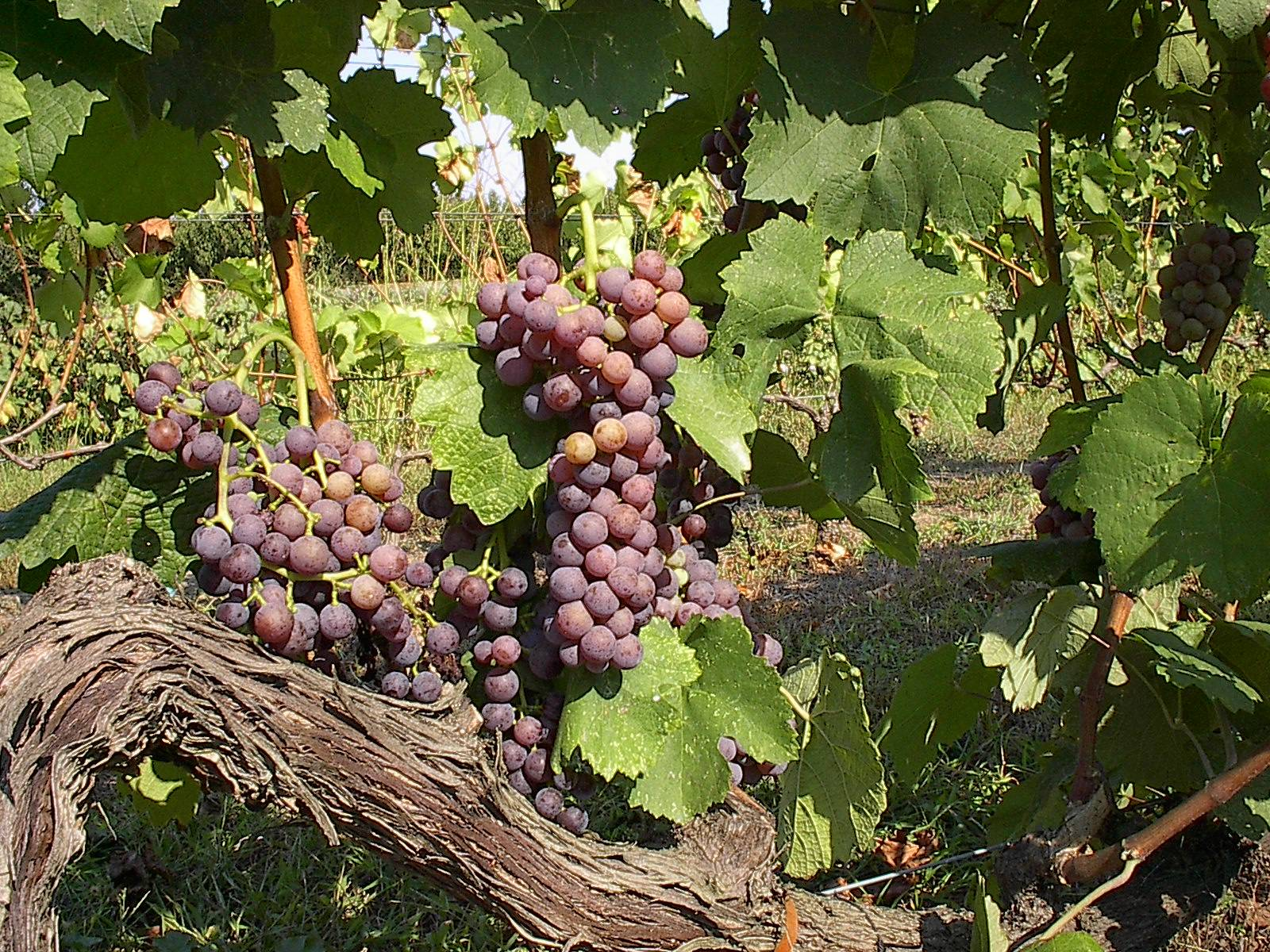
Moschofilero grapes

- Assyrtiko is a multi-purpose variety which maintains its acidity as it ripens. It is similar in character to Riesling, and is mostly island-based, being a native variety of the island of Santorini, whose old vines have been resistant to Phylloxera.
- Athiri is a lower acid variety and one of the most ancient. Originally from Santorini, it is now planted in Macedonia, Attica, and Rhodes.
- Debina is a white Greek wine grape primarily in the Zitsa region of Epirus. The grape's high acidity lends itself to sparkling wine production.
- Lagorthi is a variety mainly cultivated on high slopes (850 meters) in the Peloponnese. The grape produces a very malic and fruity wine.
- Malagousia is a grape growing mainly in Macedonia, with a special aroma leading to elegant full bodied wines, with medium-plus acidity and exciting perfumed aromas.
- Moschofilero is a Blanc de gris variety from the AOC region of Mantineia, in Arcadia in the Peloponnese. Its wines offer a crisp and floral character in both still and sparkling styles.
- Robola is most grown in the mountainous vineyards of the Ionian Island of Cephalonia. It has a smokey mineral and lemony character, excellently complementing seafood.
- Roditis (the "pink" or "rose" grape) is a grape that is very popular in Attica, Macedonia, Thessaly, and the Peloponnese. This variety produces elegant, light white wines with citrus flavors.
- Savatiano (the "Saturday" grape) is the predominant white grape in the region of Attica, where it displays excellent heat resistance and shows a distinct floral and fruity aroma when cold fermentation is practised. When fermented without cooling, it makes retsina or rustic unresinated wines that complement Mediterranean dishes well.
- Vidiano is a white grape indigenous to Crete. It has complex aromas of peach, apricot, melon, honey and herbs, along with moderate acidity. The grape is difficult to cultivate and is grown in small scale, chiefly around Rethymno and Heraklion.

== See also ==
- Winemaking
- Greek cuisine
- Legal drinking age
- Public intoxication
- List of smoking bans
- Agriculture in Greece
- Glossary of wine terms
- Wine and Vine Institutes
