= Romeiko =

Variety of grape

Romeiko (Greek: Ρωμαίικο or Ρωμέικο) is a red grape variety indigenous to Greece. Its name derives from the term Romios that is used to refer to modern Greeks (literally Roman as a citizen of the former Byzantine Empire).

Romeiko is an indigenous grape found on many Cycladic islands and Crete, prominently in the region of Chania and in particular Kissamos where it thrives. Romeiko vineyards are late maturing and high-yielding, producing high-Baumé must that is mixed with other varieties to give red, rosé and white wines. The pomace is distilled to produce Tsikoudia.

Kissamos, a red wine with 13% alcohol content, and Clos de Creta, a white wine, are both made from Romeiko grapes. Romeiko is often used to make the traditional marouvas wine, similar to a sherry.

DNA analysis has shown that the similarly named Marvoromaiko is actually an unrelated variety.
