= Athiri =

Variety of grape

- Grape (Vitis)
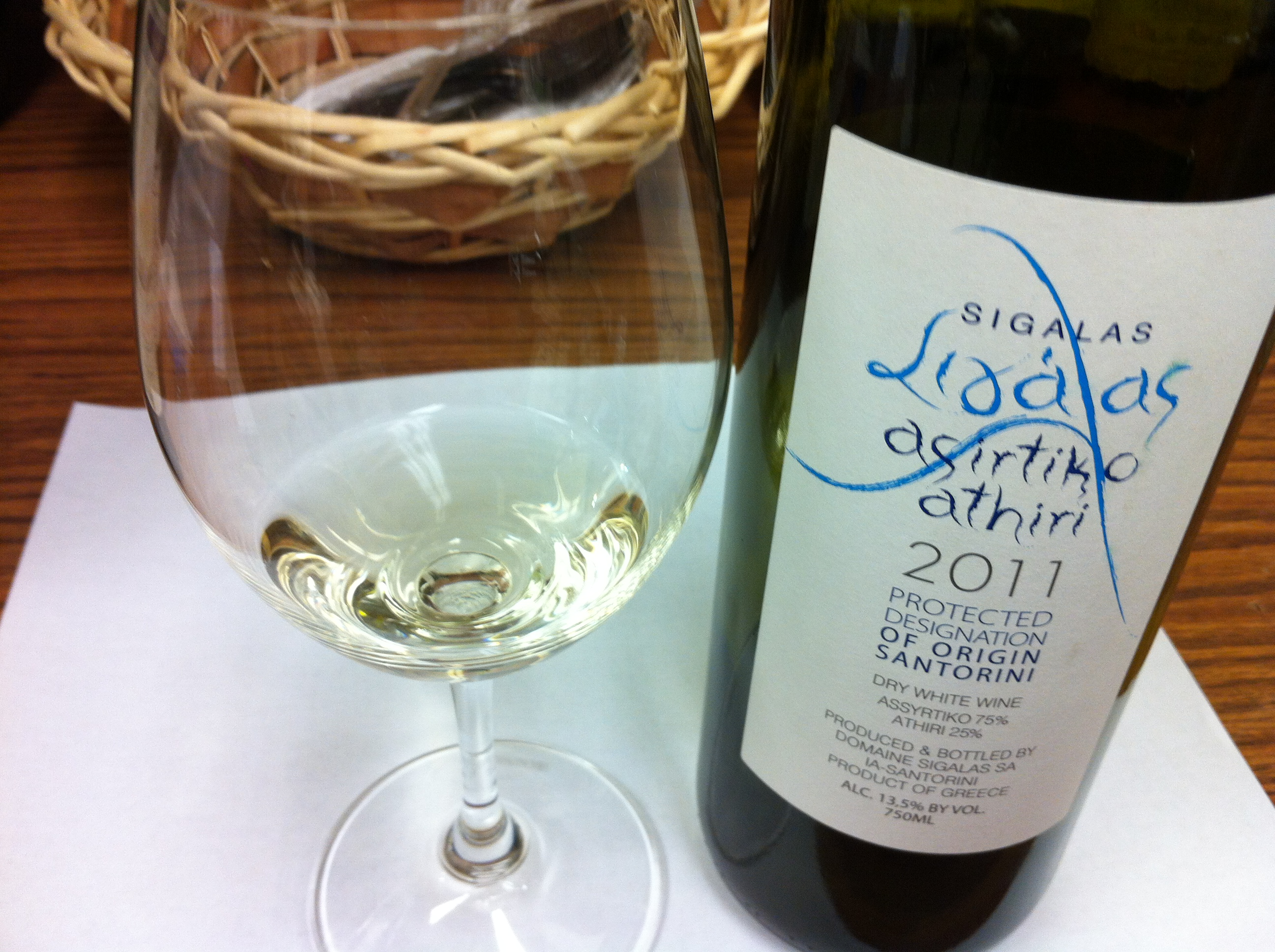
- Wine blend of Athiri and Assyrtiko
- Color of berry skin: Blanc
- Species: Vitis vinifera
- Also called: see list of synonyms
- Origin: Greece
- Notable regions: Rhodes
- Notable wines: Retsina
- VIVC number: 744

Athiri (Greek: Αθήρι) or Athiri Aspro is a white Greek wine grape used to make Retsina on the island of Rhodes.

The grape is noted for its lemon character and in other parts of Greece it is often blended with Assyrtiko. In other areas it is blended with Vilana and Ladikino.

Its close association with Rhodes has developed in the use of "Rhodes" as a synonym for the grape that can be appear on Greek wine labels.

== Synonyms ==
Athiri is also known under the synonyms Asprathiri, Asprathiro, Athiri Aspro, Athiri Lefko, and Athiri Leyko.
