= Kotsifali =

Greek wine grape found on Crete

- Grape (Vitis)
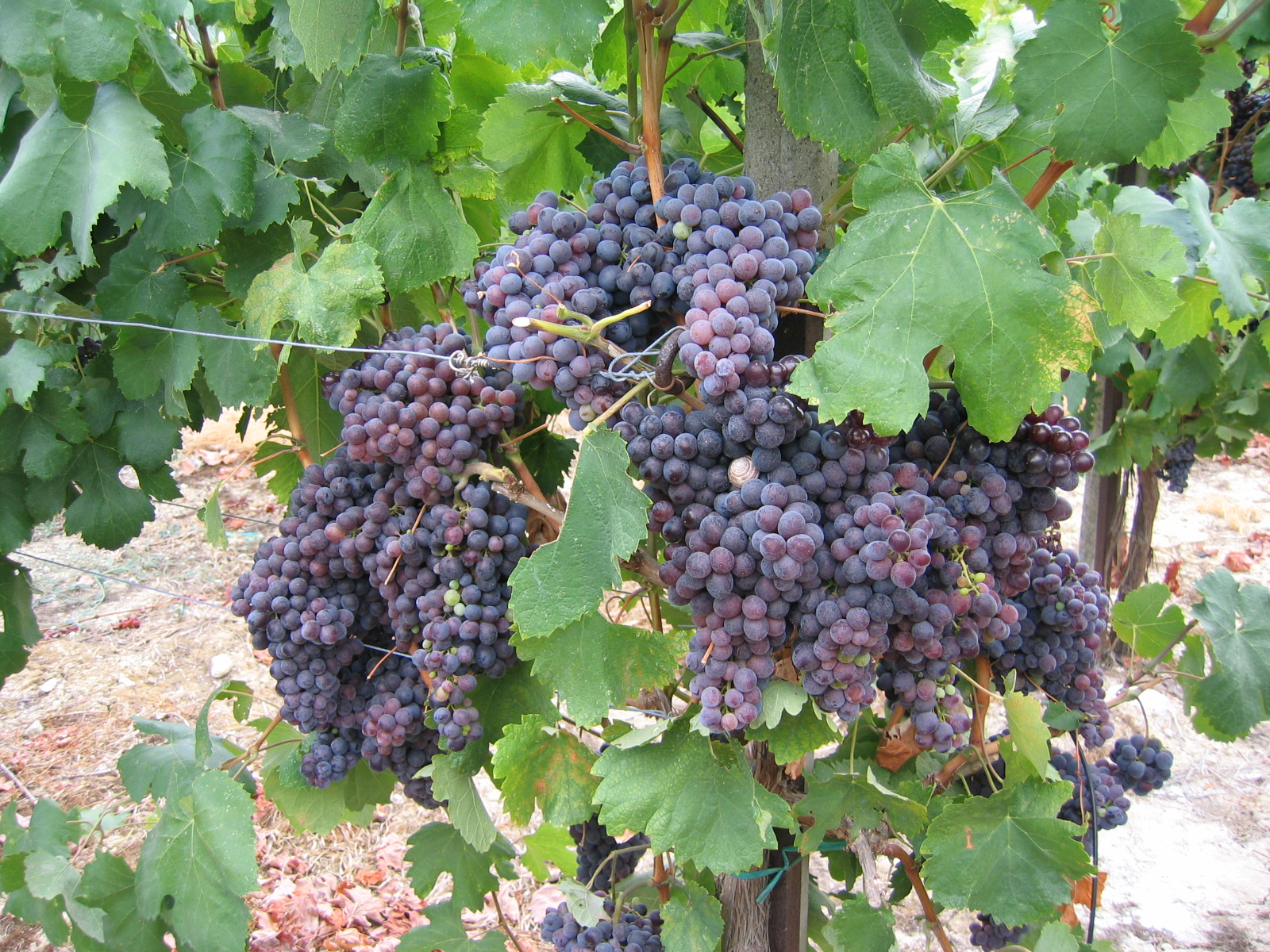
- Kotsifali growing in Crete
- Species: Vitis vinifera
- VIVC number: 6446

Kotsifali (Greek: Κοτσιφάλι) is a red Greek wine grape that is indigenous to the island of Crete. It is mainly grown in the Heraklion regional unit and sporadically on the Cyclades. The grape alone gives moderately red wine with high alcohol content and rich flavor. It is often blended with Mandilaria, yielding a ruby-colored dry wine with pleasant taste and aroma that requires minimal aging.
