= Vilana =

Variety of grape

- Grape (Vitis)
- Species: Vitis vinifera
- Also called: See list of synonyms
- Origin: Greece

Vilana (Greek: Βηλάνα) is a white Greek wine grape variety planted primarily in Crete. The grape is a difficult one to cultivate and produces delicate wines rarely seen outside Greece.

== Synonyms ==
Vilana is also known under the synonyms Belana and Velana.
