= Trikomo, Greece =

Trikomo Τρίκωμο
- Community

- Location within Greece
- Coordinates: 39°58.8′N 21°19′E
- Country: Greece
- Administrative region: Western Macedonia
- Regional unit: Grevena
- Municipality: Grevena
- Municipal unit: Theodoros Ziakas

Area
  - Community: 16.853 km^{2} (6.507 sq mi)
- Elevation: 784 m (2,572 ft)

Population (2021)
  - Community: 63
  - Density: 3.7/km^{2} (9.7/sq mi)
- Time zone: UTC+2 (EET)
  - Summer (DST): UTC+3 (EEST)

Trikomo (Greek: Τρίκωμο, before 1927: Ζάλοβο – Zalovo) is a settlement and a community in the municipal unit Theodoros Ziakas, in Grevena regional unit, Greece. The 2021 census gives its population as 63. The community has an area of 16.853 km^{2}.

== Notes ==
- Trikomo, Greece at GEOnet Names Server
