= Mandilaria =

Variety of grape

- Grape (Vitis)
- Color of berry skin: Noir
- Species: Vitis vinifera
- Also called: See list of synonyms
- Origin: Greece
- VIVC number: 7300

Mandilaria (Greek: Μαντηλαριά) is a red Greek wine grape variety that is grown throughout the Greek Isles. The grape is often used as a blending component, producing deeply colored wines that are light bodied.

== Synonyms ==
Mandilaria is also known under the synonyms Amorgiano, Amourguiano, Armorgiano, Dombrena Mavri, Domvrena Mavri, Doubraina Mavri, Doubrena Mavri, Doumbrena Mavri, Doumpraina Mavri, Doympraina Mavre, K'ntoura Kai M'ntoura, Kontoura, Koudoura Mavri, Koundour A Mavri, Koundoura Mavri, Kountoura, Kountoura Mavri, Kountoyro, Koutoura, Koyntoura, Koyntoura Mavre, Kytoura, Mandalari, Mandilari, Mantelaria, Mantilari, Mantilaria, Montoyra, and Tsoumpraina Mavri.
