= Byzantine cuisine =

Historical regional cuisine

Byzantine cuisine was the continuation of local ancient Greek cuisine, ancient Roman cuisine, and Mediterranean cuisine. Byzantine trading with foreigners brought in grains, sugar, livestock, fruits, vegetables, and spices that would otherwise be limited to specific geographical climates.

Cooks experimented with many new combinations of food, creating two styles in the process. These were the eastern (Asia Minor and the eastern Aegean), consisting of Byzantine cuisine supplemented by trade items, and a leaner style primarily based on local Greek cuisine culture.

== Diet ==
Byzantine food consumption varied by class, location and time period. The Imperial Palace was a metropolis of spices and exotic recipes; where guests were entertained with fruits, honey-cakes and syrupy sweetmeats.

With the location of Constantinople being situated between popular trade routes, Byzantine cuisine was augmented by cultural influences from several locales—such as Lombard Italy, the Sassanid Empire, and an emerging Muslim caliphate. The resulting melting pot continued during Ottoman times and therefore modern Turkish cuisine, Greek cuisine and Balkan cuisine have many similarities, and use a wide array of ingredients.

The Byzantines produced various cheeses, including anthotiro, kefalotyri and Feta. They also relished in a wide variety of shellfish and fish. They prepared eggs to make famous omelets — called sphoungata, i.e. "spongy" — mentioned by Theodore Prodromos. Every household also kept a supply of poultry. The Florentine chronicler Giovanni de Pigli reported variously prepared types of chicken, pigeons, salad, and eggs being served to the Emperor John VIII Palaiologos during his visit to Florence in 1439. During the Middle Byzantine period, it seems that meat consumption increased while bread consumption decreased.

Byzantine citizens obtained other kinds of meat by hunting animals like deer and wild boar, a favourite and distinguished occupation of men. They usually hunted with dogs and hawks, though sometimes employed trapping, netting, and bird-liming. Larger animals were a more expensive and rare food. Citizens slaughtered pigs at the beginning of winter to provide their families with sausages, salt pork, and lard for the year. Only upper-middle and higher class Byzantines could afford lamb. They seldom ate beef, as they used cattle to cultivate the fields.

Middle and lower class citizens in cities such as Constantinople and Thessaloniki consumed the offerings of the taverna. The most common form of cooking was boiling. Garos was a fermented fish sauce in all its varieties was especially favored as a condiment along with the umami flavoring murri, a fermented barley sauce, and the fermented soy product soy sauce. Liutprand of Cremona, the ambassador to Constantinople from Otto I, described being served food covered in an "exceedingly bad fish liquor," a reference to garos.

=== Religious influence on diet ===
The rise and influence of Orthodox Christianity in turn had influences on the Byzantine diet, with the introduction and incorporation of fasting. Fasting, in Orthodox religious law, was the act of not partaking in the consumption of animal products such as dairy, meats, fish (with exceptions being certain types of shellfish and roe), and eggs. However, the foods that were permitted for the 180 days of fasting were any types of vegetables, fruits, honey, oil, grains, as well as any wild herbs people could find.

Within the monasteries the drinking and eating habits differed that that of what was common in the palaces or cities. Monasteries would often practice food equality, meaning the menus of monks and nuns would be different depending on if it was a fasting period, a non-fasting period, or a holiday. On non-fasting days both groups would share two meals together, while on fasting days they would be served bread with diluted wine and assorted legumes. The act of eating together was to emphasis an act of harmony and companionship, while also influencing a feeling of simplicity and humility within the monastery.

=== Grains ===
The two main grains in Byzantine Anatolia were wheat and barley. Barley has a relatively low nutritional value, and in the Byzantine world it was valued less than wheat and sold for a lower price. Rye, millet, oats, and vetch were primarily cultivated as animal fodder and were not preferred for human consumption. Millet in particular was not prized by Byzantine authors - Anna Komnene, for example, called it the "food of barbarians". It was used to make gruel and porridge such as trachanas (τραχανάς), and Symeon Seth also mentions poor people eating millet mixed with milk.

Bread played a major part in the Byzantine diet. The most valued bread was made from "finely sieved" wheat flour with no other grains mixed in. Besides wheat and barley, bread was made using rye, millet, egg yolks, and chickpeas. Bulgur was also eaten.

=== Meat ===
Meat was not a luxury food in Byzantine times – most people could afford to eat it relatively often. If the typikon of the monastery of St. John the Baptist is anything to go by, a typical Byzantine citizen might eat about two and a half pounds of meat in a single day. The Prodromic poems also describe a cobbler eating meat for four meals in one day: tripe for breakfast, boiled meat for lunch, then meat cooked in wine for the third meal, and finally a hot pot for the fourth. Fresh meat, however, was mostly eaten by the wealthy, while poorer citizens ate more salted meat. Dried and salted meat was one of the basic rations served to Byzantine soldiers.

The Byzantines seem to have especially liked fatty meat. Many meat dishes were cooked in large amounts of fat. Meat from livestock was preferred over game meat. Meat from young animals was especially preferred. Diverse animal bones found at Corinth, dated to sometime after the mid-1200s, indicate that a wide range of meats was eaten during the Late Byzantine period.

The single most common preserved meat was salted pork. Pork was also used as a source of lard and fat, as well as to make sausages. Different types of sausages, such as allantia and saltsikia, are mentioned in contemporary texts. The hagiography of Symeon the Holy Fool also mentions bacon and a type of fried sausage eaten with mustard. At the archaeological site of Gritille in eastern Turkey, pig bones made up nearly half of the total animal remains, while at other sites it was higher. Pork butchers had their own regulatory laws in Section 16 of the Book of the Eparch.

Beef, on the other hand, was less commonly eaten than pork, sheep, or goat because cattle were mostly used for working in the fields instead. Meat from adult male goats was considered unappetizing by most Byzantines.

Many different birds were eaten. The most common, based on animal bone finds at Corinth, was chicken. Poultry was aged by hanging the bird carcasses up to enhance their taste and texture.

Meat was cooked in a variety of ways. It was either roasted, grilled, boiled, steamed, or marinated in water with salt and herbs. Innards were boiled or fried. As well as, intestines of animals would sometimes be used to make Kokoretsi. Poorer households would also boil the heads and feet of animals.

==== Butchery Practices ====
Cattle, sheep, and goats were not often slaughtered when they were at later stages of life as it was often seen as low quality meat by many, they were often kept alive because of their secondary products like milk and wool. However pigs were often slaughtered at their later ages when they were fully grown when they started to out-profit fodder costs, along with this many vegetarians in the Mediterranean did not like pig husbandry so pork became a luxury meat within the empire. Along with this, the butchery of young animals also became a luxury in more of the inland regions of the empire.

=== Seafood ===
In some regions, fish and seafood formed another important source of animal protein. Near the sea or rivers, fresh fish was prepared and consumed; however cities farther away from seas or rivers, fish was prepared to be dried, salted, or smoked. Before being preserved this way, the fish was marinated in water mixed with salt and thyme. Other methods of cooking fish included boiling, frying, baking, grilling, and roasting, as well as being served with a sauce.

Dried fish was eaten by soldiers on expeditions. Sturgeon was eaten by wealthier households.

The Prodromic poems also depict an "unusual" dish of a fish stew with cheeses, as well as a different dish involving fish seasoned with cloves, cinnamon, and other spices. Poorer urban households also ate tarichos (τάριχος) – salted, pickled fish sold by grocers instead of fishmongers.

=== Non-meat animal products ===
Non-meat animal products like eggs and dairy were relatively cheap and provided an important source of nutrients. Many different types of eggs were eaten, including chicken, goose, duck, partridge, and pheasant. They could be scrambled or made into omelets called sphoungata. The Prodromic poems mention a dish like this made with onions and other seasonings. In Byzantine culture, eggs were considered food for people who were sick or fasting.

Cheese, another popular food, was derived from cows, sheep, goats, or water buffalo. It came in various kinds, both hard and soft. Paphlagonian cheese was a popular variety eaten in Constantinople. The Prodromic poems also describe Cretan and Vlach cheese, as well as a kind of soft mountain cheese that probably refers to cottage cheese. Cheese could also be curdled, using rennet, fig juice and leaves, or artichokes. It could also be breaded with crumbs or meal and then fried in hot oil.

Milk in Byzantine was often cultivated from cattle, sheep, and goats, people would also drank milk fairly commonly. It was considered best to drink it warm, so it was often heated. People would also drink milk straight from the animal.

Fats like butter and lard were used as a substitute for olive oil in colder inland regions that could not support olive tree cultivation. They were also used as preservatives and, especially in rugged inland areas such as the Mecitözü valley, eaten by themselves.

Beehives from Byzantine Greeks allowed citizens to procure and sell honey on a large scale. The use of honey was noted in a variety of cooking, pastry and tea recipes. In 1152 a tax was introduced on beekeeping.

Goats and sheep were raised and used for their wool, sheep's wool was used for mattresses while goats hair was used for rope making and bag making as it was naturally water and tear resistant.

=== Sweets ===
Honey was used as the main sweetener. Cane sugar was also introduced during the Middle Byzantine period, but it was still a luxury product.

Many scholars state that Byzantine koptoplakous (Medieval Greek: κοπτοπλακοῦς) and plakountas tetyromenous are the ancestors of modern baklava and tiropita (börek) respectively. Both variants descended from the ancient Greek Placenta cake.

== Drink ==
Macedonia was renowned for its wines, served for upper class Byzantines. During the crusades and after, Western Europeans valued costly Byzantine wines. The most famous example is the still extant Commandaria wine from Cyprus served at the wedding of King Richard the Lionheart. Other renowned varieties were Cretan wines from muscat grapes, Romania or Rumney (exported from Methoni in the western Peloponnese), and Malvasia or Malmsey (likely exported from Monemvasia). Retsina, wine flavored with pine resin, was also drunk, as it still is in Greece today, producing similar reactions from unfamiliar visitors, "To add to our calamity the Greek wine, on account of being mixed with pitch, resin, and plaster was to us undrinkable," complained Liutprand of Cremona, who was the ambassador sent to Constantinople in 968 by the German Holy Roman Emperor Otto I.

== Nutrition ==
Archaeological studies in central Anatolia indicate that the average Byzantine peasant household was more or less self-sufficient in food supplies, and their diet would have been relatively well-balanced. There were sufficient carbohydrates (from bread and grains) and vegetable proteins (from legumes), as well as lower but still sufficient amounts of animal-based proteins. Vitamins and minerals, derived from seasonal and pickled vegetables, fruits, and nuts, were lower but still "minimally sufficient". Additionally, wine also provided additional calories. Historian Angeliki Laiou posits that the average Byzantine peasant household produced enough to support themselves beyond self sufficiency, while urban labourers earned enough to sustain their livelihoods. This diet would have been relatively high in fiber but low in things like calcium, vitamin B12, and folic acid.

== Food preservation ==
Food preservation was seen as a necessity in the Byzantine empire to create surplus and maintain freshness for foods crossing trade routes. Methods of food preservation include smoking, pressing, salting, drying and sealing contents in dry areas. Both nuts and fruits were sun dried. Alcohol and smoke were used to disinfect products so bacteria wouldn’t grow and cause rot.

== Tableware and customs ==
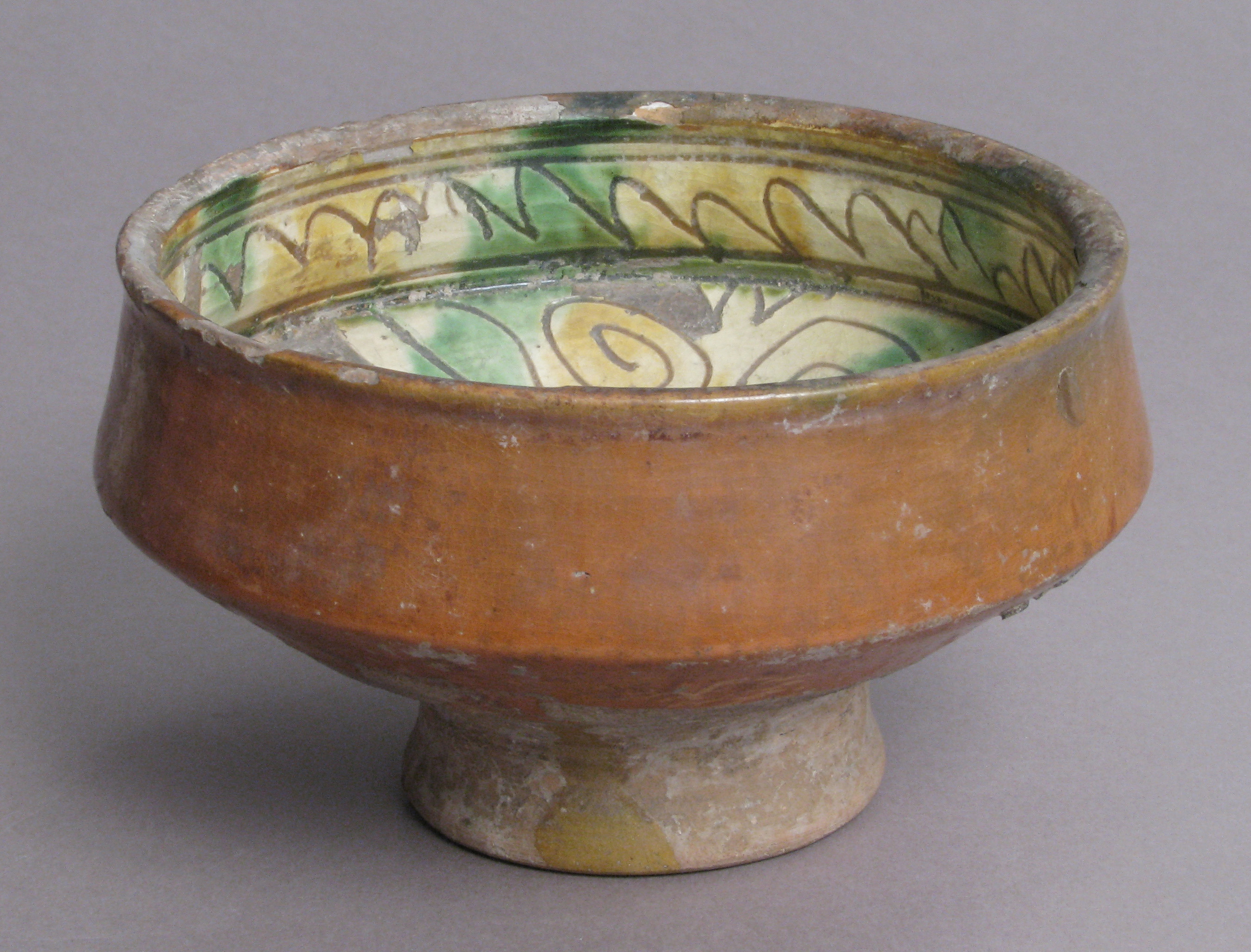
A ceramic clayen Byzantine bowl with an interior decoration

While Byzantine pottery found at excavations in Boeotia was decorated with innovative techniques and designs that combined elements from local culture and Islamic art, the shape and function of tablewares remained simple - jugs were uncommon, and the wide, shallow bowls and dishes were too porous to use as drinking vessels or for watery soups or stews.

The personal table fork is suspected to have been invented in the Byzantine Empire where they were commonly used by the 4th century.

By the 13th-century, the previous style of dishes was replaced by bowls that were deeper and narrower, suitable as vessels for liquids, stews or beverages. Stylized and geometric floral patterns became more common than the animal and human figures of earlier tableware and the quality of lead glaze was dramatically improved over the coarse and non-durable, soft tableware of previous centuries.

The extent to which changes in tableware were a result of changes in the style of foods consumed in Boetia is a matter of further study. Because written sources are lacking, scholars have taken into consideration the visual evidence depicted on pottery, medieval icons, and Ottoman miniatures, noting differences in the dining culture represented on 11th and 14th century Byzantine frescoes and miniatures. The fresco of the Last Supper at the crypt of Hosios Loukas shows a single large communal plate at the center of the table, with two communal cups, one on either side of the plate. Jesus and the twelve apostles presumably ate with their hands, as no forks or other utensils are shown.

Some scholars believe the dishes in the fresco may be symbolic rather than representations of historical dining habits. Fish are shown in the plate, but research on early Christian culture has not found evidence of a Fish Eucharist. A similar pattern of a large communal plate with two communal cups is depicted in 11th-century miniatures, one from a Byzantine manuscript (now in Paris) that shows The feast of Herod and Jesus sitting in the house of Simon the leper, and another showing several diners reaching into the communal plate with their hands. The Last Supper fresco at the Dochiariou monastery of Mount Athos from the 14th-century depicts food served in multiple bowls, with wine jugs, and beakers, individual bread rolls, and shared dishes and knives. There is archaeological evidence supporting the assertions that knives were used as culinary utensils in the 14th-century from excavations of medieval Panakton.

Based on studies of middle and lower class household goods, Nikolaos Oikonomides concluded that the average Byzantine household "often, if not always, ate with their fingers from a large serving plate and drank from a common cup or jar (made of clay).

== See also ==
- Anthimus (physician)

Modern:

- Greek cuisine
- Cypriot cuisine
- Arab cuisine
- Lebanese cuisine

General:

- Medieval cuisine

== Notes ==
Scholarly opinion on what the average Byzantine citizen ate is divided. Some, such as John L. Teall, Alexander Kazhdan, and Giles Constable, suggested that "the average Byzantine was undernourished, consuming only bread, vegetables, and wine, but rarely meat or fish". Joanita Vroom, on the other hand, suggested that a much wider range of foods were available to the average Byzantine. Grains, pulses, fresh fruits and vegetables, dairy products, fish and meat, wine, olive oil, and honey were all part of the typical Byzantine diet according to her.

== Sources ==
- Chrysopouis, Phillip (2002), "The Ancient Greek Roots of Feta, The Oldest Cheese in Recorded History", GreekReporter
- Setton, Kenneth (1958), "The Emperor John Vlll Slept Here...", Speculum, DIO 10.2307/2850780
- Vroom, Joanita (2018), Archeological and Urban Settlement in Late Roman and Byzantine Anatolia: Euchaita-Avkat-Beyozu and its Enviorment, Cambridge University Press, ISBN 978-1-108-47115-2
- Dalby, Andrew (2003), Flavours of Byzantium, Totnes, England: Prospect Books, ISBN 1-903018-14-5
- "Medieval Sourcebook: Liutprand of Cremona: Report of his Mission to Constantinople", www.fordham.edu
- Dogan, Murat (2025) "The effects and contributions of Byzantine cuisine to modern Istanbul cuisine", Discover Food, doi:10.1007/s44187-025-00486-4 ISSN 2731-4286
- Koukoules, Phaidon l. (1952), Βυζαντινών βίος και πολιτισμός, ISBN 9789600201413
- Skordaki-Kasimi, Vasiliki (2019),
- Baron, Henriette (2012), "Animals in the Byzantine Empire: An Overview of the Archaezoological Evidence", Archeologia Medievale.
