= Retsina =

Greek wine

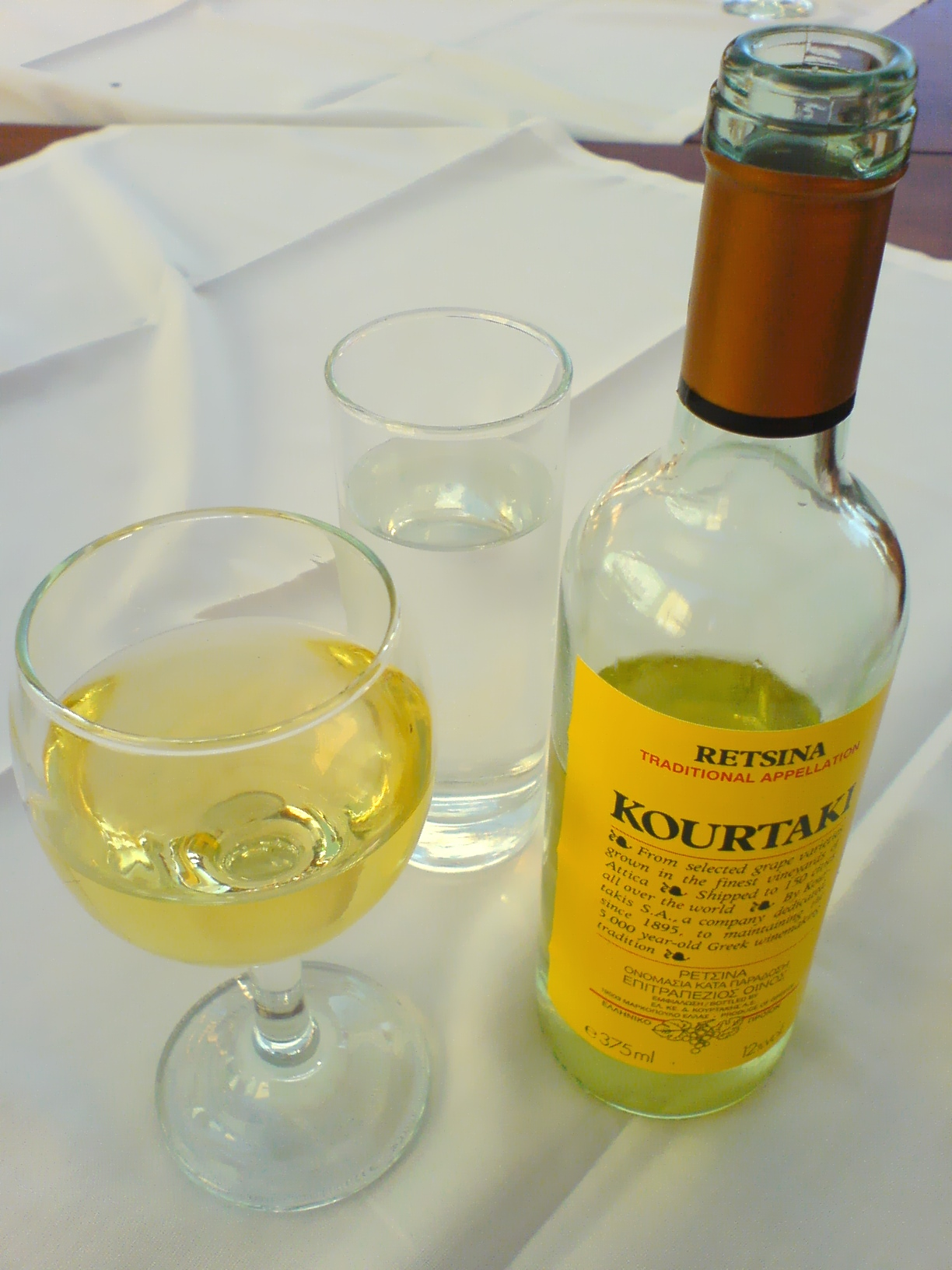
A bottle of retsina from the Greek producer Kourtaki

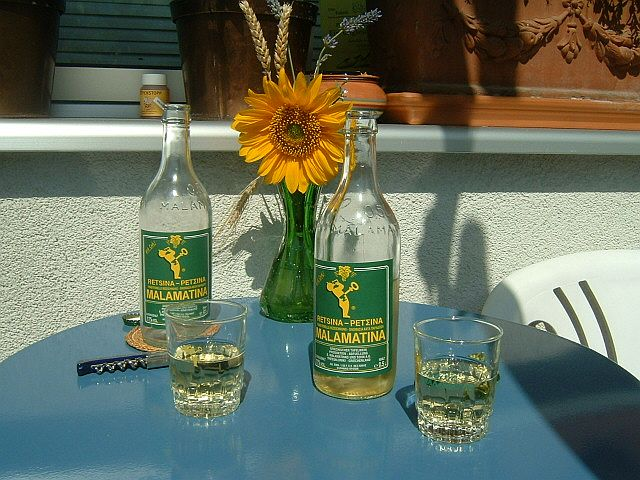
Retsina Malamatina

Retsina (Greek: ρετσίνα) is a Greek white (or rosé or very rarely red) resinated wine, which has been made for at least 2,000 years. Its unique flavor is said to have originated from the practice of sealing wine vessels, particularly amphorae, with Aleppo pine resin in ancient times. Before the invention of impermeable glass bottles, oxygen caused many wines to spoil within a year. Pine resin helped keep air out, while infusing the wine with resin aroma. The Romans began to use barrels in the 3rd century AD, removing any oenological necessity for resin, but the flavor itself was so popular that the style is still widespread.

== History ==
The earliest recorded mention of using resin with wine amphorae is by the first-century Roman writer Columella, who detailed in his work "De Re Rustica" (12,20,3 and 12,22,2) the different types of resin that could be used to seal a container or be mixed into the wine. He recommended, however, that the very best wines should not be mixed with resin because of the unpleasant flavor introduced thereby. His contemporary, Pliny the Elder, recommends the use of adding resin to the fermenting wine must in his work Naturalis Historia (14.124) with the resin from mountainous areas having a better aroma than those that come from lower lands (16.60).

The Roman settlements in Illyria, Cisalpine Gaul and Gallia Narbonensis did not use resin-coated amphorae due to the lack of suitable local pine trees and began to develop solid, less leak-prone wooden barrels in the 1st century AD. By the 3rd century, barrel making was prevalent throughout the Roman Empire. The exception was the eastern empire regions of Byzantium which had developed a taste for the strong, pungent wine and continued to produce resinated wine long after the Western Roman Empire stopped. The difference in taste between the two empires took center stage in the work of the historian Liutprand of Cremona and his Relatio de Legatione Constantinopolitana. In 968, Liutprand was sent to Constantinople to arrange a marriage between the daughter of the late Emperor Romanos II and the future Holy Roman Emperor Otto II. According to Liutprand, he was treated very rudely and in an undignified manner by the court of Nikephoros II, being served goat stuffed with onion and served in fish sauce and "undrinkable" wine mixed with resin, pitch and gypsum—very offensive to his Germanic tastes.

Pilgrims and Crusaders to the Holy Land during the Middle Ages recorded their experiences with the strong, resin wines of the Greek islands. Pietro Casola, an Italian noble who traveled to Jerusalem in 1494, wrote about the wines and cuisines of the places he stopped at along the way. In one of his entries, about his visit to Modone on Peloponnese, he wrote about the bounty of good quality wines made from Malmsey, Muscatel and Rumney varieties. Everything he tried was pleasing, except the strong, resinated wine with an unpleasant odour.

=== Anecdotal history ===
Popular anecdotes about the evolution of retsina stem from the Roman conquest of Greece. Stories claim that the Romans plundered the wines of Greece, angering the citizens, who turned to pine resin as a way of extending their store of wine and as a deterrent to their thirsty conquerors. The harsh flavor was said to put off the Romans, who refused to drink the bitter ferment. Another anecdote claims that an excess of undiluted retsina was lethal for King Eric I of Denmark and Sigurd I of Norway.

== Wine regions ==
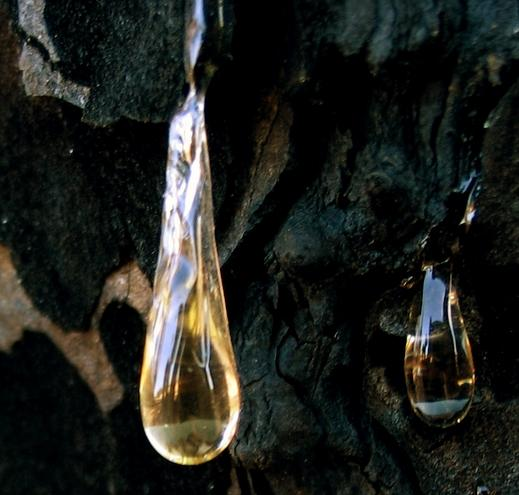
Pine resin

In Greece, local retsina is produced throughout the country. Major production centers around Attica, Boeotia and Euboea. The European Union treats the name "retsina" as a protected designation of origin and traditional appellation for Greece and parts of the southern regions of Cyprus. An Australian wine style made in South Australia can be called "resinated wine" but not "retsina".

== Grapes and winemaking ==
Today the traditional grape for retsina is Savatiano with Assyrtiko and Rhoditis sometimes blended in, as well as other grape varieties throughout Greece. On the island of Rhodes, Athiri is the main grape. Modern retsina is made following the same winemaking techniques of white wine or rosé, except for small pieces of Aleppo pine resin added to the must during fermentation. The pieces stay mixed with the must, and elute an oily resin film on the liquid surface; at racking the wine is clarified and the solids and surface film are removed from the finished wine. Nowadays, protecting the new wine from oxidation is easy to do with far simpler means and much less resin is used than traditionally called for. Such wines lack the pungent "whiff of turpentine" streak of old, and are considered ideal accompaniments to such strong-tasting local cuisine as pastırma or skordalia (garlic dip), which are often consumed as mezes with alcoholic beverages.

== See also ==
- Ancient Greece and wine
