= Istarska =

Istarska may refer to:

- Istarska županija, in Croatia
- Malvazija Istarska, in Croatia
