= Malamatina =

Greek wine brand

Malamatina (Greek: Μαλαματίνα) is the name of a Greek wine brand, mostly known for its retsina.

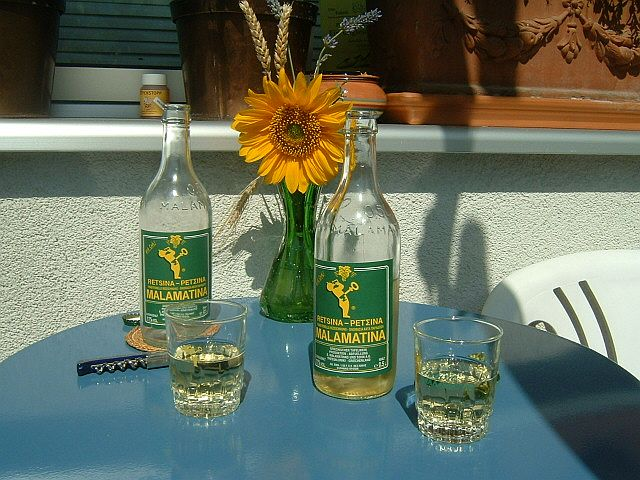
Bottles of retsina Malamatina

It was founded in Alexandroupoli in 1895 by Konstantinos Malamatinas, a native of the island of Tenedos. The company has facilities in Kalubia and Thessaloniki, where it has its base.
