= Resinated wine =

Wine with tree resin flavors

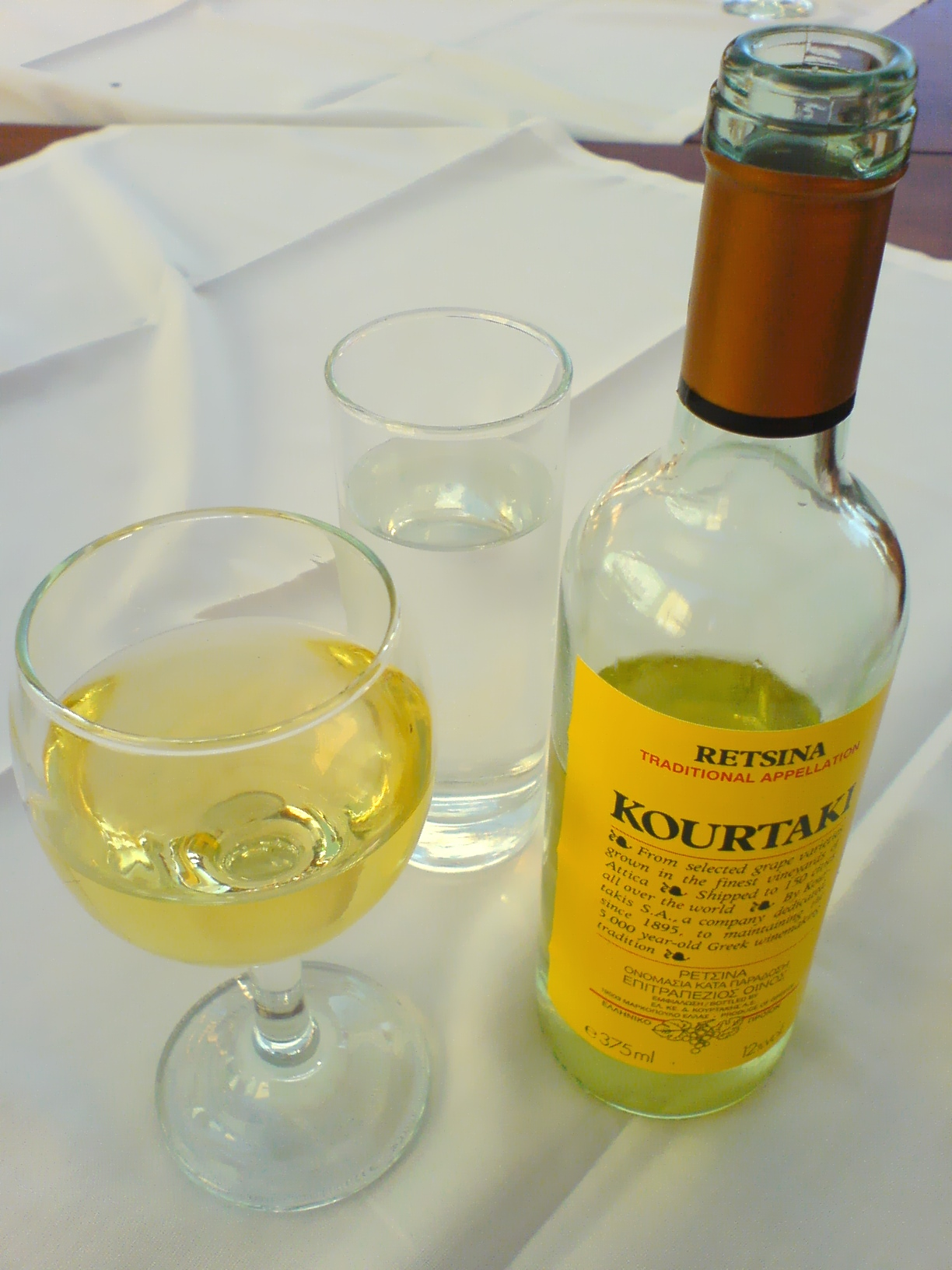
A bottle and glass of Retsina

Resinated wine is a type of wine that derives part of its flavor from exposure to tree resins, most generally pine resin, therefore often being known as pine wine. Prior to the widespread use of barrels in Europe, wine was stored in amphorae, often sealed with Aleppo pine resin. Wines thus sealed were flavored by the resin, and over time this became a feature of the wine itself rather than an unwanted side effect.

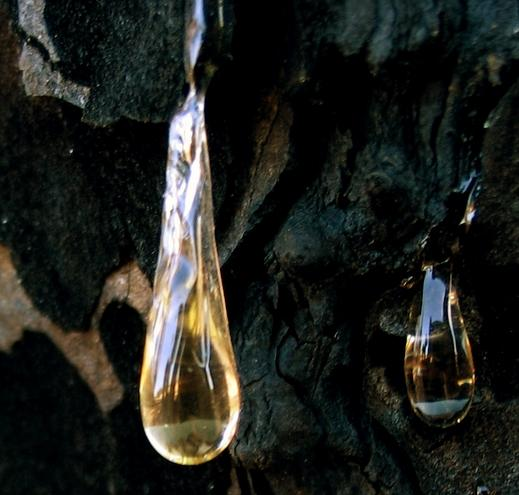
Pine resin

Though today mainly associated with Greece, resinated wine appears to have been widespread in the past. In his Natural History (book XIV), Pliny the Elder noted that in the modern-day Rhône wine region (near Vienne), the Allobroges produced a highly valued resinated wine.

The most common form of resinated wine today is Greek retsina (ρετσίνα), which for over 2000 years has been produced in and exported from Greece, particularly around Attica, Boeotia and Euboea. The European Union treats the name "retsina" as a protected designation of origin and a traditional appellation for Greece and parts of the southern regions of Cyprus. A South Australian wine style can be called "resinated wine" but not "retsina".
