= Ancient Greece and wine =

Wine in Ancient Greece

Greek influence in the 6th century BC

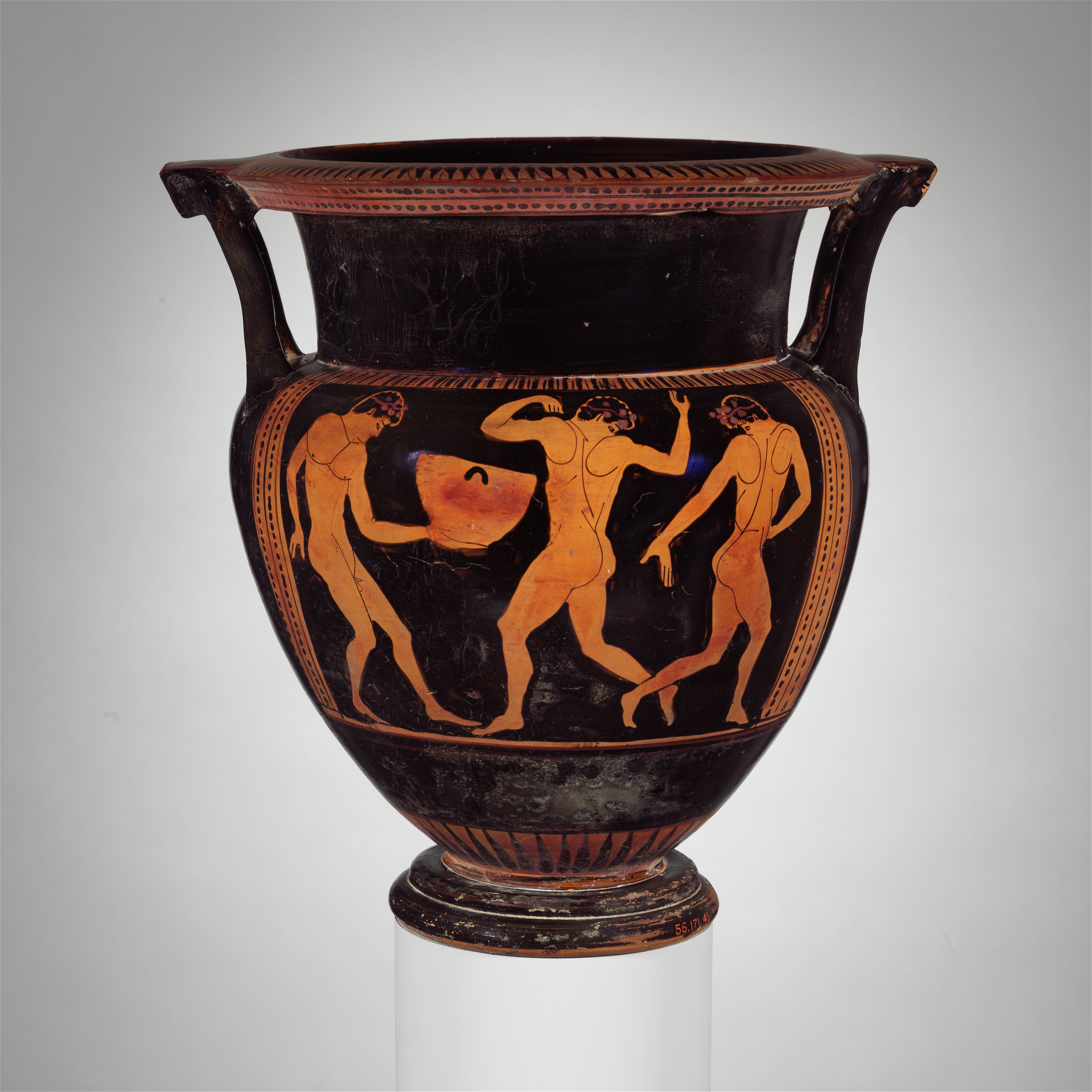
Greek terracotta column-krater with images of wine consumption, 5th century BC

The influence of wine in ancient Greece helped ancient Greece trade with neighboring countries and regions. Many mannerisms and cultural aspects were associated with wine. It led to great change in Ancient Greece as well.

The peoples of the Mediterranean began to emerge from barbarism when they learned to cultivate the olive and the vine.

The ancient Greeks pioneered new methods of viticulture and wine production that they shared with early winemaking communities in what are now France, Italy, Austria and Russia, as well as others, through trade and colonization. Along the way, they markedly influenced the ancient European winemaking cultures of the Celts, Etruscans, Scythians and ultimately the Romans.

== Origins ==
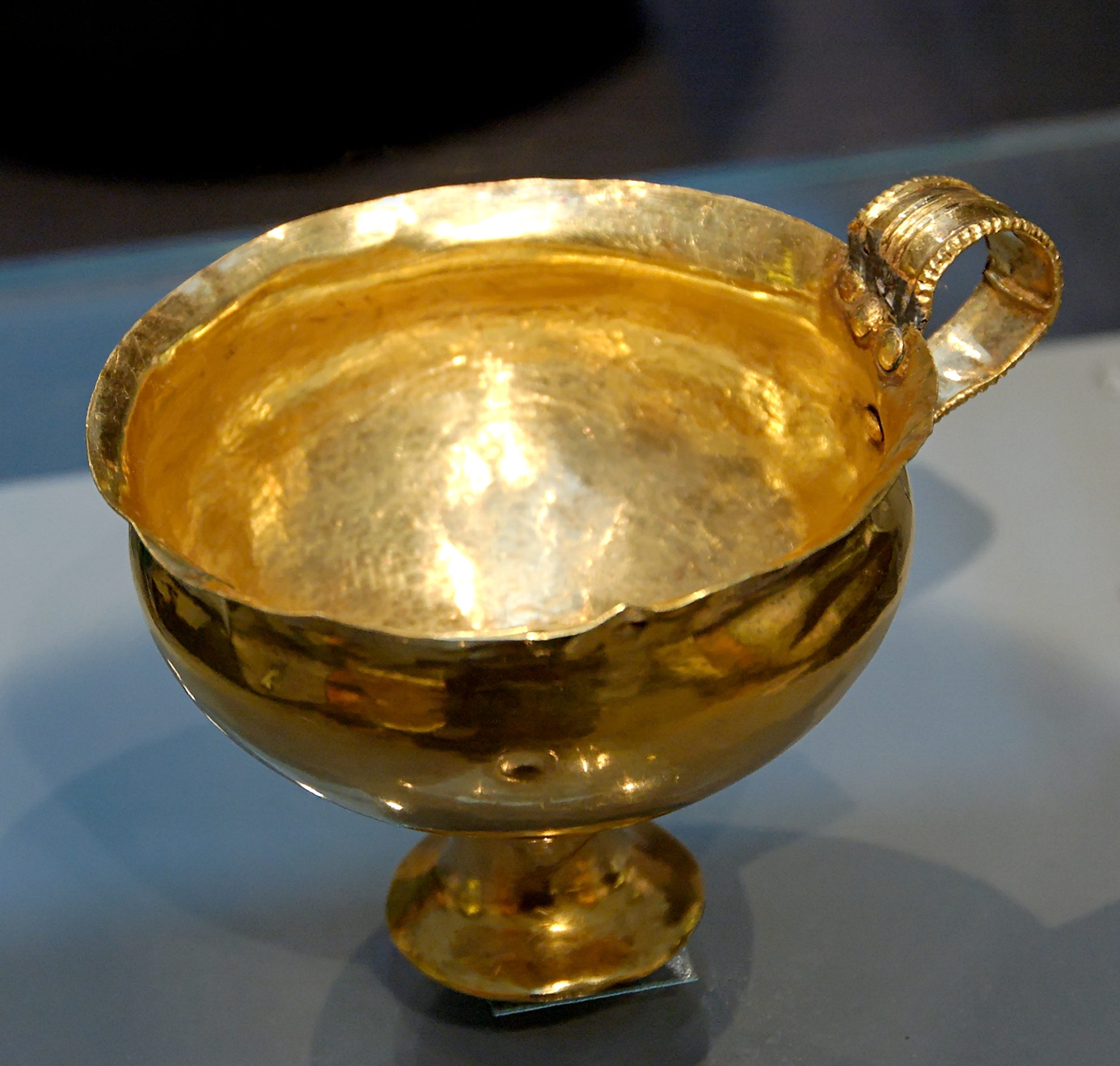
A golden goblet from the Mycenaean period.

Viticulture has existed in Greece since the late Neolithic period, with domestic cultivation becoming widespread by the early Bronze Age. Through trade with ancient Egypt, the Minoan civilization on Crete was introduced to Egyptian winemaking methods, an influence most likely imparted to Mycenaean Greece. The Minoan palaces had their associated vineyards, as Spyridon Marinatos demonstrated in excavations just south of the palace site at Archanes, and the Minoan equivalent of a villa rustica devoted to wine production was unearthed at Kato Zakros in 1961.

In Minoan culture of the mid-second millennium BC, wine and the sacred bull were linked in the form of the horn-shaped drinking cups called rhyta; the name of Oinops (Greek: οἶνοψ, "wine-colored") is twice attested in Linear B tablets at Knossos and repeated twice in Homer. Along with olives and grain, grapes were an important agricultural crop vital to sustenance and community development; the ancient Greek calendar followed the course of the vintner's year.

One of the earliest known wine presses was discovered in Palekastro in Crete, from which island the Mycenaeans are believed to have spread viticulture to others in the Aegean Sea and quite possibly to mainland Greece.

In the Mycenaean period, wine took on greater cultural, religious and economic importance. Records inscribed on tablets in Linear B include details of wine, vineyards and wine merchants, as well as an early allusion to Dionysus, the Greek god of wine. Greeks embedded the arrival of winemaking culture in the mythologies of Dionysus and the cultural hero Aristaeus.

Early remnants of amphoras show that the Mycenaeans actively traded wine throughout the ancient world in places such as Cyprus, Egypt, Palestine, Sicily and southern Italy.

== Colonization and trade ==
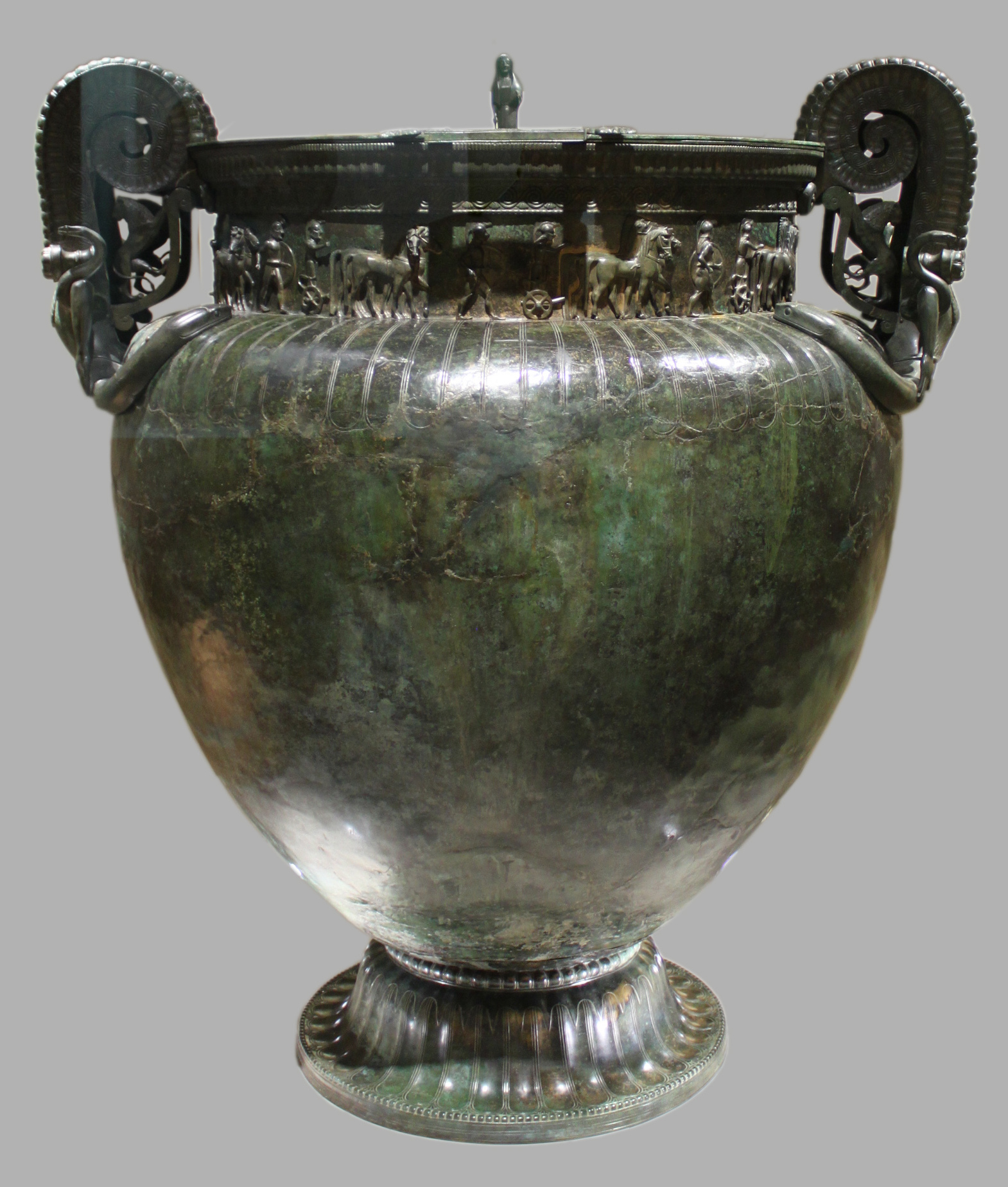
The Vix Krater

As the Greek city-states established colonies throughout the Mediterranean, the settlers brought grapevines with them and were active in cultivating the wild vines they encountered. Sicily and southern Italy formed some of the earliest colonies, as they were areas already home to an abundance of grapevines. The Greeks called the southern part of the Italian Peninsula Oenotria ("land of vines"). Settlements in Massalia in southern France and along the shores of the Black Sea soon followed, with the expectation that not only would colonial wine production supply domestic needs, but also create trading opportunities to meet the demand of the nearby city-states.

Athens itself provided a large and lucrative market for wine, with significant vineyard estates forming in the Attican region and on the island of Thasos to help satisfy demand. Wine historians have theorized that the Greeks may have introduced viticulture to Spain and Portugal, but competing theories suggest that the Phoenicians probably reached those areas first.

The grape clusters, vines and wine cups that adorn Greek coins from classical times bear witness to the importance of wine to the ancient Greek economy. With every major trading partner, from the Crimea, Egypt, Scythia, Etruria and beyond, the Greeks traded their knowledge of viticulture and winemaking, as well the fruits of their own production. Millions of amphora pieces bearing the unique seals of various city-states and Aegean islands have been uncovered by archaeologists, demonstrating the scope of Greek influence.

A shipwreck discovered off the coast of southern France included nearly 10,000 amphoras containing nearly 300,000 litres (79,000 US gal) of Greek wine, presumably destined for trade up the Rhône and Saône rivers into Gaul. It is estimated that the Greeks shipped nearly 10 million liters of wine into Gaul each year through Massalia. In 1929, the discovery of the Vix Grave in Burgundy included several artifacts demonstrating the strong ties between Greek wine traders and local Celtic villagers. The most notable of these was a large Greek-made krater, designed to hold over 1,000 litres (260 US gal) of wine.

== Viticulture and winemaking influences ==
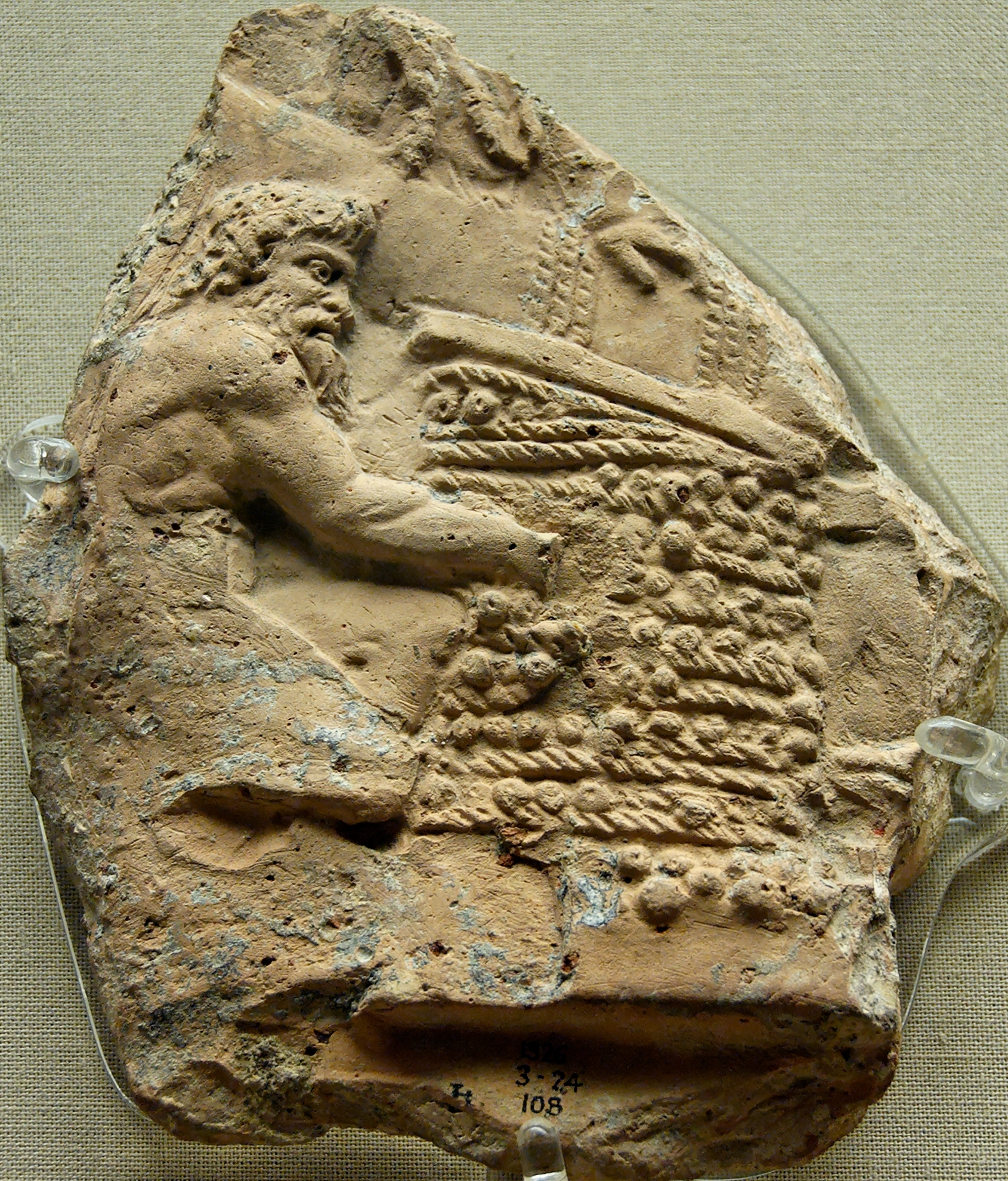
A terra cotta relief showing Satyrs expressing the juice from trodden grapes in wicker mats in the tropeion.

Ancient Greeks called the cultivated vine hemeris (Greek: ἡμερίς), after their adjective for "tame" (Greek: ἥμερος), differentiating it from its wild form. A massive rootstock was carved into a cult image of the Great Goddess and set up on the coast of Phrygia by the Argonauts. The late Dionysiaca of Nonnus recounts the primitive invention of wine-pressing, credited to Dionysus, and Homer's description of the Shield of Achilles describes that part of its wrought decoration illustrating the grape harvest from a vineyard protectively surrounded by a trench and a fence; the vines stand in rows supported on stakes. He also wrote that Laertes, father of Odysseus, had over 50 grape varieties planted in different parts of his vineyard.

The 4th-century BC Greek writer Theophrastus left a detailed record of some Greek influences and innovations in viticulture, one of which was the study of vineyard soils and their proper match to specific grapevines. Another innovation was the minimization of yields for more intense concentration of flavors and quality, rather than increased quantity. The economics of the time favored high yields for most crops, and intentionally limiting agricultural output was exceedingly uncommon in the ancient world. Theophrastus also detailed the practice of using suckering and plant cuttings for new vineyard plantings. The Greeks also employed vine training with stacked plants for easier cultivation and harvesting, rather than let the grapevines grow untrained in bushes or up trees.

While ampelographers have been unable to identify the exact ancestry of any current Vitis vinifera grape variety among those grown by the ancient Greeks, several—e.g. Aglianico (also known as Helleniko), Grechetto, and Trebbiano (also known as Greco)—have distinct Greek heritage. Not all Greek viticulture techniques were widely adopted by other wine regions. Some Greek vineyards used mysticism to ward off disease and bad weather. For example, two vineyard workers would tear a live white rooster in two, each then carrying one half around the perimeter of the vineyard in an opposite direction from the other. Where they met again, the carcass would be buried next to the vineyard.

The Greeks practiced an early form of pigeage when grapes were ready for crushing. Wicker baskets filled with grapes were placed inside wooden or earthenware vats with a rope or plank above. Vineyard workers grasped the rope for balance to crush the grapes with their feet, occasionally to the accompaniment of a flute played in a festive manner. After crushing, the grapes were placed in large pithoi, jars where fermentation took place.

Both Hesiod's writings and Homer's Odyssey include some of the earliest mentions of straw wine production: laying out freshly harvested grapes on mats to dry nearly to raisins before pressing. A wine made on Lesbos known as protropon was among the first known to be made exclusively from "free-run juice," drawn from grape clusters expressing their contents under their own weight. Other Greek innovations include the harvest of deliberately unripe grapes in producing a more acidic wine for blending. The boiling of grape must was discovered as another means of adding sweetness to the wine. The Greeks believed wine could also be improved by adding resin, herbs, spice, seawater, brine, oil and perfume. Retsina, mulled wine and vermouth are some modern examples of these practices.

As late as the Second Council of Constantinople in 691 AD, exactly three centuries after Theodosius closed the temples, a canon was issued expressly forbidding the cries of "Dionysus!" from the wine treaders, who still were masked; it was recommended that "Kyrie eleison" be substituted.

== Greek wine ==
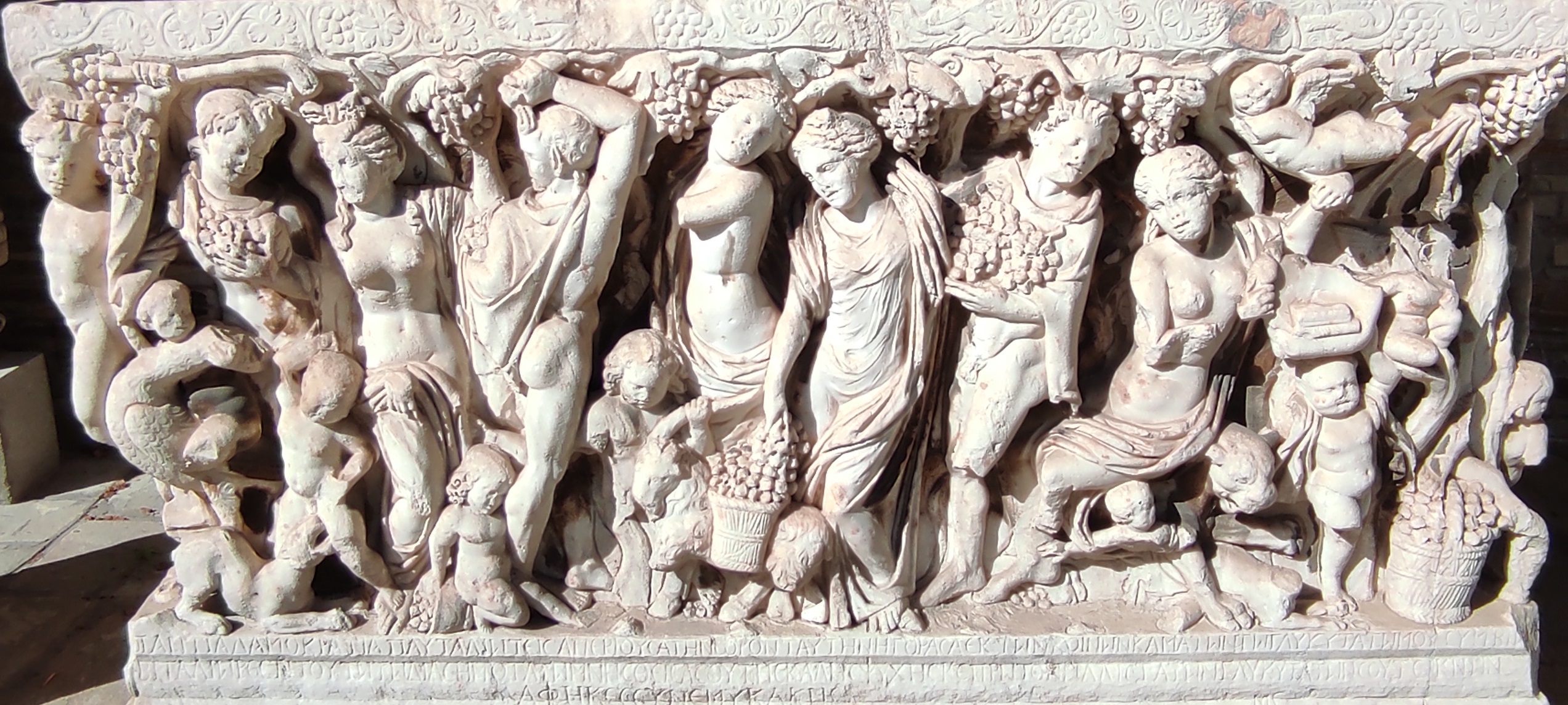
A 3rd-century Roman sarcophagus with many satyrs and maenads participating in the wine grape harvest, Archaeological Museum of Thessaloniki, Greece.

The reputation of a wine depends on the region the wine came from rather than an individual producer or vineyard. In the 4th century BC, the most expensive wine sold in the local agora in Athens was that from Chios, which sold for between a quarter of a drachma and 2 drachma for a chous worth—about 3 liters, or the equivalent of four standard 750 ml wine bottles today.

Like early wine critics, Greek poets would extol the virtues of certain wines and review less favorably those not up to their standards. The wines most frequently cited as being of good quality were those of Chalkidike, Ismaros, Chios, Kos, Lesbos, Mende, Naxos, Peparethos (present-day Skopelos) and Thasos. Among individual wines lauded were two with unknown origins: Bibline and Pramnian. Bibline is believed to have been made in a style similar to the Phoenician wine from Byblos, highly regarded for its perfumed fragrance by Greek writers like Archestratus. The Greek version of the wine is thought to have originated in Thrace from a grape variety known as Bibline. Pramnian wine was found in several regions, most notably Lesbos but also Icaria and Smyrna (in present-day Turkey). It was suggested by Athenaeus that Pramnian was a generic name referring to a dark wine of good quality and aging potential.

The earliest reference to a named wine is from the lyrical poet Alkman (7th century BC), who praises "Dénthis," a wine from the western foothills of Mount Taygetus in Messenia, as "anthosmías" ("smelling of flowers"). According to wine expert Jancis Robinson, Limnio was almost certainly the Lemnia grape described by Aristotle as a speciality of the island of Limnos, which was probably the same as the modern-day Lemnió varietal, a red wine with a bouquet of oregano and thyme. If so, this makes Lemnió the oldest known varietal still in cultivation.

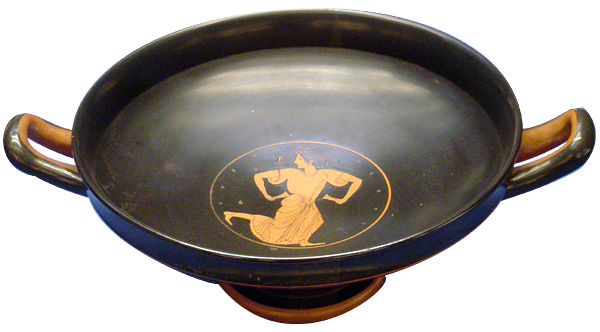
A kylix drinking cup was used to serve Greek wine.

The most common style of wine in ancient Greece was sweet and aromatic, though drier wines were also produced. Color ranged from dark, inky black to tawny to nearly clear. Oxidation was difficult to control, a common wine fault that meant many wines did not retain their quality beyond the next vintage. However, wines that were stored well and aged were highly prized: Hermippus described the best mature wines as having a bouquet of "violets, roses and hyacinth." Comedic poets noted that Greek women liked "old wine but young men."

Wine was almost always diluted, usually with water (or snow when the wine was to be served cold). The Greeks believed that only barbarians drank unmixed or undiluted wine and that the Spartan king Cleomenes I was once driven insane after drinking wine this way. They also believed that undiluted wine could even kill the drinker: the Gallic chieftain Brennus was recorded as having committed suicide by drinking wine full-strength. Greeks asserted that the dilution of wine with water was a mark of civilized behavior, whose contrast was embodied in the myth of the battle of Lapiths with the Centaurs, inflamed to rape and mayhem because of wine drunk undiluted with water.

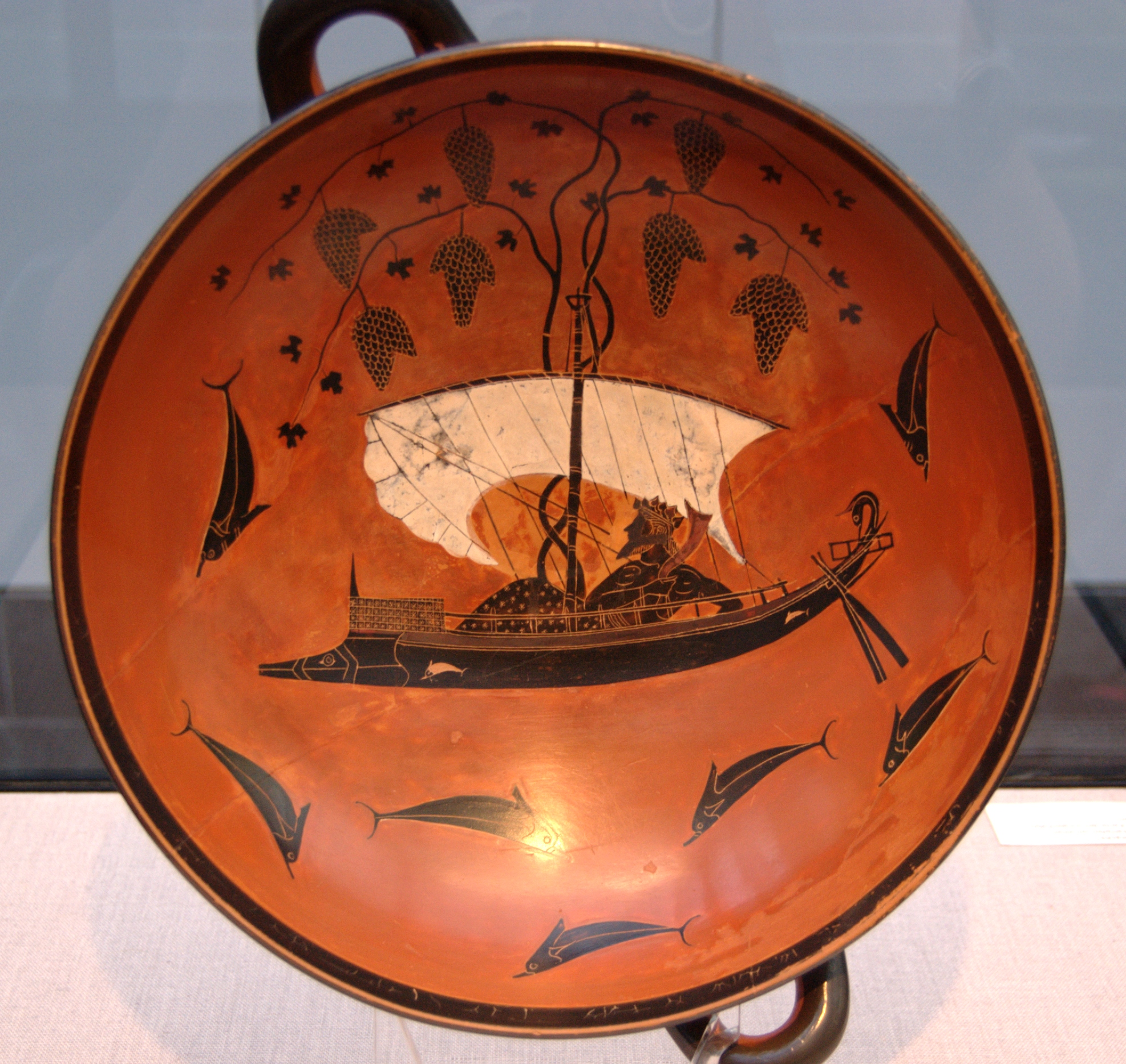
Wine in Greece was never far from its mystical connection to the cult of Dionysus: Attic black-figure kylix, ca 530 BC, depicting Dionysus aboard the vine-entangled ship among his would-be abductors transformed to dolphins.

== Wine in Greek culture ==
In addition to its significance as a trade commodity, wine also served important religious, social and medical purposes in Greek society. The "feast of the wine" (me-tu-wo ne-wo) was a festival in Mycenaean Greece celebrating the "month of the new wine." The cult of Dionysus was very active, if not mysterious, and was immortalized in Euripides's play The Bacchae. Several festivals were held throughout the year in honor of the God of wine. February's Anthesteria marked the opening of the wine jars from the previous autumn harvest, featuring wine-drinking contests and a procession through Athens carrying wine jars. The Dionysia included theatrical performances of both comedies and tragedies in honor of the God of wine. Wine was a frequent component at the symposium, which sometimes included the game of kottabos, which involved flinging lees from a wine cup towards a target.

The medicinal use of wine was frequently studied by the Greeks, including Hippocrates, who did extensive research on the topic. He used wine as a cure for fevers, to ease convalescence and as an antiseptic. He also studied the effect of wine on his patients' stool. Various types of wine were prescribed by Greek doctors for use as an analgesic, diuretic, tonic and digestive aid. The Greeks were also aware of some negative health effects, especially those arising from the consumption of wine beyond moderation. Athenaeus made frequent mention of wine's ability to induce hangover and suggested various remedies for it. The poet Eubulus noted that three bowls (kylikes) were the ideal amount of wine to consume. The quantity of three bowls to represent moderation is a recurring theme throughout Greek writing (today, the standard 750 ml bottle contains roughly three to six glasses of wine, depending on serving size). In his c. 375 BC play Semele or Dionysus, Eubulus has Dionysus say:

Three bowls do I mix for the temperate: one to health, which they empty first; the second to love and pleasure; the third to sleep. When this bowl is drunk up, wise guests go home. The fourth bowl is ours no longer, but belongs to violence; the fifth to uproar; the sixth to drunken revel; the seventh to black eyes; the eighth is the policeman's; the ninth belongs to biliousness; and the tenth to madness and the hurling of furniture.

== See also ==
- Ancient Greek cuisine
- Ancient Rome and wine
- Greek wine
- Phoenicians and wine
- Wine-dark sea (Homer)
