= Greek Wine Cellars =

Greek wine producer

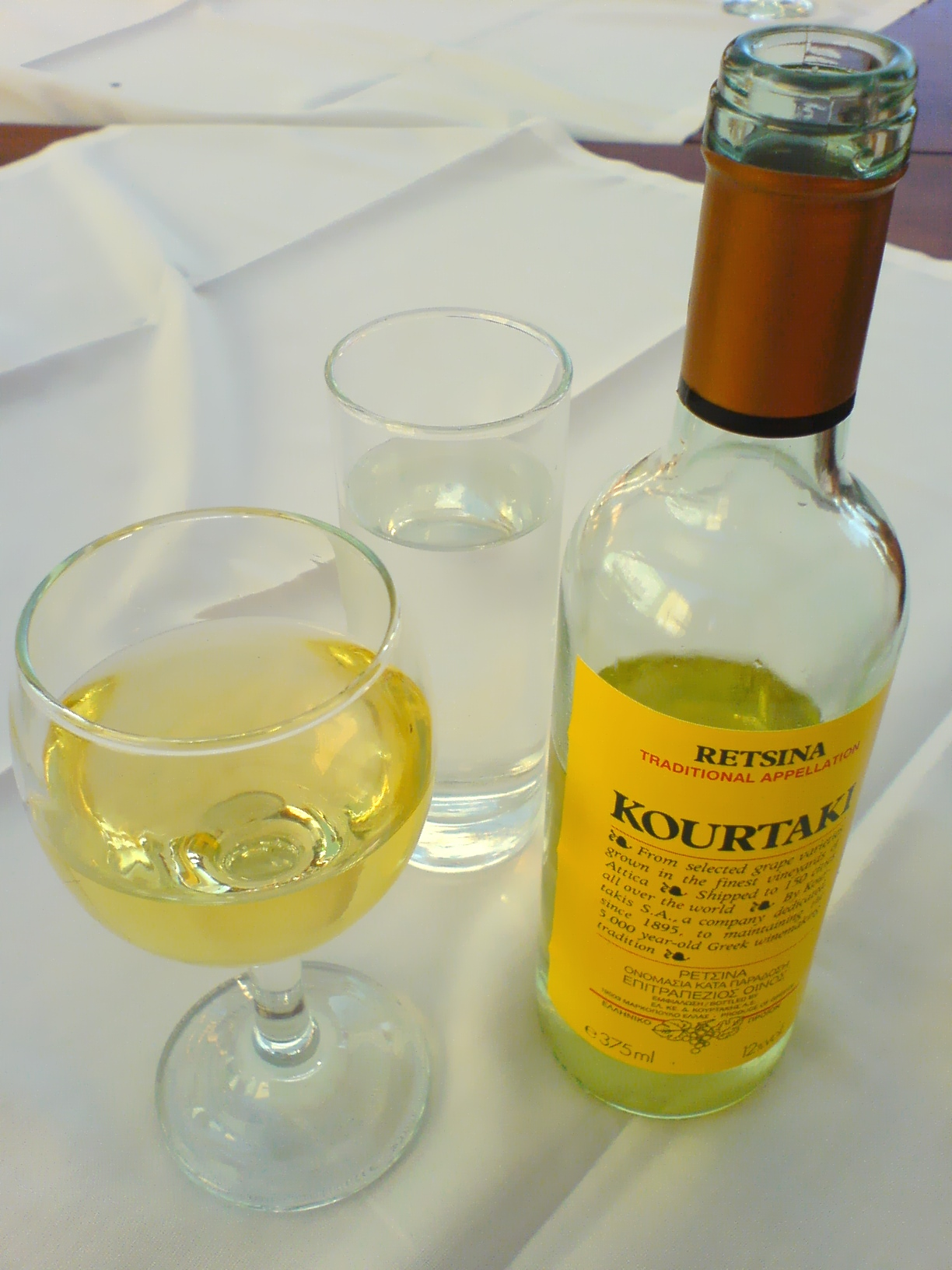
A 750-mL bottle of Kourtaki retsina.

Greek Wine Cellars, formerly known as Kourtaki Wines, is a large Greek wine producer. Its brands include Kourtaki, Apelia, Calliga, and Kouros. As of 2005, it sold 3.2 million cases of wine per year, about half in Greece and half abroad.

The company was founded in 1895 by Vassilis Kourtakis, one of the first Greeks to formally study oenology. For the first part of its history it focused on retsina shipped in bulk to tavernas around the country. At Vassilis's retirement, the company was taken over by his son, Dimitris Kourtakis, who had studied oenology in Dijon, France. Dimitris introduced a line of bottled Kourtaki retsina, initially in 500-mL bottle-cap-topped bottles, and later also in 750-mL cork-topped bottles. This became very popular during the 1960s and 1970s; at its peak it was selling 60 million bottles per year, and propelled the company to market dominance.

Dimitri's son, Vassilis Kourtakis, took over on his father's retirement, and began diversifying the company into styles other than retsina, partly as a result of the downturn in retsina's popularity. As part of this process, he introduced a number of new brands alongside the Kourtaki brand. Apelia was introduced as a line of low-cost table wines, while Kouros was introduced as a high-end brand (it became the first Greek wine featured on a non-Greek airline's wine list when Lufthansa added it). The company also purchased several other wine producers during this period, including Calliga of Kefalonia. To emphasize that the company had a wider set of offerings than the Kourtaki brand, Vassilis changed its name in the early 1990s from Kourtaki Wines to Greek Wine Cellars.
