= Francesco Suriano =

Italian Franciscan friar

Francesco Suriano (1445 – after 1481) was an Italian friar of the Franciscan order, who wrote a guide for travel to the Holy Land.

== Biography ==
Francesco Suriano was born in 1445 to a noble family of Venice. He may have first travelled to Alexandria, Egypt in 1462, as a young man. At age 25, he entered the monastery of San Francesco della Vigna in Venice. His skills at travel may have played a role to his assignment as a guardian in the convent of Beirut, Lebanon in 1480–1481.

At sometime in 1485, with the help from a nun, Sister Catherine Guarnieri da Osimo acting as a scribe in the Monastery of St Clares in Foligno, Francesco wrote his treatise, Il trattato di Terra Santa e dell'Oriente, published in 1900 by Girolamo Golubovich.

Suriano's treatise is tendentious, imbued with a great deal of religiosity, and justifications of the superiority of Catholicism to all other religions. It is also stained by bigotry, aimed at Orthodox Christians, who he viewed as heretical, and Muslims and Jews, who he viewed as despicable. In chapter 1 of the second part, he claims Muhammad was descended of Ishmaelites. For example, he enumerates all the different sects that share the custody of the Church of the Holy Sepulcher.

But in Chapter 38, he evinces his deep antisemitism. He claims that among all sects and religions, Jews are maligned and mistreated by all, as is the “just judgement of God’’. Even in Jerusalem, where he claims they committed the sin for which God had dispersed them throughout the world, they suffer and are afflicted. They are splintered into feuding groups. He claims that Muslims hold them in lower regard than Christians, and treat them like dogs, and dare not even touch them. In addition, it claims they often convert to Islam or Orthodoxy in order to gain in disputes with other Jews.

He speaks regarding the location of the cave used by Adam and Eve after being expelled from the Garden, the place where Abraham circumscribed Isaac, the church where the Virgen was buried, where Zacharias and Absalom are buried, the house of Caiphas and Anne, the tomb of the site of the last supper, and the houses and burial plots of many biblical figures as if they still stood and were clearly identified. He claims some of the orders are sustained by the patronage of European royalty. He also mentions a trip to Saint Catherine's Monastery in Sinai.

The text is often interrupted with prayers, and he discusses miracles and indulgences. He also speaks of spices of indo-Asia and of Portuguese towns in India.

He also quotes an epistle sent to Prester John (Prete Ianne), by the guardian of Mount Syon, Paulo de Chanedo. The letter addresses the king in Ethiopia, and sends in 1480 priests and teachers to instruct him in the true faith, and extirpate heresies, including Franciscan priest. He claims the Sultan was fearful of allowing such priest to travel south, because they might cause him to be encircled by Christians. He gives first hand notes of a trip south of Cairo through the Nile for 30 days till arriving to Nachada (likely Naqada), from there went west to a town of Acherman, using camels traveled in four days to Chosairo (likely El Qoseir) on the Indian Ocean. There they sailed for Sevachim, an Arabian port. From there they went to Achanon, then Alech and Dassi, from where they rode camels to the Moorish town of Menna. From there a trek of fifteen days, they entered Ethiopia and were sent from one prominent man to another, from the town of Maria to Fendun, then Reeldete, then Vaansol. They traveled on mule for nearly two weeks to the Church of the King, and saw an ornate Italianate organ. From there to Chiafeg and Barar (likely Barara or Bararach), the site of the court. In the court they encountered a number of Italians, who had ventured there in search of jewels and riches, but now found themselves not permitted to leave by the king.

He describes Ethiopia as brutish and without invention, almost entirely lacking solid architecture. He describes the soldiers as being branded with the royal symbol. They go shirtless and shoeless. He describes them as pusillanimous in habitus, weak, but zealous in faith and spirit.

He speaks of ostriches and Giraffes. The former, he claims, eats iron. The latter. Giraphe, he describes as one cubit taller front than back; front legs are longer than hind legs, speckled like leopards...the neck longer than the hind legs, and it is a superb animal and boastful, beautiful to see, the small head, with lively eyes, that brings incredible joy to their caretakers.

He travels to the Holy Land a few decades earlier than the account of Pietro Casola.
