= Pietro Casola =

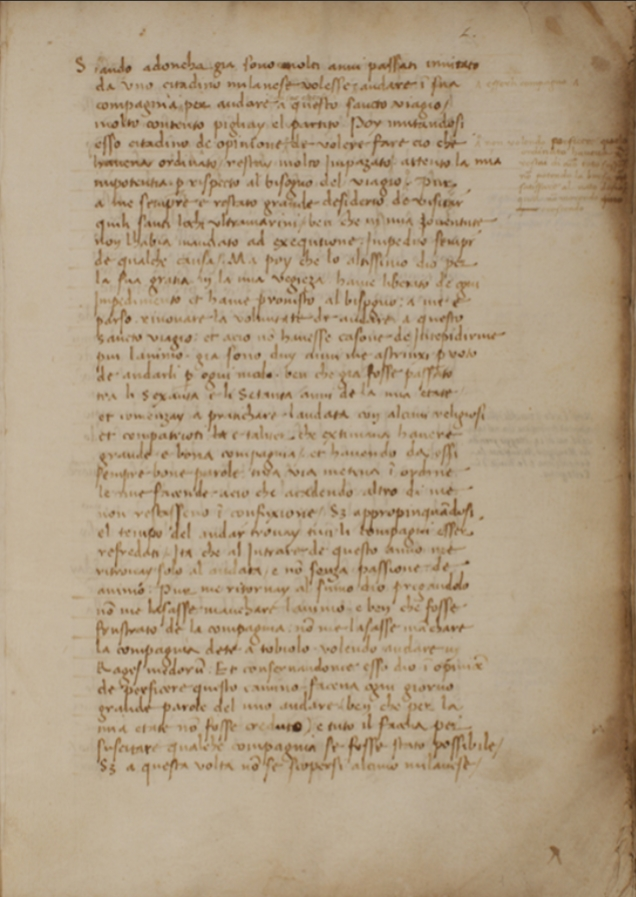

Pietro Casola (1427 – November 6, 1507) was a Catholic canon, born to a noble Italian family in Milan. He is most notable for the journal of his Pilgrimage to Jerusalem in the Year 1494. He served in Rome as a secretary attache to the Milanese Embassy in Rome and later as senior of the Cardinal Deacons of the Duomo. In 1467, Pope Paul II nominated him for the benefice of St. Victor at Corbetta as a reward for his service to the Catholic Church.

On May 15, 1494, Casola started his journey to the Holy Land of Jerusalem. His journal included detailed notes of the places that he visited along the way including their economic industries, food and culture as well as the status of their churches. He traveled to Ragusa, Corfu, Zante, Modone, Corone, Cerigo, Cerigotto, Paros, Candia, Rhodes. Limassol, Famagusta, Episcopia, Jaffa, Nabule (Nablus), Rama (Ramallah), Lydda (Lod), and finally Jerusalem, Bethlehem, and Jericho. Another such guide is that of Francesco Suriano from a few decades earlier.

== Bibliography ==
- Rossi Minutelli, Stefania (1978). "CASOLA, Pietro". Dizionario Biografico degli Italiani, Volume 21: Caruso–Castelnuovo (in Italian). Rome: Istituto dell'Enciclopedia Italiana. ISBN 978-8-81200032-6.
