= Dafnes =

Dafnes Δαφνές
- Community
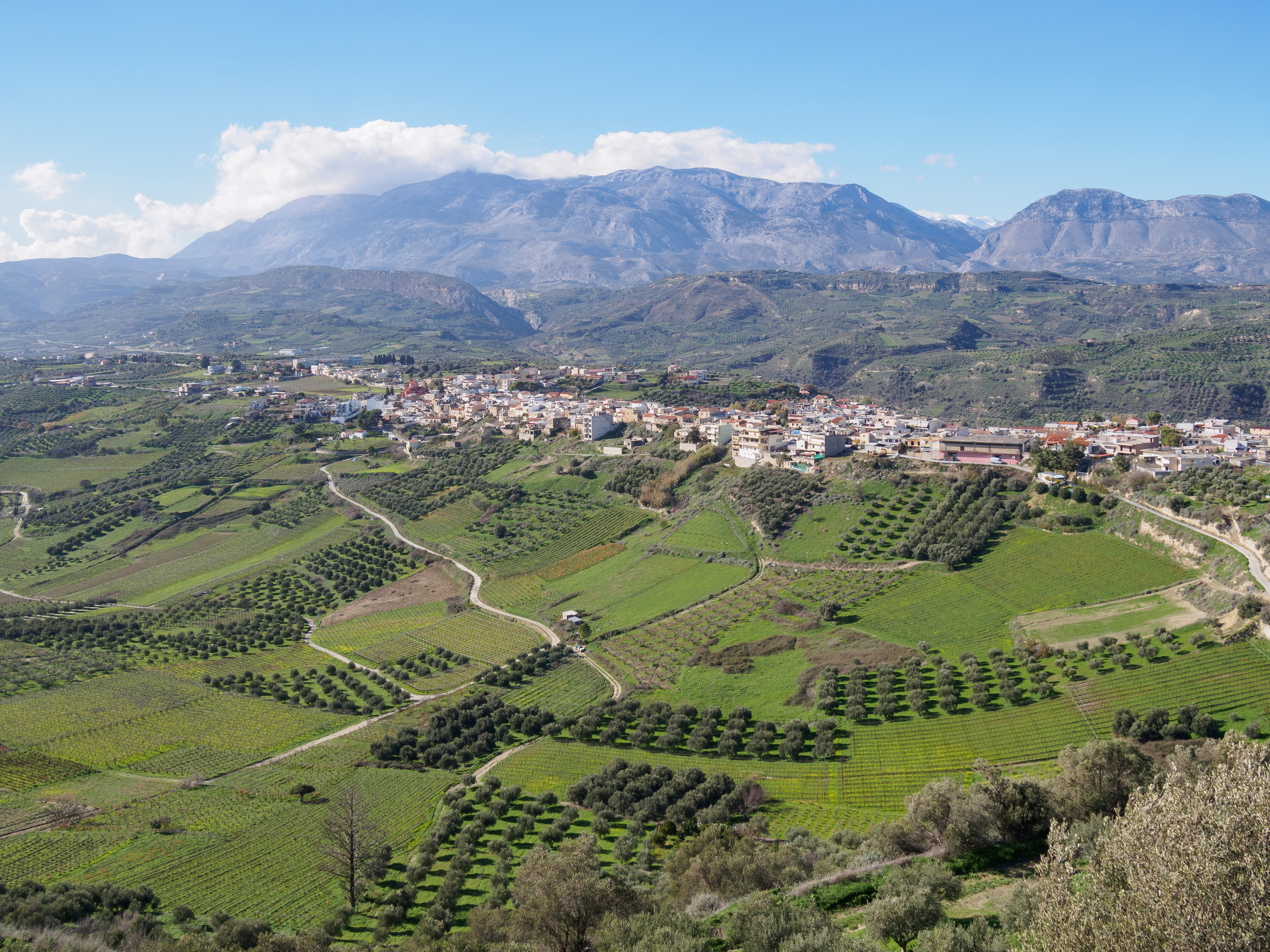
- View from northeast

- Location within Greece
- Coordinates: 35°12′58″N 25°03′01″E
- Country: Greece
- Administrative region: Crete
- Regional unit: Heraklion
- Municipality: Heraklion
- Municipal unit: Heraklion
- Elevation: 320 m (1,050 ft)

Population (2021)
  - Community: 1,133
- Time zone: UTC+2 (EET)
  - Summer (DST): UTC+3 (EEST)
- Postal code: 70011
- Area code: +30-2810

Dafnes (Greek: Δαφνές) is a Southwestern suburb and community in the Heraklion regional unit on the island of Crete, Greece.

It is situated 18 km Southwest of Heraklion at an altitude of 320 meters on a ridge in the eastern foothills of the 2456 m Mt. Psiloritis (Mt. Ida) immediately east of Greek National Road 97. Its population is about 1200.

Dafnes is an agricultural centre producing sultanas, grapes, wine, spirits, vegetables and olive oil. Since the 13th century it is known for its rich, sweet red "Dafnes" wines made from the Liatiko grape variety.

The central plaza is shaded by large eucalyptus trees and ringed by cafés and kafenia. The plaza is the main location of the widely known Dafnes Wine Festival, normally celebrated during the first ten days of July. Immediately north of the plaza stands the small church Agia Zoni Agios Nikolaos, built in 1685.

== Literature ==
- Heraklion and its Prefecture, Heraklion Prefecture’s Edition (Το Ηράκλειο και ο Νομός του. Έκδοση Νομαρχίας Ηρακλείου).
