= Magna Dea =

Magna Dea is Latin for "Great Goddess" and can refer to any major goddess worshipped during the Roman Republic or Roman Empire. Magna Dea could be applied to a goddess at the head of a pantheon, such as Juno or Minerva, or a goddess worshipped monotheistically. The term was used in hymns to various goddesses including Cybele. The term "Great Goddess" itself can refer to a mother goddess in contemporary Neopagan and Wiccan religions.
