= Rumney wine =

Greek wine in popular England and Europe during the 14th to 16th centuries

Rumney wine was a popular form of Greek wine in England and Europe during the 14th to 16th centuries. Its name was derived from its exporter Romania, which was at that time a common name for Greece and the southern Balkans as the lands of the Eastern Roman Empire. The wine was called Rumney or Romney in English, Romenier or Rumenier in German, vino di Romania in Italian.

Rumney was exported from Methoni in the southern Peloponnese (one English source calls it Rompney of Modonn) and perhaps also from Patras and other ports. Although modern methods are different, the Mavrodafni of Patras might be regarded as a modern equivalent of medieval Rumney wine. At the same period, Monemvasia, on the eastern coast of the Peloponnese, was the centre for the export of Malmsey wine; Cretan wine was the third of the medieval trio of Greek wines that were prized in western Europe.

Writers on food and diet list it among sweet and "hot" wines (hot in the dietary sense) of which no more than one or two glasses should be taken. It was not a "fortified" wine in the modern sense, rather a "cooked" wine (vin cuit) to which boiled-down must (grape syrup) was added.
