= Cretan wine =

Wine from the Greek island of Crete

Cretan wine is wine from the Greek island of Crete. It has a long history since wine was certainly being made by the Minoans since the Bronze Age. Wines from Crete are not listed among those specially prized in classical Greece, but under the Roman Empire in the 2nd century AD Crete was known for a sweet wine, protropos, which was exported to Italy.

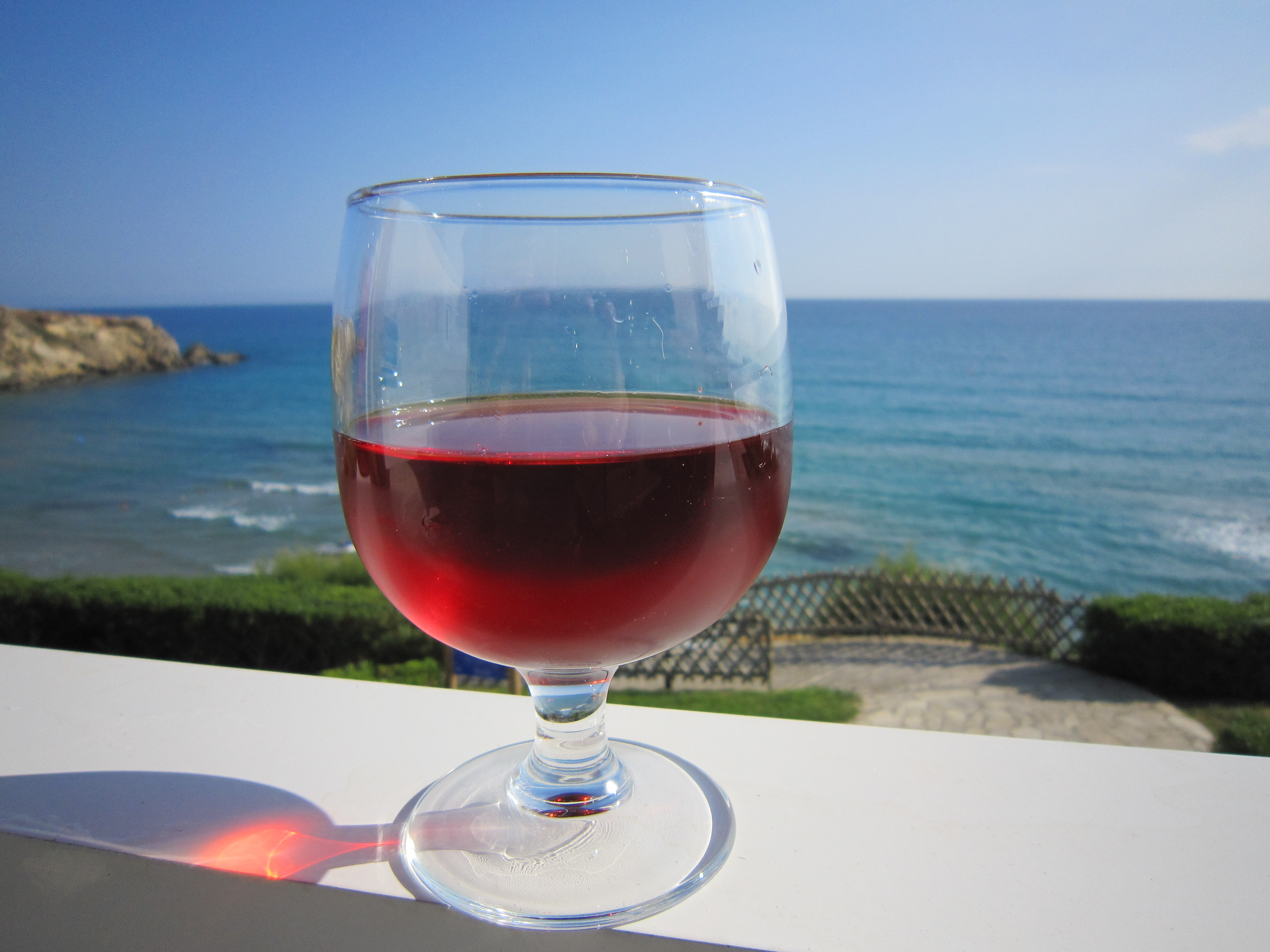
Red Cretan wine

In late medieval Europe, in the 14th to 16th centuries, vino di Candia (Candia is the Italian name for Heraklion) and Crete are wine names listed as highly valued in several sources from western and northern Europe; they were sweet and "hot" wines (hot in a dietary sense). Within the current classification of Greek wine there are several Cretan appellations, including Peza, Archanes, Dafnes and Sitia.

== Soil ==
The combination of particular varieties placed in a unique terroir results in original flavour and perfume to Crete wines. This distinct terroir is a result of calcisol soils in mountain ranges and characteristic Mediterranean climate: the limestone lands range from denser clay to sandy loam, allowing the vine roots to grow deep, reaching water and mineral resources in depth; the weather provides hot and sunny summers and mild, rainy winters. Finally, the north of Africa provides hot winds while the Aegean Sea in the north, the cooling breezes.

== See also ==
- Ancient Greece and wine
- Cretan cuisine
