= Malvasia =

Variety of wine grape

- Grape (Vitis)
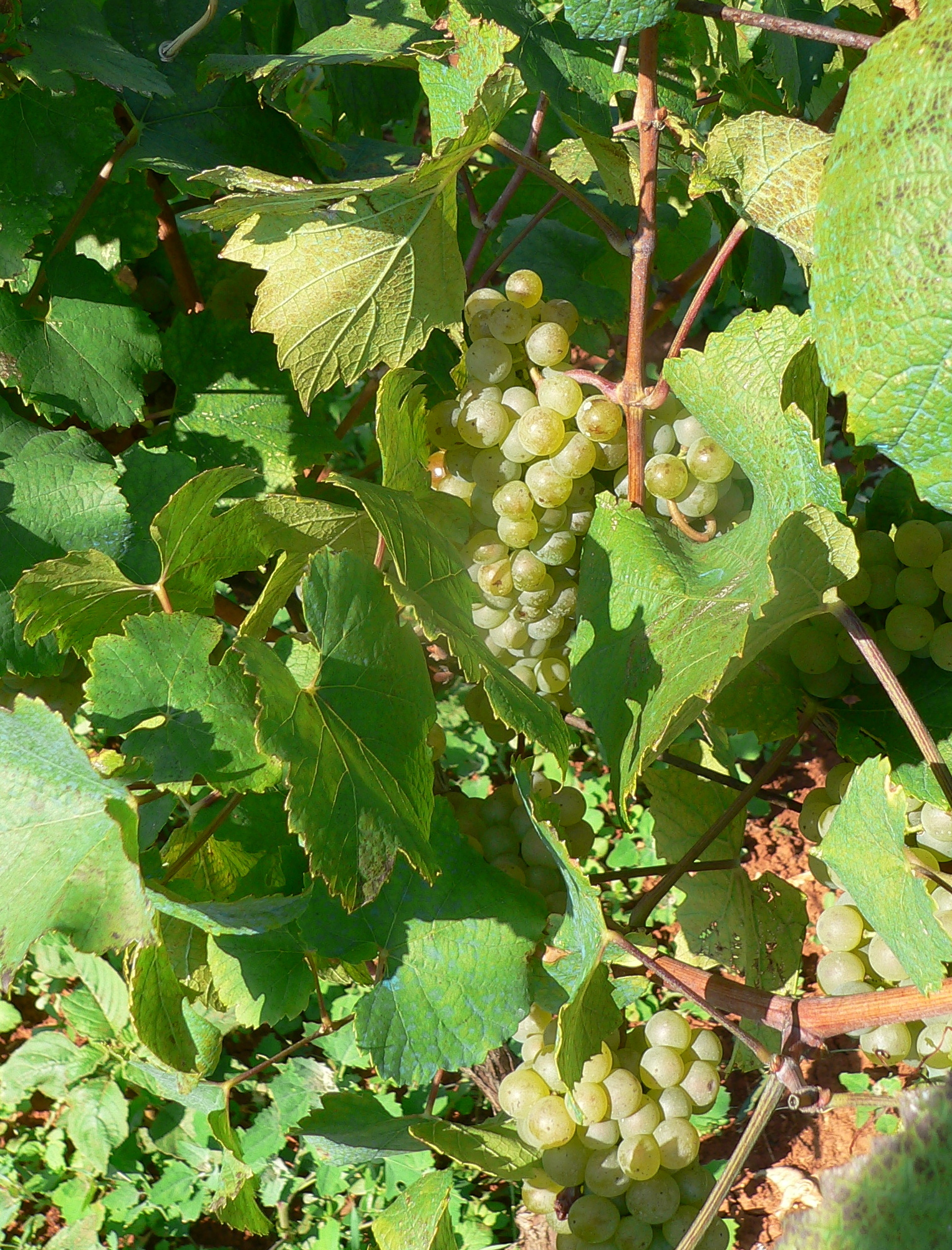
- Malvasia grapes on the vine
- Color of berry skin: White
- Species: Vitis vinifera
- Also called: Malvazia
- Origin: Greece
- Notable regions: Mediterranean, California

Malvasia (Italian: [malvaˈziːa]), also known as Malvazia, is a group of wine grape varieties grown historically in the Mediterranean region and Macaronesia, but now grown in many of the winemaking regions of the world. In the past, the names Malvasia, Malvazia, and Malmsey have been used interchangeably for Malvasia-based wines; however, in modern oenology, "Malmsey" is now used almost exclusively for a sweet variety of Madeira wine made from the Malvasia grape. Grape varieties in this family include Malvasia bianca, Malvasia di Schierano, Malvasia negra, Malvasia nera, Malvasia nera di Brindisi, Malvasia di Candia aromatica, Malvasia odorosissima, and a number of other varieties.

Malvasia wines are produced in Greece (regions of Peloponnese, Cyclades and Crete), Italy (including Friuli-Venezia Giulia, Lombardia, Apulia, Sicily, Lipari, Calabria, Emilia-Romagna, and Sardinia), Slovenia (including Istria), Croatia (including Istria), Corsica, the Iberian Peninsula, the Canary Islands, the island of Madeira, California, Arizona, New Mexico, Australia and Brazil. These grapes are used to produce white (and more rarely red) table wines, dessert wines, and fortified wines of the same name, or are sometimes used as part of a blend of grapes, such as in Vin Santo.

== History ==
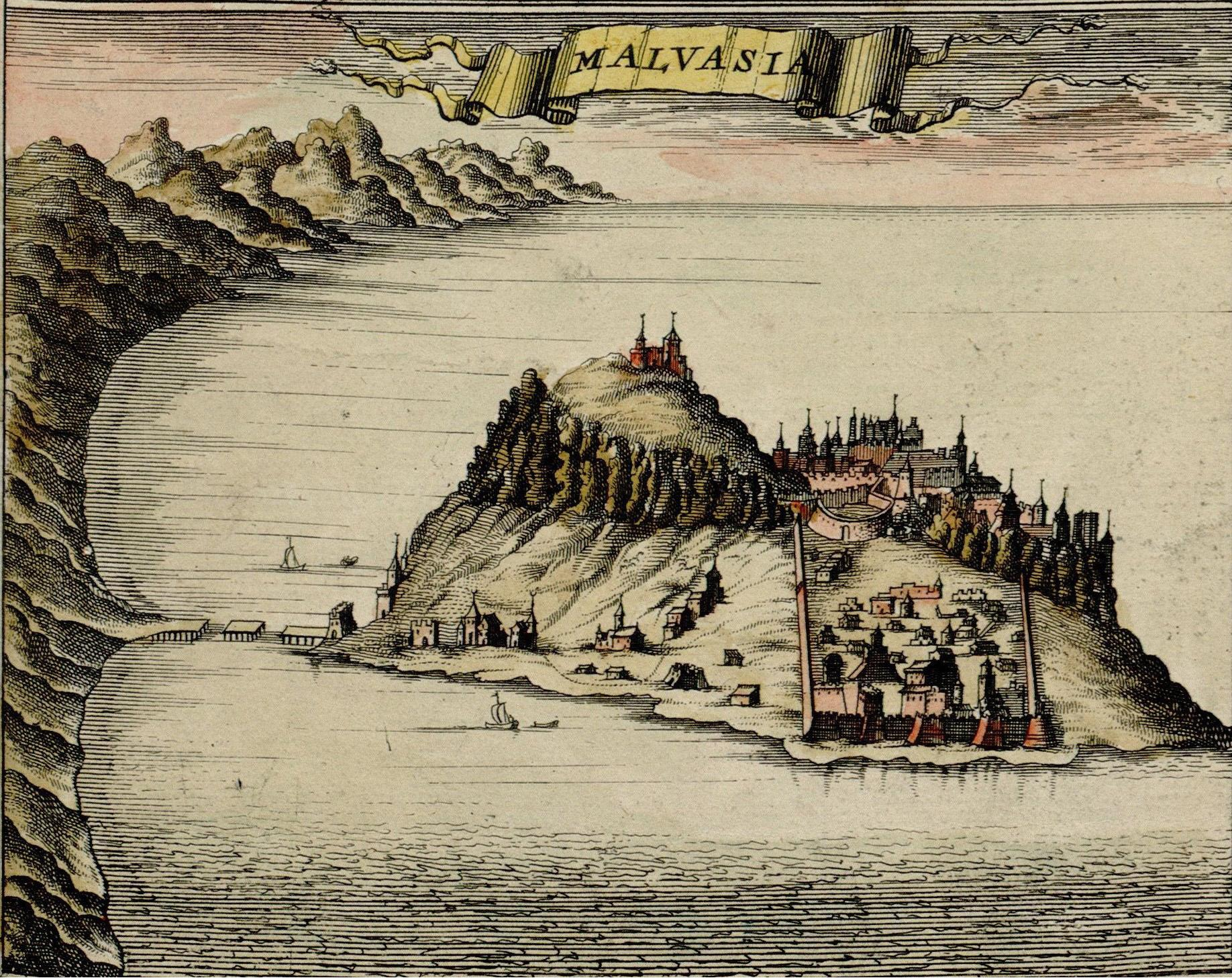
A map of the island fortress of Monemvasia in the 17th century

Most ampelographers believe that the Malvasia family of grapes are of ancient origin, most likely originating in Crete, Greece. The name "Malvasia" comes from the Italian name for Monemvasia, a medieval and early Renaissance Byzantine fortress on the coast of Laconia in southern Greece; the town's port acted as a trading center for wine produced in the eastern Peloponnese and perhaps in some of the Cyclades. During the Middle Ages, the Venetians became so prolific in the trading of Malvasia wine that merchant wine-shops in Venice were known as malvasie. The occasional claim that the name might come from the district of Malevizi, near Iraklion, Crete, is not taken seriously by scholars.

Malmsey was one of the three major wines exported from Greece in medieval times. (For other examples, see Rumney wine and Cretan wine).

English historical tradition associates Malmsey wine with the 1478 death of George Plantagenet, Duke of Clarence, brother of King Edward IV of England. Following his conviction for treason, he was "privately executed" at the Tower of London on 18 February 1478, by tradition in the Bowyer Tower; soon after the event, the rumour gained ground that he was drowned in a butt of malmsey wine, as dramatized in Shakespeare's Richard III.

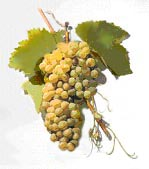
Malvasia grapes

Both Monemvasia and Candia have lent their names to modern grape varieties. In Greece there is a variety known as Monemvasia, evidently named after the port, though now grown primarily in the Cyclades. In western Europe, a common variety of Malvasia is known as Malvasia Bianca di Candia (white malmsey of Crete), from its reputed origin in that area. The Monemvasia grape was long thought to be ancestral to the western European Malvasia varieties, but recent DNA analysis does not suggest a close relationship between Monemvasia and any Malvasia varieties. DNA analysis does, however, suggest that the Athiri wine grape (a variety widely planted throughout Greece) is ancestral to Malvasia.

== Grape varieties and wine regions ==
Most varieties of Malvasia are closely related to Malvasia bianca. One notable exception is the variety known as Malvasia di Candia which is a distinctly different sub-variety of Malvasia. Malvasia bianca is grown widely throughout the world in places like Italy; Sitges in Catalonia, with the renowned variety Malvasia de Sitges; the San Joaquin Valley of California; or the Greek Islands of Paros and Syros. Throughout Central Italy, Malvasia is often blended with Trebbiano to add flavor and texture to the wine. In Rioja, it performs a similar function when blended with Viura.

=== Croatian varieties ===
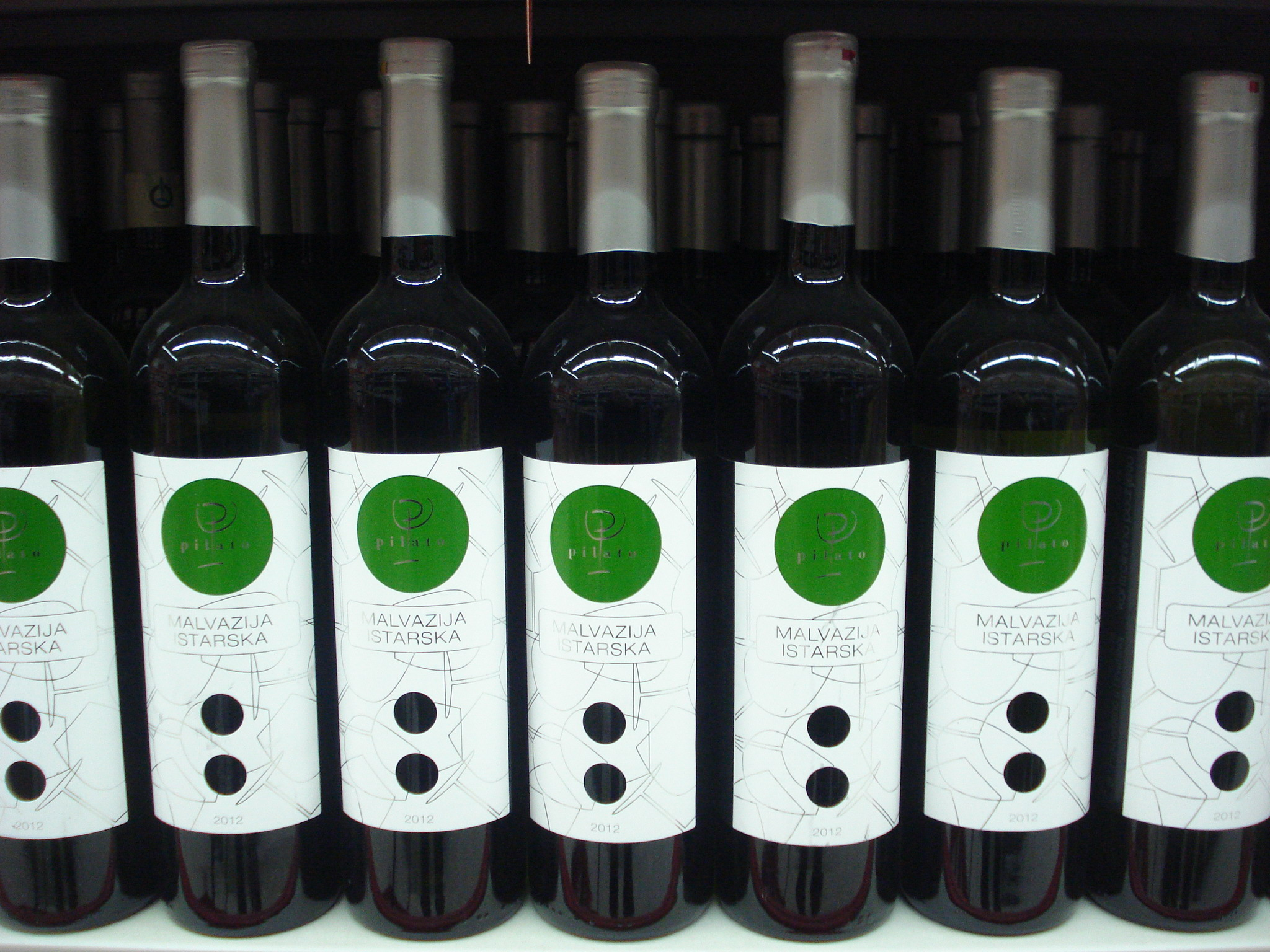
Bottles of Malvazija istarska (Istrian Malvasia) quality wine

Malvazija Istarska

Malvazija Istarska got the name after peninsula of Istria shared between Croatia, Slovenia and Italy (see also Slovene and Italian varieties). It represents one of the main white wines of Croatian Istria and the north Dalmatian coast. The vine was introduced to the area by Venetian merchants who brought cuttings from Greece. The malvasia is called malvazija in Croatian. It is the main white wine in the region.

Other

The Dalmatian Maraština (also known as Rukatac etc.) is identical to the Italian variety Malvasia Lunga.

=== Italian varieties ===
Malvasia Bianca di Candia

Malvasia Bianca di Candia is Italy's most widely planted Malvasia.

Malvasia Istriana

In Italy this wine is grown in the Friuli-Venezia Giulia region in Collio DOC and Isonzo DOC. The name comes from the Istria peninsula, which takes in parts of Croatia, Slovenia, and Italy (see also Croatian and Slovene varieties). The vine was introduced into the area by Venetian merchants who brought cuttings from Greece. Malvasia Istriana is also found in the Colli Piacentini region of Emilia, where it is used to make sparkling wine known locally as champagnino or "little Champagne".

Malvasia di Grottaferrata, Malvasia di Bosa, Malvasia di Planargia

In the 19th century and early 20th century, sweet passito style dessert wines made from the Malvasia grape were held in high esteem and considered among Italy's finest wines. Following the Second World War, lack of interest in the consumer market led to a sharp decline in plantings, with many varieties going to the verge of extinction. Today only a few dedicated producers are still making these Malvasia dessert wines from local varieties including the Malvasia di Grottaferrata in Lazio and the Malvasia di Bosa and Malvasia di Planargia in Sardinia.

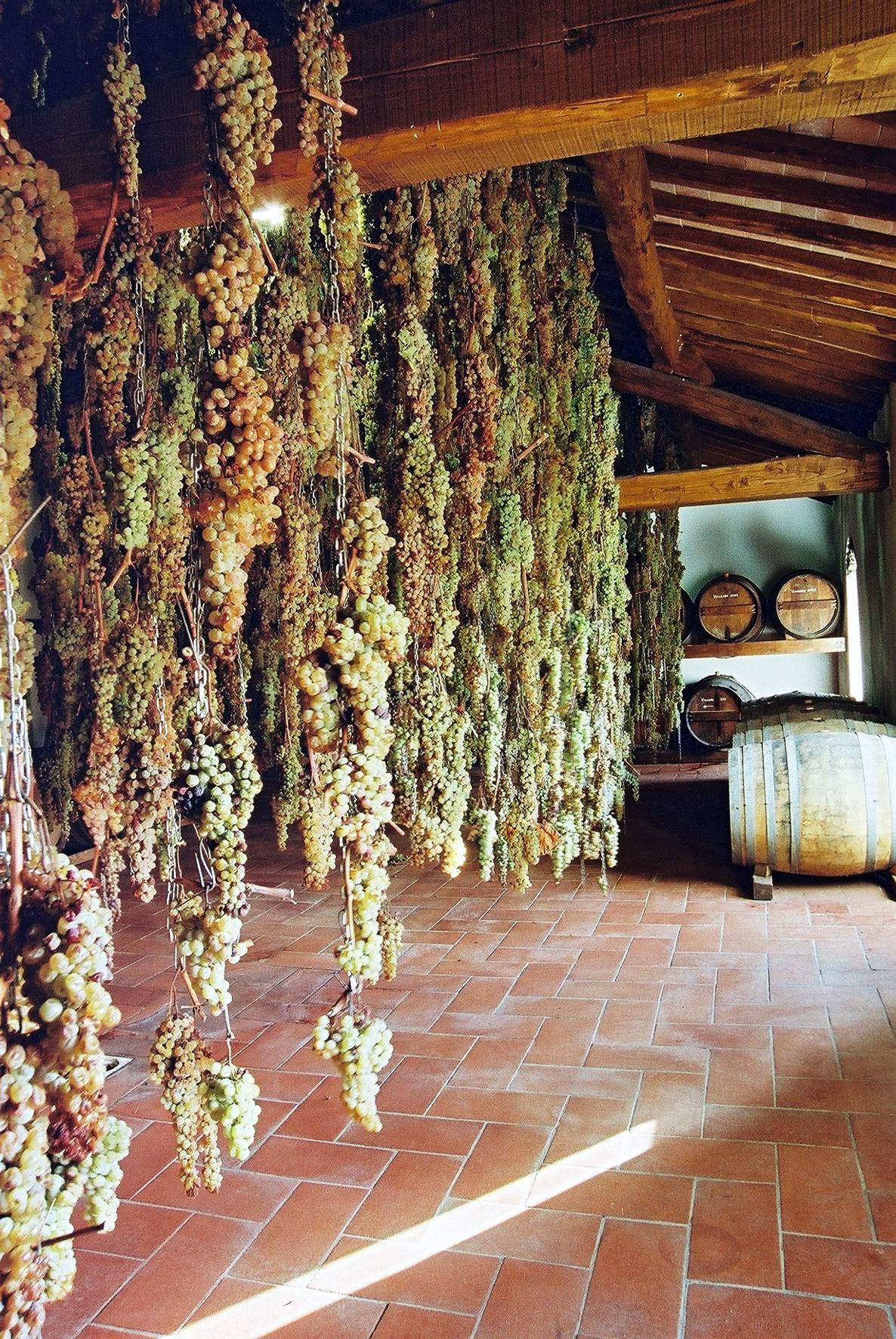
Malvasia and Trebbiano grapes going through the drying process to produce Vin Santo

Malvasia delle Lipari

Since the 1980s, dessert wines made from the Malvasia delle Lipari variety has seen a resurgence in interest on the volcanic Aeolian Islands off the north east coast of Sicily. With distinctive orange notes, this Sicilian wine saw its peak of popularity just before the phylloxera epidemic, when more than 2.6 million gallons (100,000 hectoliters) were produced annually.

Malvasia nera

While most varieties of Malvasia produce white wine, Malvasia nera is a red wine variety that in Italy is used primarily as a blending grape, being valued for the dark color and aromatic qualities it can add to a wine. Piedmont is the only significant region to make this varietal Malvasia nera, with two DOC zones covering less than 250 acres (100 hectares): Malvasia di Casorzo and Malvasia di Castelnuovo Don Bosco. In the Apulian regions of Brindisi and Lecce it is blended with Negroamaro, while in the 1970s & 1980s, it was a frequent blending partner of Sangiovese in Tuscany. In recent times, Cabernet Sauvignon has been supplanting Malvasia nera in Tuscany in both planting and in use as a blending partner with Sangiovese. Other regions growing Malvasia nera include the Bolzano region of Alto Adige, Sardinia, Basilicata and Calabria. Malvasia nera wines are often noted for their rich chocolate notes with black plums and floral aromas.

Malvasia di Candia, Malvasia Puntinata, Malvasia di Lazio

The Lazio region of Frascati is the source of the majority of plantings of Malvasia di Candia, a distinct sub-variety of Malvasia that is not part of the Malvasia bianca branch of the grape family. It is most often used for blending with the related Malvasia Puntinata and Malvasia di Lazio being more highly prized due to their higher acidity and tendency to produce less flabby wines.

=== Spanish varieties ===
In Spain the Malvasía name is a synonym for Alarije, a white grape variety from Extremadura, south-west Spain, but this variety is genetically distinct from the true Malvasias of Malvasi di Lipari (under the Spanish name Malvasía Rosada) and Malvasía de Lanzarote grown in Canary Islands. Malvasía de Lanzarote is a white variety from the Canary Islands, that may be a natural cross between Mavasi di Lipari and Marmajuelo.

Malvasía Rosada

Malvasía Rosada is a red grape variety that is a colour mutation of Malvasi di Lipari / Malvasía de Sitges, and grown on the Canary Islands.

Malvasia Fina

The name Malvasia Fina is for a Portuguese variety that goes under the synonyms Gual and Torrontés in Spain.

Malvasia de Sitges

With recorded presence in Catalonia since early 14th century. Legend has it that a soldier from the Almogàvers fleet commanded by Roger de Flor brought a stem of malvasia from the eastern Mediterranean. But the Chronicle (1325) by Ramon Muntaner acknowledges its name, value and origin. It was widely grown and exported since medieval times until the advent of phylloxera. Being prone to mildew and other attacks, its cultivation now is much diminished, but the wines produced with it are still highly appreciated globally.

This variety is now only grown in the countryside of Sitges and its surroundings. The grape must, once fermented, gives way to a fragrant, sweet drink with a high alcohol content which is usually drunk after celebrations and after the xatonadas. Nevertheless, it is also used in the preparation of various meat dishes, such as duck breast with raisins or pig's trotters. Its unusual bouquet is the result of various factors: proximity to the sea, a late harvest and the considerable alcohol content and acidity of the wine.

Malvasia de Sitges is an authorized vine variety in the DOPs of Penedès and Catalunya.

=== Portuguese varieties ===
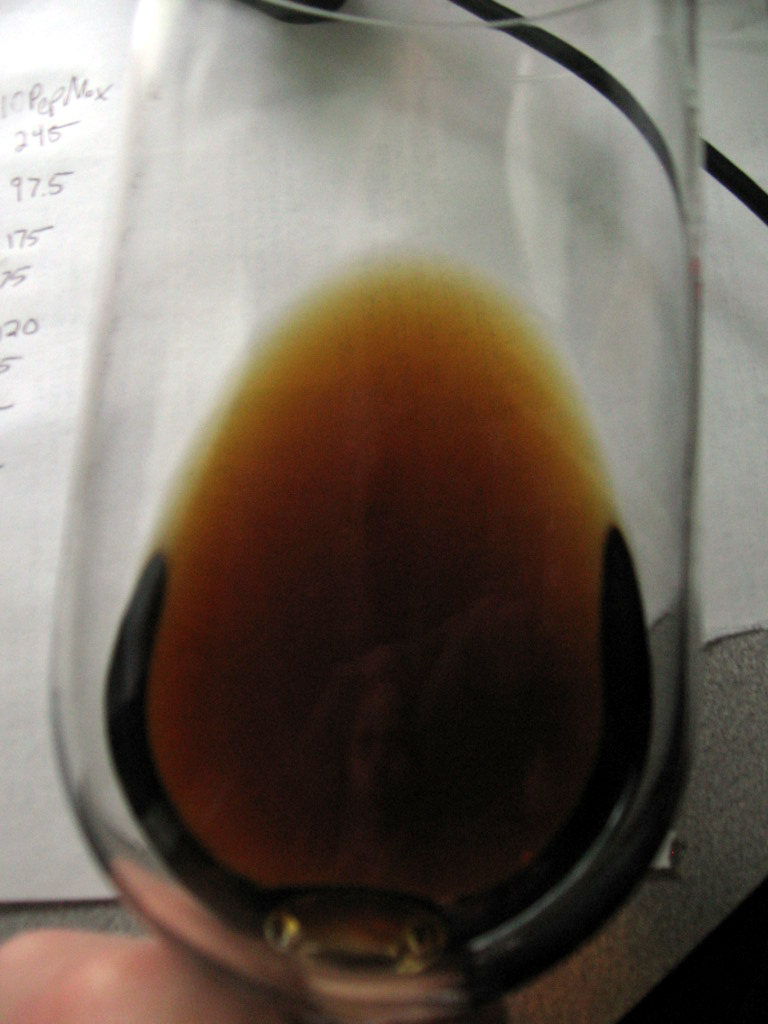
A Malmsey Madeira made from the white Malvasia Candida grape. The dark color comes from the aging process.

In Portugal, there are no fewer than 12 varieties known as "Malvasia". They may or may not be related to true Malvasia.

Malvasia Fina

In 2004, there was nearly 18,533 acres (7500 ha) of Malvasia Fina grown in Portugal where it is also known as Boal (though it is most likely not related to the grape Bual which is used to produce the Boal style of Madeira). Malvasia Fina is found in the Douro where it is a permitted grape in the production of white Port. It is also found in the Tejo and the Dão DOC where it is grown on vineyard land located at high elevations.

Malvasia Candida

Malvasia Candida (different from the variety known as Malvasia di Candia) has been historically grown on the island of Madeira being used to produce the sweetest style of Madeira wine known Malmsey.

Malvasia Rei

Malvasia Rei is believed to be the Palomino grown in Spain for Sherry production which may be related to the Malvasia family. In Portugal, Malvasia Rei is grown in the Douro, Beiras and Lisboa region.

Malvasia Corada

Malvasia Corada is a synonym used in the Douro for an obscure white wine grape variety known as Vital that may or may not be related to true Malvasia.

Malvasia da Trincheira

Malvasia da Trincheira is a synonym used in the Douro for the white Port grape Folgasão that may or may not be related to true Malvasia.

=== Slovene variety ===
Istrska Malvazija or simply Malvazija
(Italian Malvasia Istriana and Croatian Malvazija Istarska)

In Slovenian Istria the malvasia grape is grown in Koper area, especially on Debeli Rtič, Škocjan, Kortina and Labor. It is also grown in Italy and Croatia (see Italian and Croatian varieties). The vine was introduced to the area in the 14th century by Venetian merchants who brought cuttings from Greece. Over matured grapes give a dessert wine with non-fermented sugars and high alcohol level (around 12%) called sweet malvasia (Slovene and Croatian: sladka/slatka malvazija).

=== Common synonyms ===
The various varieties of Malvasia are known under a wide range of synonyms including Malvasier in Germany, Malvazija and Malvazia in Istria. Despite its similar-sounding name, the French grape varieties (it is a widely used synonym) referred to variously as "Malvoisie" are not related to Malvasia. The one possible exception may be the Malvoisie of Corsica that ampelographers believe is actually the Vermentino grape that may be related to Malvasia. Other synonyms for the various sub-varieties of Malvasia include Uva Greca, Rojal, Subirat, Blanquirroja, Blancarroga, Tobia, Cagazal and Blanca-Rioja.

== Viticulture ==
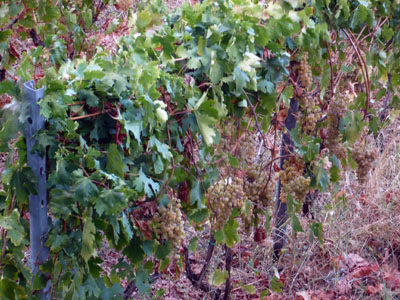
Malvasia grapes on the vine

While differences among the many sub-varieties of Malvasia exist, there are some common viticultural characteristics of the family. Malvasia tends to prefer dry climates with vineyards planted on sloping terrain of well-drained soils. In damp conditions, the vine can be prone to developing various grape diseases such as mildew and rot. The rootstock is moderately vigorous and capable of producing high yields if not kept in check.

== Wines ==
Given the broad expanse of the Malvasia family, generalizations about the Malvasia wine are difficult to pinpoint. Most varieties of Malvasia are derived from Malvasia bianca which is characterized by its deep color, noted aromas and the presence of some residual sugar. The red varieties of Malvasia tend to make wines with pale, pinkish to light red color. In their youth, Malvasia wines are characterized by their heavy body that is often described as "round" or "fat" and soft texture in the mouth. Common aroma notes associated with Malvasia include peaches, apricots and white currants. Red Malvasia wines are characterized by a richness and chocolate notes. Fortified Malvasia, such as Madeira, are noted for their intense smokey notes and sharp acidity. As Malvasia ages, the wines tend to take on more nutty aromas and flavors though many Malvasia have a short life span of only a few years after vintage.

=== Malmsey ===
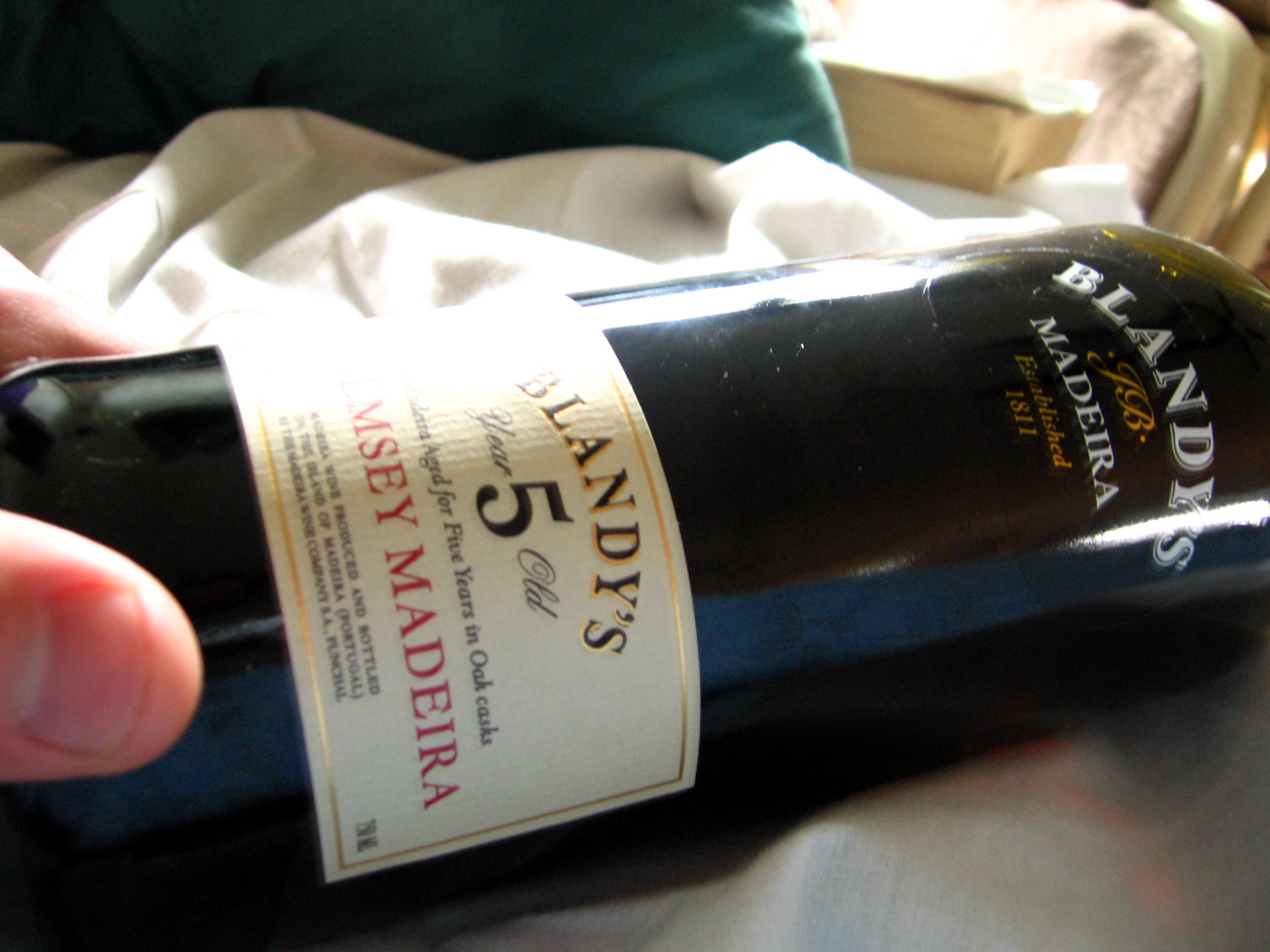
A bottle of Malmsey Madeira

In the past, the names "Malvasia" and "Malmsey" occurred interchangeably. As of 2014, however, "Malvasia" generally refers to unfortified white table or dessert wines produced from this grape, while "Malmsey" refers to a sweet variety of Madeira wine, though this is also sometimes called "Malvasia" or "Malvazia". Further confusion results from the fact that, in the past, the term "Malmsey" referred to any very sweet Madeira wine, regardless of the grape variety involved. This resulted from the devastation of Madeiran vineyards by phylloxera in the late 19th century, which greatly reduced the production of Malvasia and other "noble grape" varieties on Madeira for the next century. As a result, most non-vintage-dated "Malmsey" was made from the widely grown Tinta Negra Mole or even from fox grape varieties. This changed when Portugal entered the European Union (EU) in 1986; EU regulations required that any wine bearing the name "Malmsey" contain at least 85% Malvasia grapes. Even further confusion results from the fact that vintage-dated Malmseys are often labeled "Malvasia" or "Malvazia", probably because the relatively rare vintage Malvasias were always made with Malvasia grapes even when most non-vintage "Malmsey" came from lesser varieties. Some companies occasionally use the name "Malvasia" or "Malvazia" for non-vintage Madeiras, especially those primarily marketed to Portuguese-speaking countries.

== See also ==
- List of Port wine grapes
- List of Portuguese grape varieties
