= Rajma =

Red kidney beans dish, originating from the Indian subcontinent

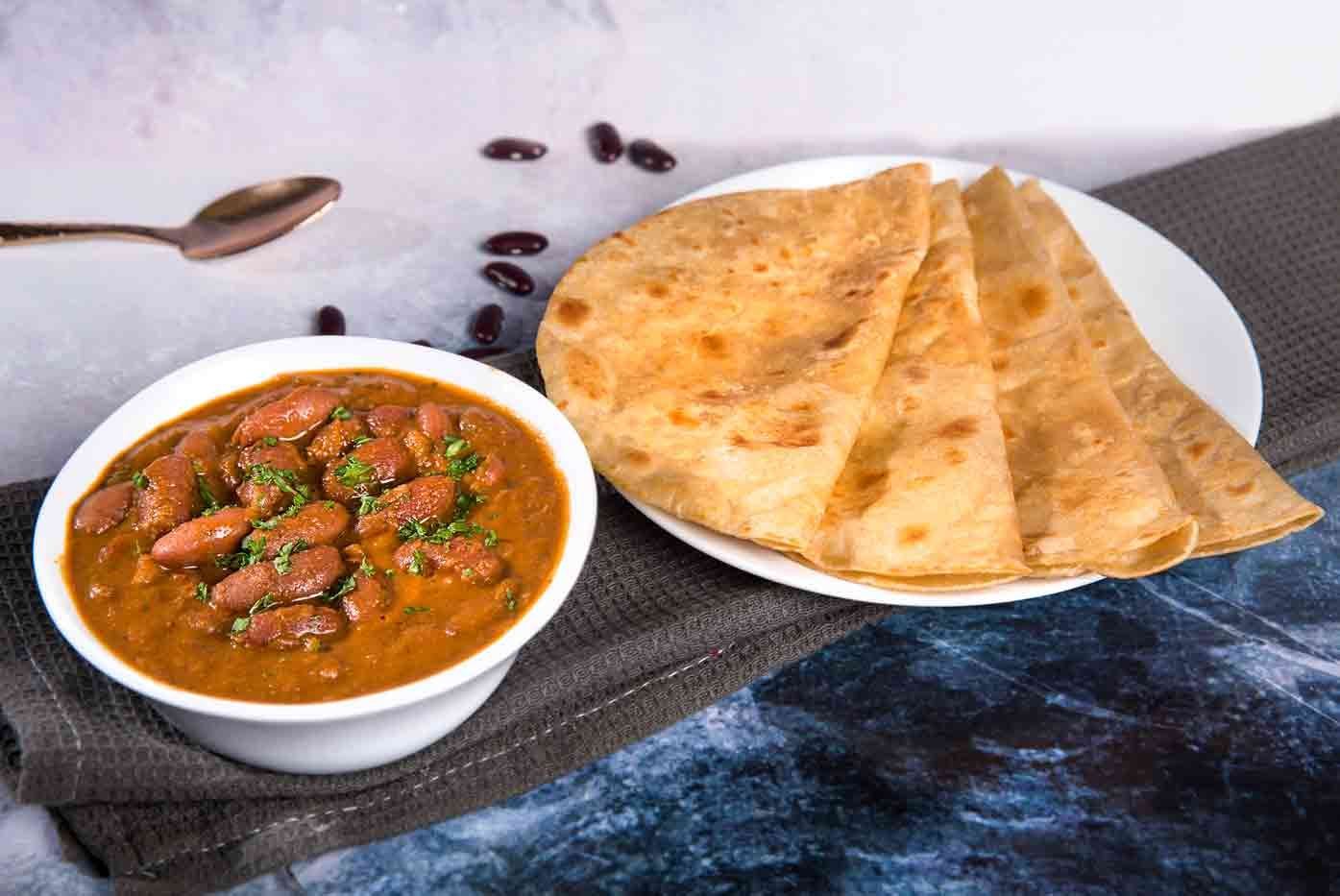
- Rajma served with roti
- Alternative names: Razma, Laal Lobia, राजमा, راجما
- Place of origin: Indian subcontinent
- Region or state: India, Nepal and Pakistan
- Associated cuisine: India
- Main ingredients: Kidney beans
- Food energy (per serving): 100 grams of boiled Rajma beans contain 140 calories

Rājmā (Note: [raːdʒmaː] (Hindi and Nepali: Hindi: राजमा, Urdu: راجما); also known as rajmah, rāzmā, or lal lobia) is a vegetarian dish, originating from the Indian subcontinent, consisting of red kidney beans in a thick gravy with many Indian whole spices, and is usually served over rice, in a meal called Rajma Chawal. It is part of the regular diet in Northern India, Nepal, and Punjab province of Pakistan. The dish developed after the red kidney bean was brought to the Indian subcontinent from Mexico.

== Regional variants ==
Rajma is a popular dish in the Northern states of India, as well as in Pakistan and Nepal.

Some of the best Rajma is said to be grown in the north Indian states of Himachal Pradesh, Uttarakhand, and the Jammu region of Jammu and Kashmir. Rajma Chawal served with chutney of Anardana (pomegranate) is a famous dish in Peerah, a town in Ramban district of Jammu and Kashmir, and Assar/Baggar in Doda district of Jammu and Kashmir.

Going further, the Rajma of Chinta Valley in Doda district, a short distance from the town of Bhaderwah of Jammu province are said to be amongst the most popular. These are smaller in size than most Rajma grown in plains and have a slightly sweetish taste.

The combination of rajma and rice is generally listed as a top favorite of North Indians and Nepalis. Rajma is prepared with onion, garlic and many spices in India, and it is one of the staple foods in Nepal.

Rajma Masala is a popular dish in the Northern states of India, as well as in Pakistan. The traditional way of cooking Rajma Masala is to soak the kidney beans overnight in water, cook them in a pressure cooker and then mix in a "bhuna masala" made with chopped onions, diced tomatoes, ginger, garlic, and a mélange of spices including cumin, coriander, turmeric, garam masala, and chili powder.

Rajma may also be eaten with Western-style bread, such as white or whole wheat bread, among others. It can be eaten either as a sandwich or with the rajma as a topping. Particularly in the Indian diaspora, it may also be eaten with other grain-based foods, such as tortillas or pita bread. This can be due to lack of availability of traditional Indian ingredients, such as atta for making rotis, in the country they live in. It can also be due to convenience, as these ingredients may require going to specialty Indian grocery stores if one exists nearby, even if frozen or ready-made options are available. It may also be eaten similarly to pav bhaji, called "rajma pav" or "rajma pav bhaji".

== Nutrition ==
A 100 grams (3.5 oz) serving of boiled Rajma beans contains about 140 calories, 5.7 grams (0.20 oz) of protein, 5.9 grams (0.21 oz) of fat and 18 grams (0.63 oz) of carbohydrates.

== See also ==
- List of legume dishes
- Indian cuisine
- Gigandes plaki, a similar Greek dish
- Pilaki and Piyaz, similar Turkish bean dishes
- Red beans and rice, a Louisiana Creole specialty
