= Barbunya pilaki =

Olive oil-based Turkish bean dish

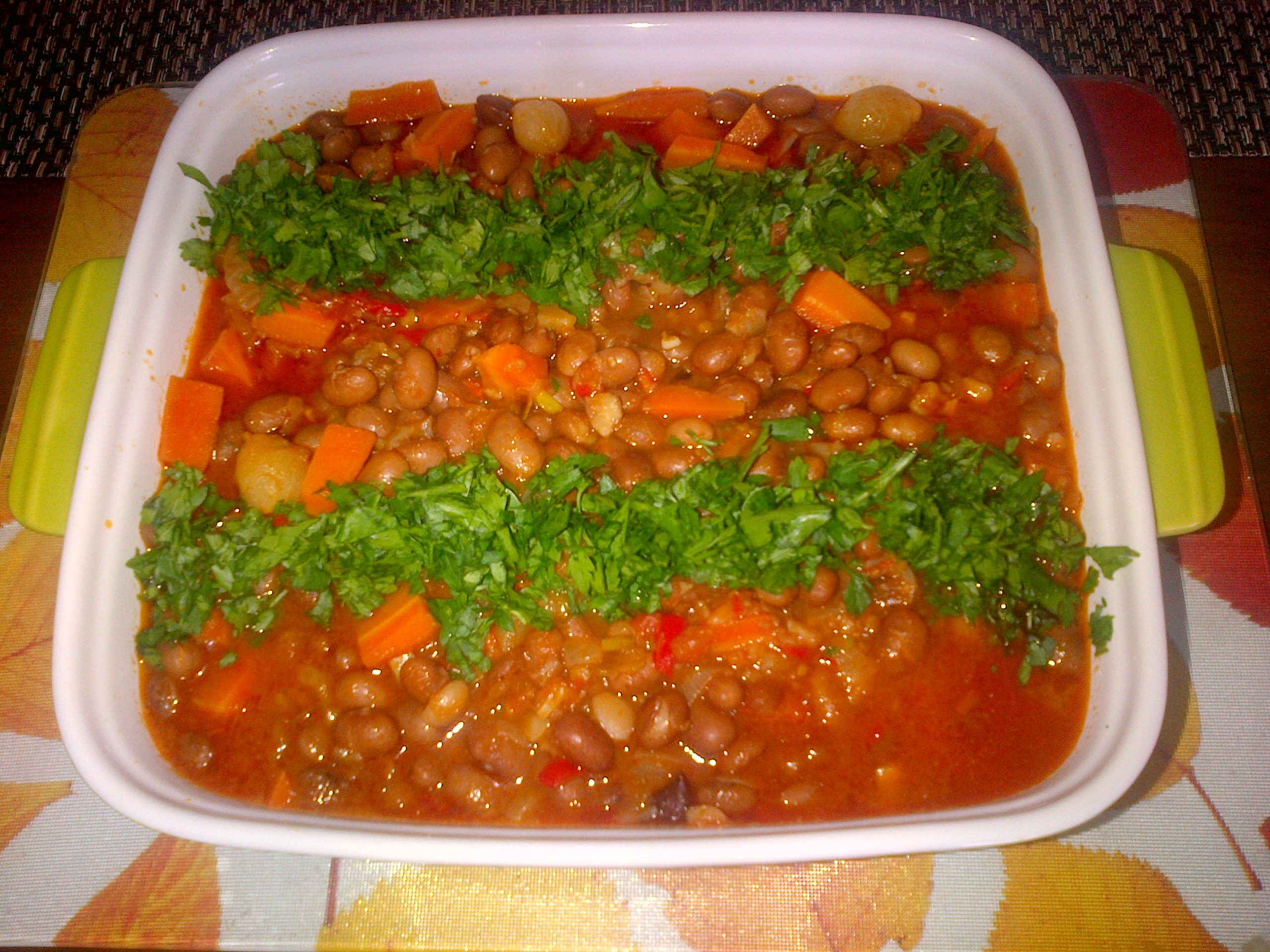
- Barbunya pilaki served cold with lemon and parsley
- Course: Meze or main course
- Place of origin: Turkey
- Region or state: Eastern Mediterranean
- Serving temperature: Cold or room temperature
- Main ingredients: Borlotti beans (barbunya), olive oil, vegetables
- Variations: Regional spice and herb variations
- Similar dishes: Plaki, gigantes plaki

Barbunya pilaki is a traditional Turkish dish made with borlotti beans (known as barbunya in Turkish) stewed in olive oil with a medley of vegetables, garlic, tomato, and seasonings. A staple in the category of zeytinyağlı (olive oil-based) dishes, it is typically served cold or at room temperature as a meze or a light vegetarian main course.

== Etymology and definition ==
The word barbunya refers specifically to borlotti beans, also known as cranberry beans, which are recognized for their mottled red-pink skins before cooking. Pilaki denotes a style of cooking common in Turkish cuisine in which legumes or fish are gently simmered in olive oil with aromatics. The term derives from the Greek word plaki (πλακί), pointing to shared culinary roots across the Eastern Mediterranean.

== Ingredients and preparation ==
The dish commonly includes borlotti beans (soaked and cooked or canned), onions, garlic, carrots, tomatoes or tomato paste, olive oil, sugar, lemon juice, parsley, dill, and occasionally potatoes. The beans are typically parboiled and then combined with sautéed vegetables in olive oil. Tomato paste is added to form a light stew, which is simmered until the beans and vegetables are fully tender. Lemon juice and sugar are added to balance the savory and acidic flavors. The dish is chilled before serving to allow the flavors to meld.

== Culinary context ==
Barbunya pilaki is part of a broader family of Turkish vegetarian olive oil dishes called zeytinyağlılar, traditionally served cold or at room temperature. These dishes are often enjoyed as part of a meze spread, especially in summer, and are commonly served with bread and lemon wedges.

Food writer Sally Butcher describes it as emblematic of the Turkish tradition of turning humble beans into "a feast," reflecting both frugality and refinement in Middle Eastern vegetarian cooking.

== Regional variations ==
While the essential ingredients remain consistent, regional and household variations exist:

- In the Aegean region, the dish may be heavier on olive oil and fresh tomatoes.
- In Istanbul, diced potatoes are often included for a heartier texture.
- Dill is a common garnish in coastal areas, while parsley is more prevalent in central Turkey.
- Some versions may include a pinch of red pepper flakes or paprika for warmth.

== See also ==
- Plaki – the Greek counterpart
- Gigandes plaki – Greek dish of giant beans in tomato sauce
- Piyaz – another Turkish bean dish
- Meze
