= Fasoulia =

Green bean and tomato dish

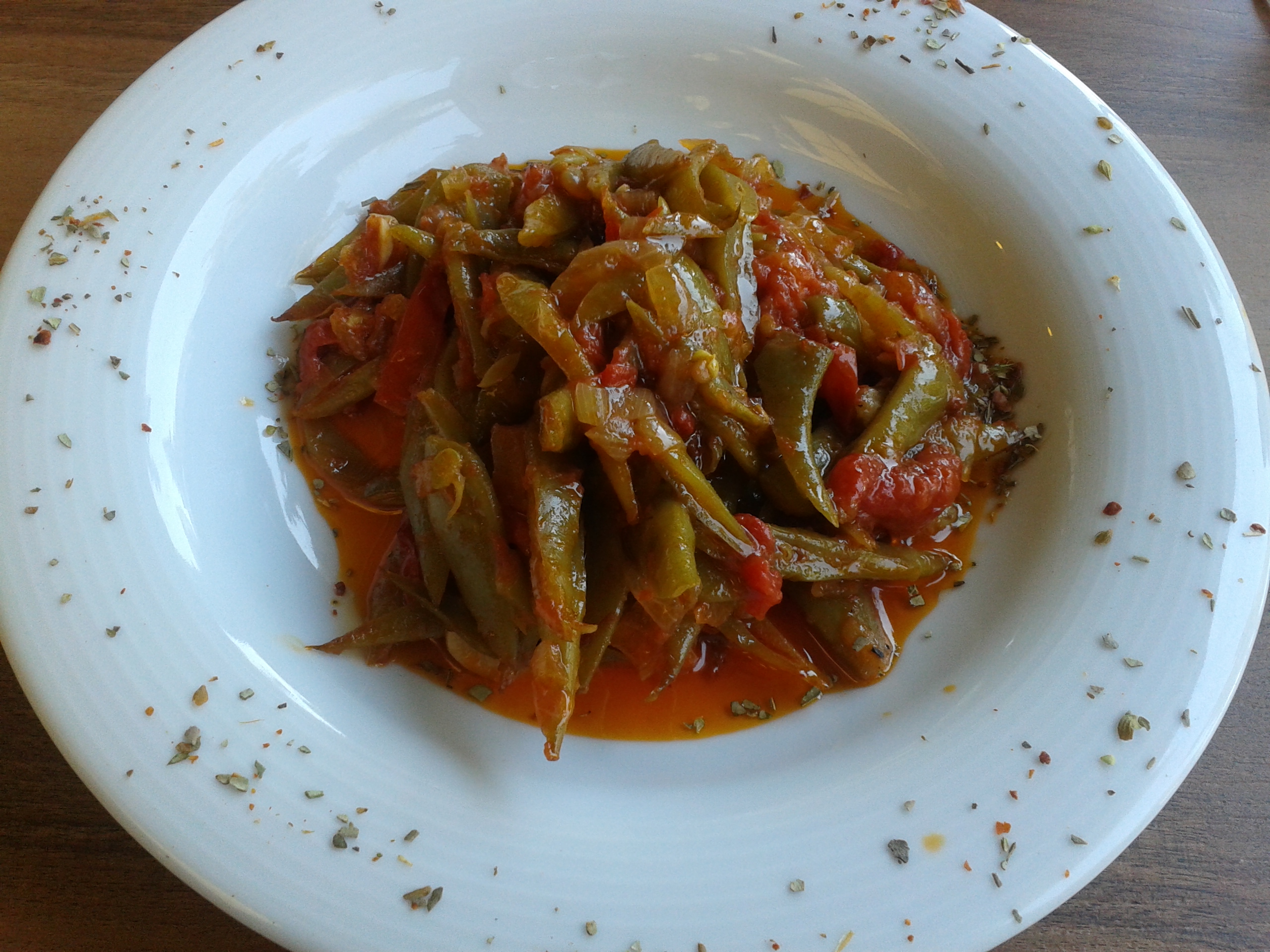
- Turkish Zeytinyağlı fasulye
- Place of origin: Turkey
- Main ingredients: Tomatoes, green beans
- Similar dishes: Fasolada

Fasoulia is a stew of green beans, tomato sauce, and olive oil found in the cuisines of the Balkans, Turkey, and the Levant.

== History ==
Green beans and tomtaoes originated in South America, and were introduced to Egypt and the Balkans by the Spanish during the Columbian exchange.

== Regional varieties ==
Fasoulia may use different varieties of beans in parts of the Arab world; Lebanese fasoulia replaces green beans with white beans and typically includes lamb meat. A vegetarian version is popular among Turkish Jews.

Zeytinyağlı fasulye is a vegetarian dish found in Turkish cuisine of green beans cooked in olive oil. Zeytinyağlı refers to dishes cooked in olive oil.

== See also ==
- Gigantes plaki, Greek white bean and tomato dish
- Kuru fasulye, Turkish white bean and tomato dish
- Baked beans, European white bean and tomato dish
- Fasole cu cârnați, Romanian white bean and tomato dish
