= Vegetarian cuisine =

Food not including meat

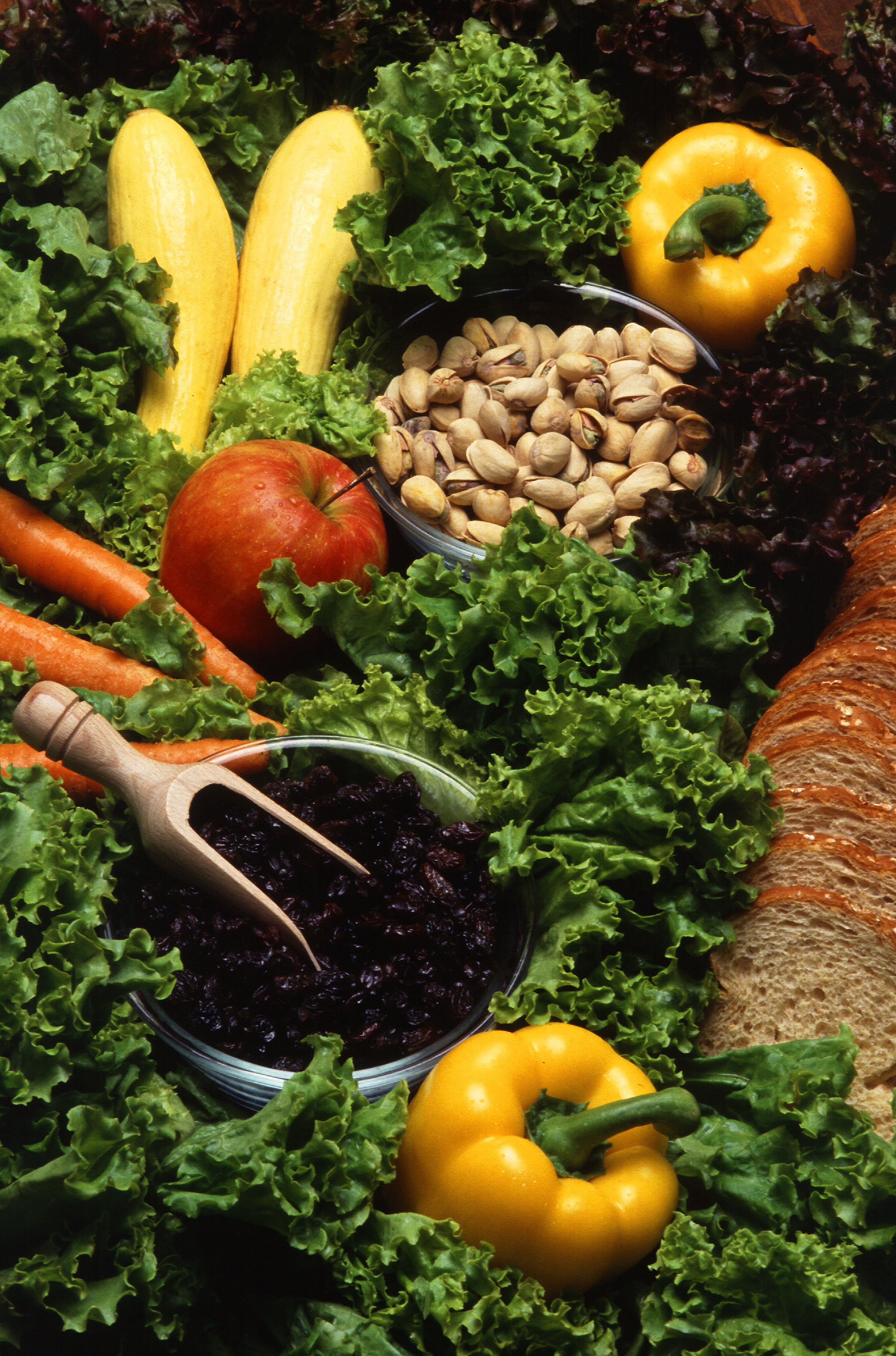
A variety of vegetarian food ingredients that are also vegan.

Vegetarian cuisine, also known as plant-based cuisine, is a style of cooking defined by the inclusion of grains, legumes, nuts, vegetables, fruits, dairy, and sometimes eggs, and by the exclusion of meat and animal tissue products (such as gelatin or animal-derived rennet). Vegetarian cuisine meets vegetarian standards. Vegetarian cuisine differs from vegan cuisine, which excludes all animal products including dairy and eggs.

== Common vegetarian foods ==
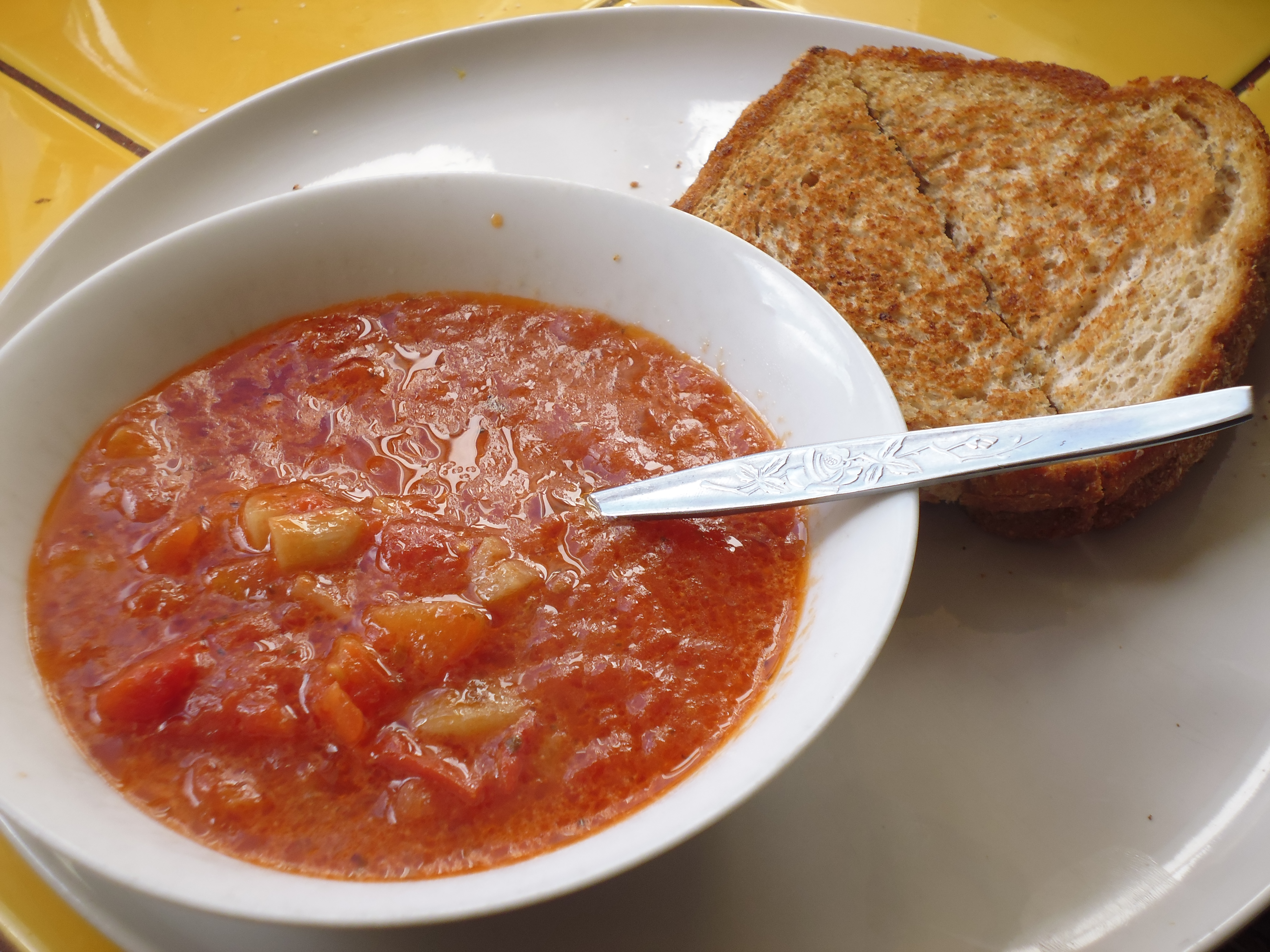
Vegetable soup and cheese sandwich, a meal which is suitable for vegetarians but not vegans

Vegetarian cuisine includes consumption of foods containing vegetable protein, vitamin B12, and other nutrients. Food regarded as suitable for all vegetarians (including vegans) typically includes:

- Cereals/grains: barley, buckwheat, corn, fonio, hempseed, maize, millet, oats, quinoa, rice, rye, sorghum, triticale, wheat; derived products such as flour (dough, bread, baked goods, cornflakes, dumplings, granola, Muesli, pasta etc.).
- Vegetables (fresh, canned, frozen, pureed, dried or pickled); derived products such as vegetable sauces like chili sauce and vegetable oils.
- Edible fungi (fresh, canned, dried or pickled). Edible fungi include some mushrooms and cultured microfungi which can be involved in fermentation of food (yeasts and moulds) such as Aspergillus oryzae and Fusarium venenatum, although fungi is rarely considered non-vegetarian due to it not being a plant.
- Fruit (fresh, canned, frozen, pureed, candied or dried); derived products such as jam and marmalade.
- Legumes: beans (including soybeans and soy products such as miso, edamame, soy milk, soy yogurt, tempeh, tofu and TVP), chickpeas, lentils, peas, peanuts; derived products such as peanut butter.
- Tree nuts and seeds; derived products such as nut butter.
- Herbs, spices and wild greens such as dandelion, sorrel or nettle.
- Meat analogues, which mimic the taste, texture, and appearance of meat and are often used in recipes that traditionally contained meat.
- Other foods such as seaweed-derived products such as agar, which has the same function as animal-bone-derived gelatin.
- Beverages such as beer, coffee, hot chocolate, lemonade, tea or wine—although some beers and wines may have elements of animal products as fining agents including fish bladders, egg whites, gelatin and skim milk.

Foods not suitable for vegans, but acceptable for some other types of vegetarians:

- Dairy products (butter, cheese (except for cheese containing rennet of animal origin), milk, yogurt (excluding yogurt made with gelatin) etc.) –eaten by lacto-ovo vegetarians and lacto vegetarians.
- Eggs – eaten by lacto-ovo vegetarians and ovo-vegetarians
- Honey

Vegetarians by definition cannot consume meat or animal tissue products, with no other universally adopted change in their diet. However, in practice, compared to non-vegetarians, vegetarians on average have an increased consumption of:

- Fruits
- Vegetables
- Avocados
- Non-fried potatoes
- Whole grains
- Legumes
- Soy foods
- Nuts
- Seeds

In comparison to non-vegetarians, practicing vegetarians on average have a decreased consumption of:

- Dairy products
- Eggs
- Refined grains
- Added fats
- Sweets
- Snacks
- Non-water (often sweetened) beverages

This difference is observed, but is not required to be vegetarian. Nevertheless, it is relevant when considering research into the health effects of adopting a vegetarian diet. A diet consisting only of sugar candies, for example, while technically also vegetarian, would be expected to have a much different outcome for health compared to what is called "a vegetarian diet" culturally and what is most commonly adopted by vegetarians. It is also important to note that overeating occurs because of a misconception of hunger. By changing your perspective on calories versus nutrients, it becomes much easier to adapt to the healthier lifestyle of vegetarianism.

== Traditional vegetarian cuisine ==
These are some of the most common dishes that vegetarians eat without substitution of ingredients. Such dishes include, from breakfasts to dinnertime desserts:

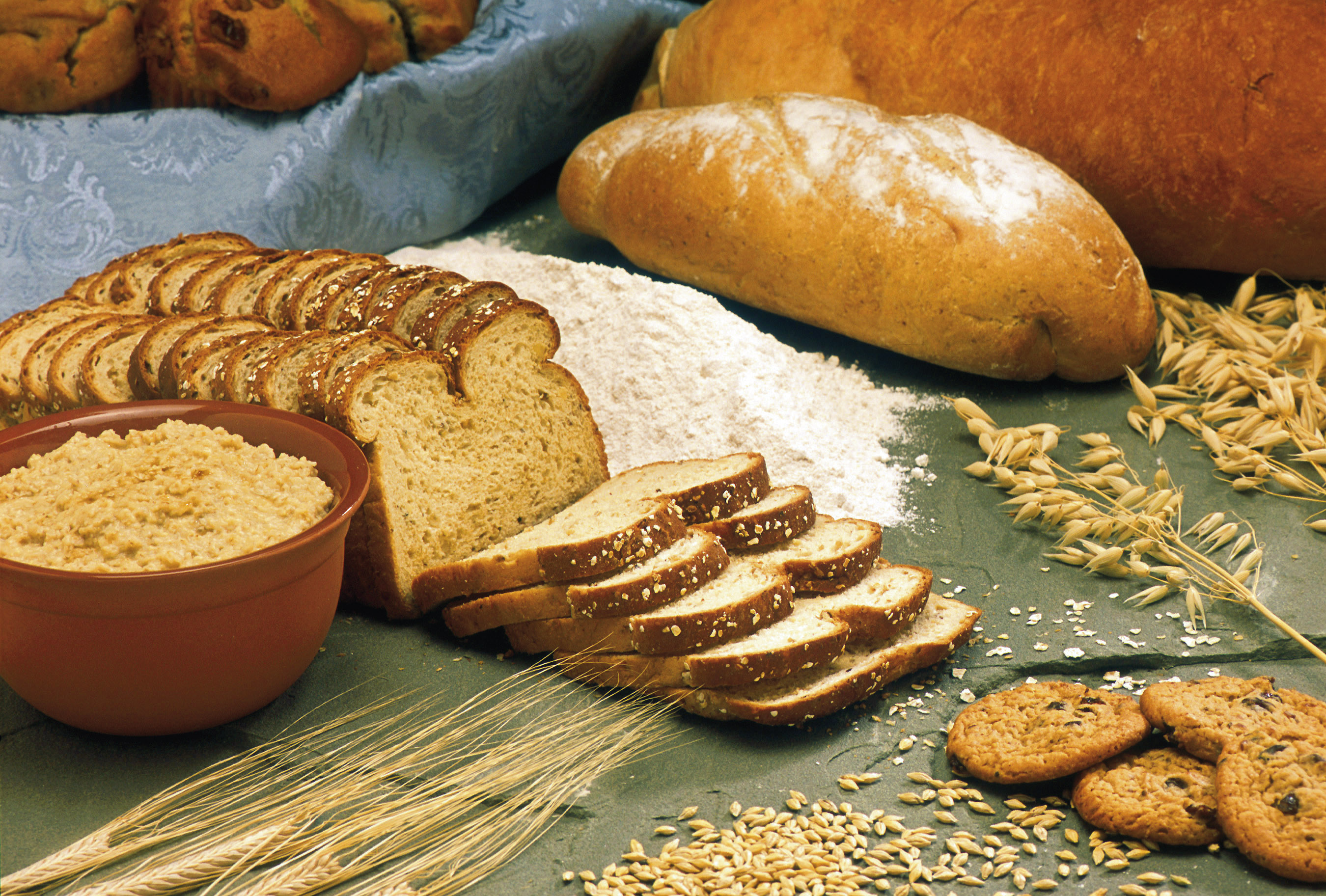
Vegetarian food products made from cereal grains.

- Traditionally, Brahmin cuisines in most parts of India, except Jammu and Kashmir, Odisha and West Bengal, are strictly vegetarian. Onion and garlic are not eaten in a strict sattvic and lacto vegetarian diet.
- Gujarati cuisine and Rajasthani cuisine from the states of Gujarat and Rajasthan are predominantly vegetarian.
- Many bean, pasta, potato, rice, and bulgur/couscous dishes, stews, soups and stir-fries.
- Cereals and oatmeal, granola bars, etc.
- Fresh fruit and most salads
- Potato salad, baba ganoush, pita-wraps or burrito -wraps, vegetable pilafs, baked potatoes or fried potato-skins with various toppings, corn on the cob, smoothies
- Many sandwiches, such as cheese on toast, and cold sandwiches including roasted eggplant, mushrooms, bell peppers, cheeses, avocado and other sandwich ingredients
- Numerous side dishes, such as mashed potatoes, scalloped potatoes, some bread stuffing, seasoned rice, and macaroni and cheese.
- Classical Buddhist cuisine in Asia served at temples and restaurants with a green sign indicating vegetarian food only near temples. Onion and garlic is not eaten in a strict Buddhist diet.

=== National cuisines ===
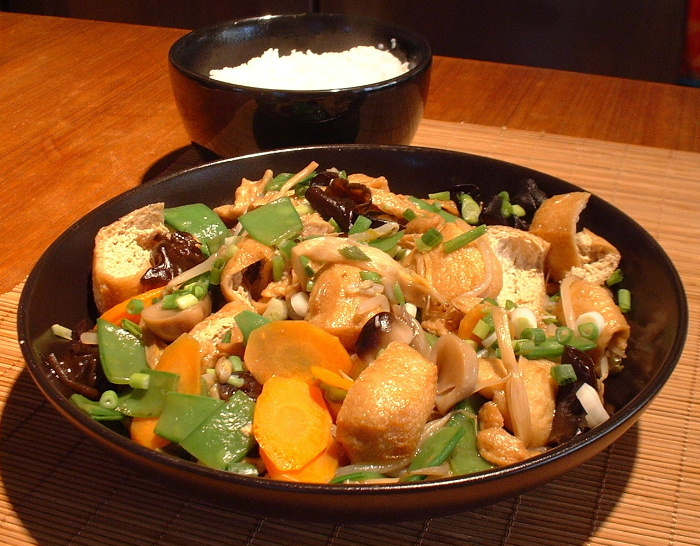
Buddha's delight, a famous Chinese vegetarian dish.

- Chinese (and other East Asian) dishes based on the main ingredients being mushroom, noodles, eggplant, string beans, broccoli, rice, tofu, most tong sui or mixed vegetables.
Indian vegetarian thali

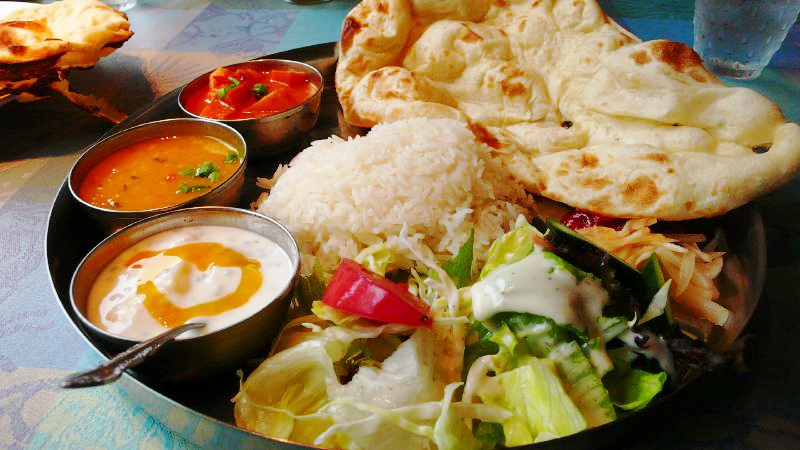
North Indian style vegetarian thali.

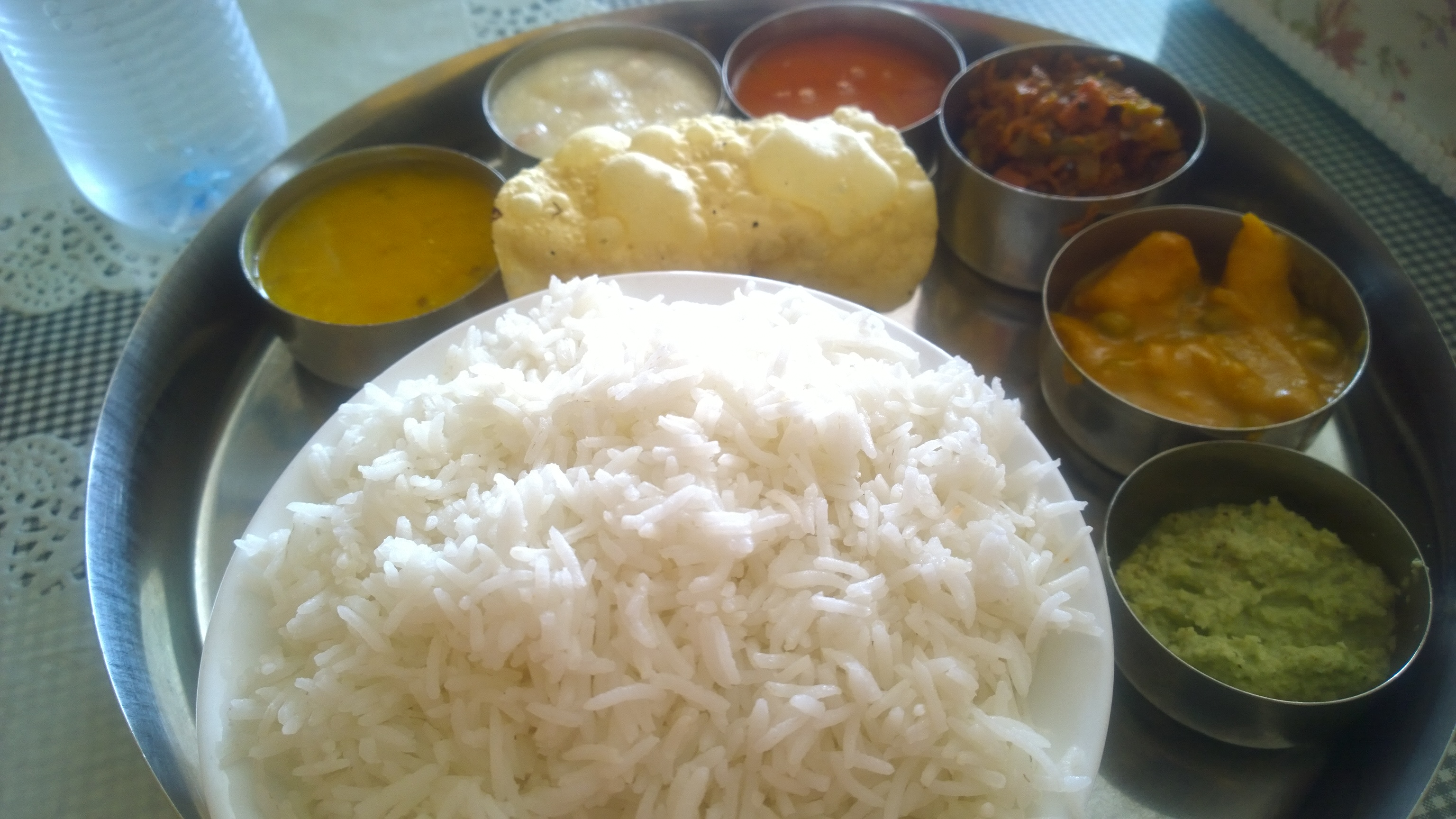
South Indian style vegetarian thali.

- Georgian cuisine contains some vegetarian dishes. Lobio, lobiani, ajapsandali, mchadi, pkhali and khinkali with mushroom filling are all examples of Georgian dishes that are vegetarian. Eggplant (called badrijani or badrijnis in Georgian) is used to make vegetarian dishes such as nigvzinai badrijani (fried eggplant stuffed with walnut paste), badrijnis borani (chopped and fried eggplant), badrijnis khizilala (chopped eggplant with pomegranate seeds) and badrijani mtsvanilit (fried eggplant with fresh herbs).
- Indian cuisine in Asia is replete with vegetarian dishes, many of which can be traced to religious traditions (such as Jain and Hindu). Gujarati cuisine of India is predominantly vegetarian among other Indian cuisines: Gujarati thali is very famous among Indians. There are many vegetarian Indian foods such as pakora, samosa, khichris, Pulao, raitas, rasam, bengain bharta, chana masala, some kormas, sambar, jalfrezis, saag aloo, subjis (vegetable dishes) such as bindi subji, gobi subji, Punjabi chole, aloo matar and much South Indian food such as dosas, idlis and vadas. Chapati and other wheat/maida based breads like naan, roti parathas are often stuffed with vegetarian items to make it a satisfying meal. Many Indian dishes also qualify as vegan, though many others use honey or dairy.
  - South Indian foods like sambar, rasam, koottu, karembadu, upma, palya or taalimpu, kozhambu or koora, aviyal, olan, Kadala curry, Theeyal, pulihora or puliyogare, Chammandi, Chutney, Chitranna, Bisi Bele Bath, and breads like Appam, Puttu, pathiri, dosa, idli and vada.

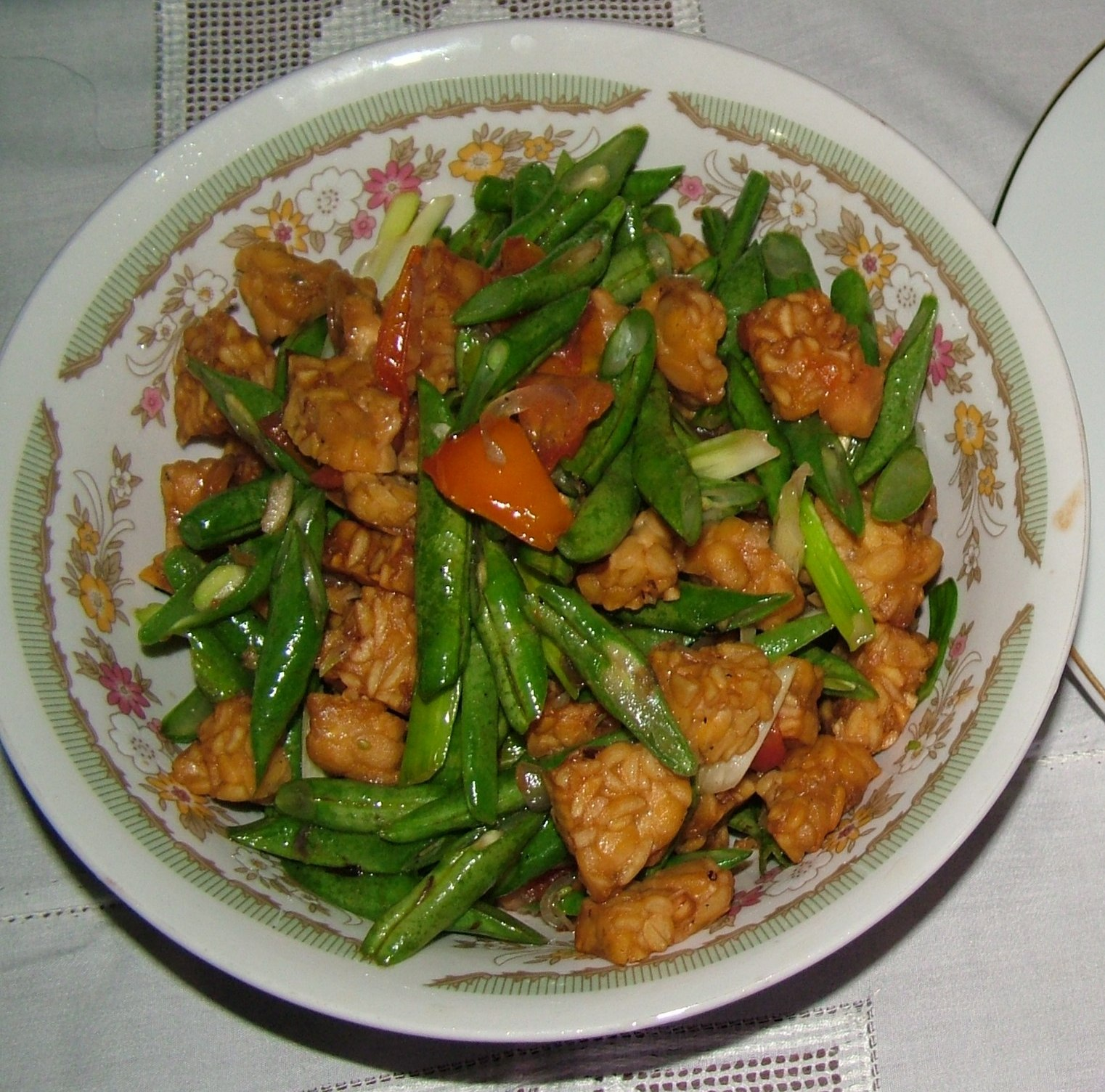
Sautéed tempeh with green beans, an Indonesian dish

- In Indonesia, vegetarianism is well served and represented, as there are plenty selection of vegetarian dishes and meat substitutes. Dishes such as gado-gado, karedok, ketoprak, pecel, urap, rujak and asinan are vegetarian. However, dishes that use peanut sauce, such as gado-gado, karedok or ketoprak, might contain a small amount of shrimp paste for flavor. Served solely, gudeg can be considered a vegetarian food, since it consists of unripe jackfruit and coconut milk. Fermented soy products, such as tempeh, tofu and oncom are prevalent as meat substitutes, as the source of protein. Most of Indonesians do not practice strict vegetarianism and only consume vegetables or vegetarian dishes for their taste, preference, economic and health reasons. Nevertheless, there are small numbers of Indonesian Buddhists who practice vegetarianism for religious reason.
- For Vietnamese cuisine, vegetarian foods are called đồ ăn chay. Numerous dishes can be made vegetarian by affixing the label chay at the end of the dish's names. Phở chay, hủ tiếu chay, mì chay, cơm tấm chay, bánh mì chay and so forth. Đậu phụ, in addition to rau cải xanh and giá đậu nành, serve as ingredients commonly found in vegetarian Vietnamese cuisine. Bánh xèo, bánh hỏi and bánh ướt are typically vegetarian dishes which could be served with nước tương instead of nước mắm chấm, although there is a vegetarian variant for this dipping sauce just as well.
- Japanese foods such as castella, dorayaki, edamame, name kojiru, mochi, taiyaki, tempura, vegetable sushi and wagashi. Miso soup is made from fermented white or red soy bean paste, garnished with scallions or seaweed. Although most traditional versions are made from fish stock (dashi), it can be made with vegetable stock as well.
- Korean cuisine has some dishes that are often vegetarian. One example is bibimbap, which is rice with mixed vegetables. Sometimes this dish contains beef or other non-vegetarian ingredients. Another Korean food which is sometimes vegetarian is jeon, in which ingredients (most commonly vegetables and/or seafood) are coated in a flour and egg batter and then pan-fried in oil.

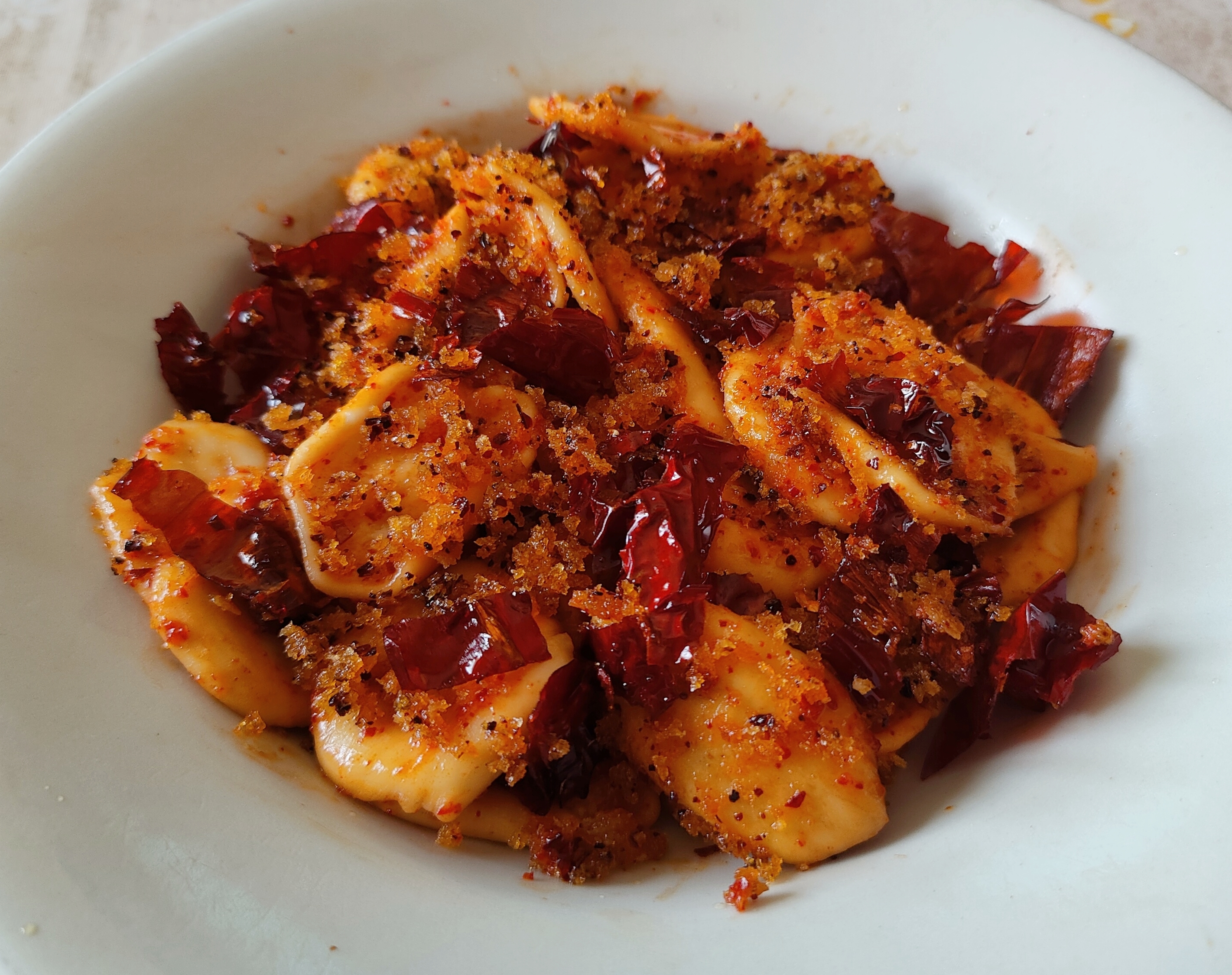
Pasta con i peperoni cruschi, a vegetarian/vegan dish from Italy.

- Cuisine of the Mediterranean such as tumbet and many polentas and tapas dishes.
- Mexican foods such as salsa and guacamole with chips, rice and bean burritos (without lard in the refried beans or chicken fat in the rice), huevos rancheros, veggie burrito, many quesadillas, bean tacos, some chilaquiles and bean-pies, chili sin carne, black beans with rice, some chiles rellenos, cheese enchiladas and vegetable fajitas.
- Italian foods such as most pastas, many pizzas, bruschetta, caponata, crostini, eggplant parmigiana, Polenta and many risottos.
- Continental cuisine such as braised leeks with olives and parsley, ratatouille, many quiches, sauteed Brussels sprouts with mushrooms, sauteed Swiss chard, squash and vegetable-stuffed mushrooms.
- In Germany, Frankfurt green sauce, Klöße with vegetarian sauces (e.g., Chanterelle), cheese or vegetable stuffed Maultaschen, combinations of quark, spinach, potatoes and herbs provide some traditional vegetarian summer dishes. Traditionally on Fridays, southern Germany broad variety of sweet dishes may be served as a main course, such as Germknödel and Dampfnudel. Potato soup and plum cake are traditional Friday dishes in the Palatinate. Brenntar in Swabia, it is made of roasted flour, usually spelt flour or oat flour.
- Many Greek and Balkan dishes, such as briam, dolmas (when made without minced meat), fasolada, gemista, vegetable based moussaka and spanakopita.

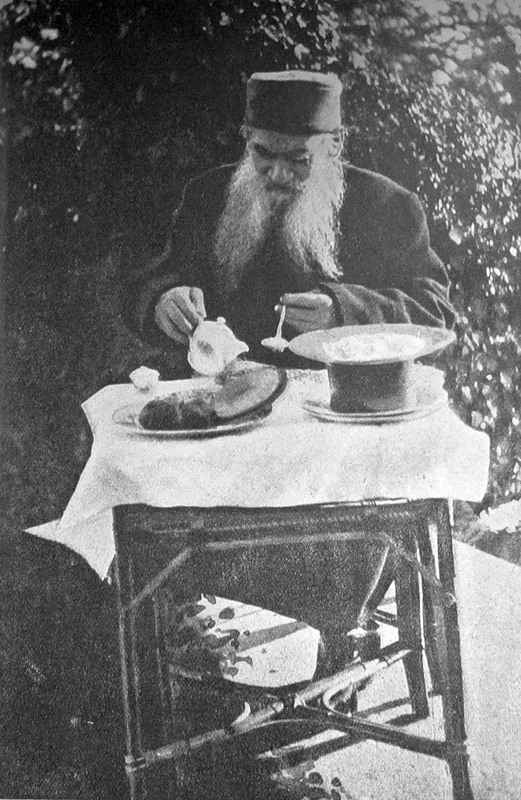
Tolstoy's vegetarian breakfast

- Russian cuisine developed a significant vegetarian tradition in czarist time, based on the example of Leo Tolstoy. The orthodox tradition of separating meat and vegetables and as well between specific meals for fasting and other holidays contributed to a rich variety of vegetarian dishes in Russia and Slavic countries, such as soups (vegetable borscht, shchi, okroshka), pirogi, blini, vareniki, kasha, buckwheat, fermented and pickled vegetables, etc.
- Many Ethiopian dishes, such as injeera or Ethiopian vegetable sauces or chillies.
- Mideastern food such as falafel, hummus (mashed chick peas), tahini (ground sesame seeds), minted-yogurts, and couscous.
  - Egyptian cuisine in particular is rich in vegetarian foods. For reasons ranging from economics to the religious practices of the Coptic Orthodox Church, most Egyptian dishes rely on beans and vegetables: the national dishes, kushari and ful medames, are entirely vegetarian, as are usually the assorted vegetable casseroles that characterize the typical Egyptian meal.
- Many dishes in Thai cuisine can be made vegetarian if the main protein element is substituted by a vegetarian alternative such as tofu. This includes dishes such as phat khi mao and, if a vegetarian shrimp paste and fish sauce substitute is used, many Thai curries. Venues serving vegetarian Buddhist cuisine (ahan che; Thai: อาหารเจ) can be found all over Thailand.
- Creole and Southern foods such as hush puppies, okra patties, rice and beans, or sauteed kale or collards, if not cooked with the traditional pork fat or meat stock.
- Turkish cuisine has several vegetarian dishes, including İmam Bayıldı (olive oil-braised stuffed eggplant), Mercimek Köftesi (spiced red lentil balls), Mücver (zucchini fritters), and cheese-filled Gözleme (hand-rolled flatbread). Other popular vegetarian specialties include Kısır (bulgur salad with herbs and pomegranate molasses), Yaprak Sarma (grape leaves stuffed with herbed rice), Şakşuka (fried vegetables with tomato sauce), Barbunya Pilaki (borlotti beans braised in olive oil), and Mercimek Çorbası (red lentil soup). Turkish cuisine also has an entire category called Zeytinyağlılar ("olive oil dishes"), consisting of vegetables such as green beans, artichokes, leeks, eggplant, and stuffed peppers cooked in olive oil and typically served at room temperature.
- Some Welsh recipes, including Glamorgan sausages, laverbread and Welsh rarebit.

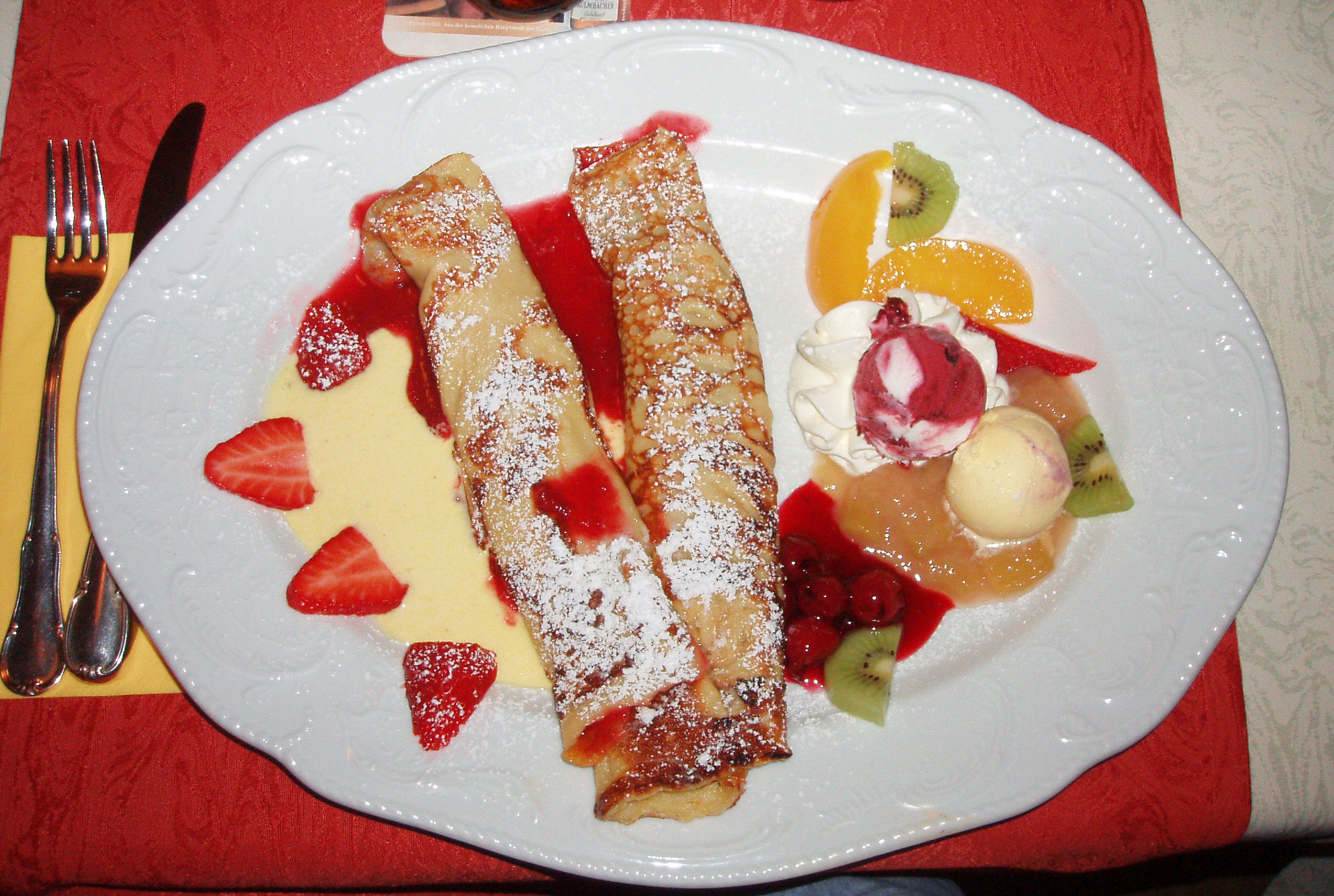
Palatschinken with ice cream, fruits and fruit compote from Austria

=== Desserts and sweets ===
Most desserts, including pies, cobblers, cakes, brownies, cookies, truffles, Rice Krispie treats (from gelatin-free marshmallows or marshmallow fluff), peanut butter treats, pudding, rice pudding, ice cream, crème brulée, etc., are free of meat and fish and are suitable for ovo-lacto vegetarians. Eastern confectionery and desserts, such as halva and Turkish delight, are mostly vegan, while others such as baklava (which often contains butter) are lacto vegetarian. Indian desserts and sweets are mostly vegetarian like peda, barfi, gulab jamun, shrikhand, basundi, kaju katri, rasgulla, cham cham, rajbhog, etc. Indian sweets are mostly made from milk products and are thus lacto vegetarian; dry fruit-based sweets are vegan.

== Meat alternatives ==
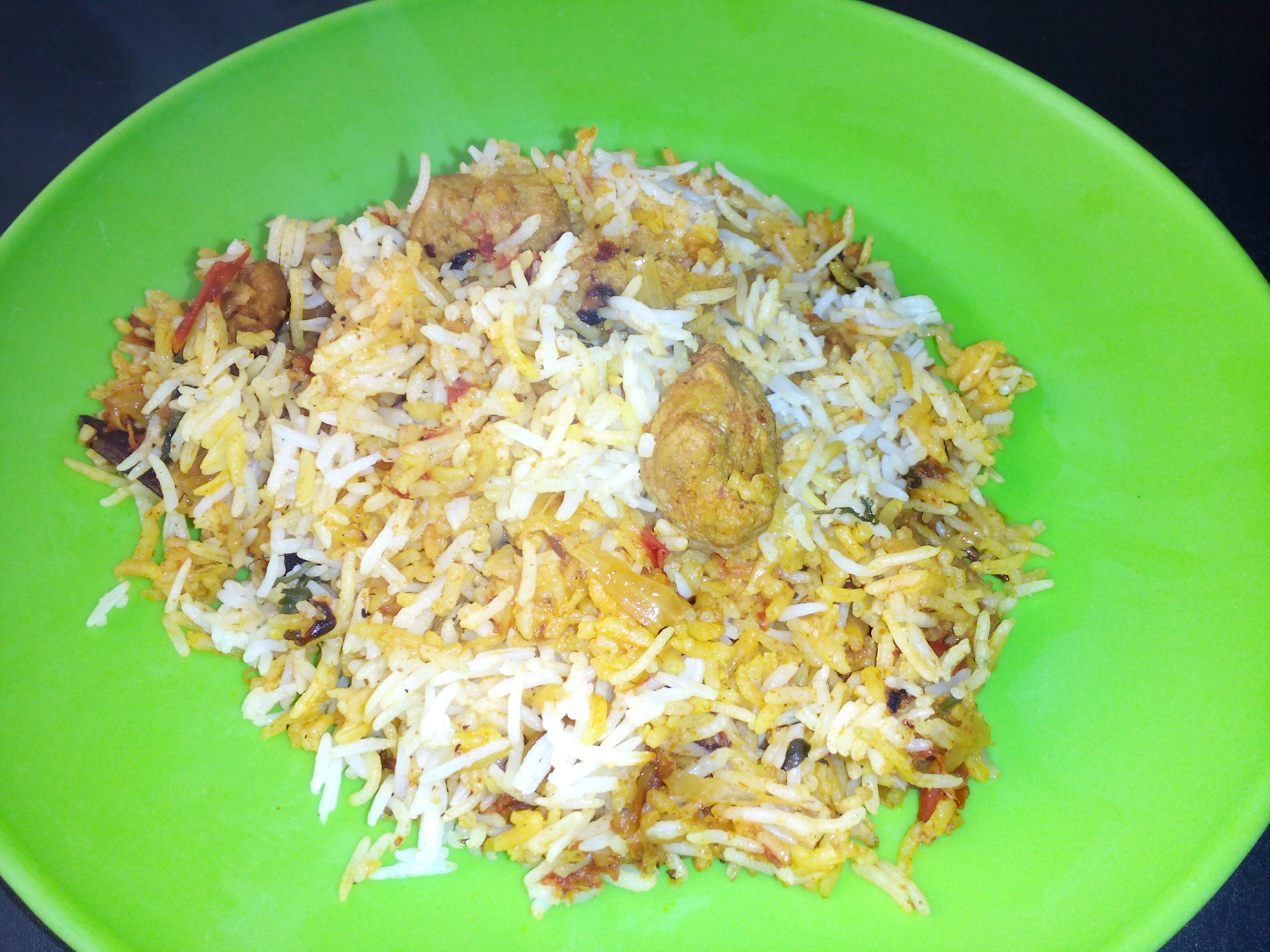
Pilaf with soya nuggets

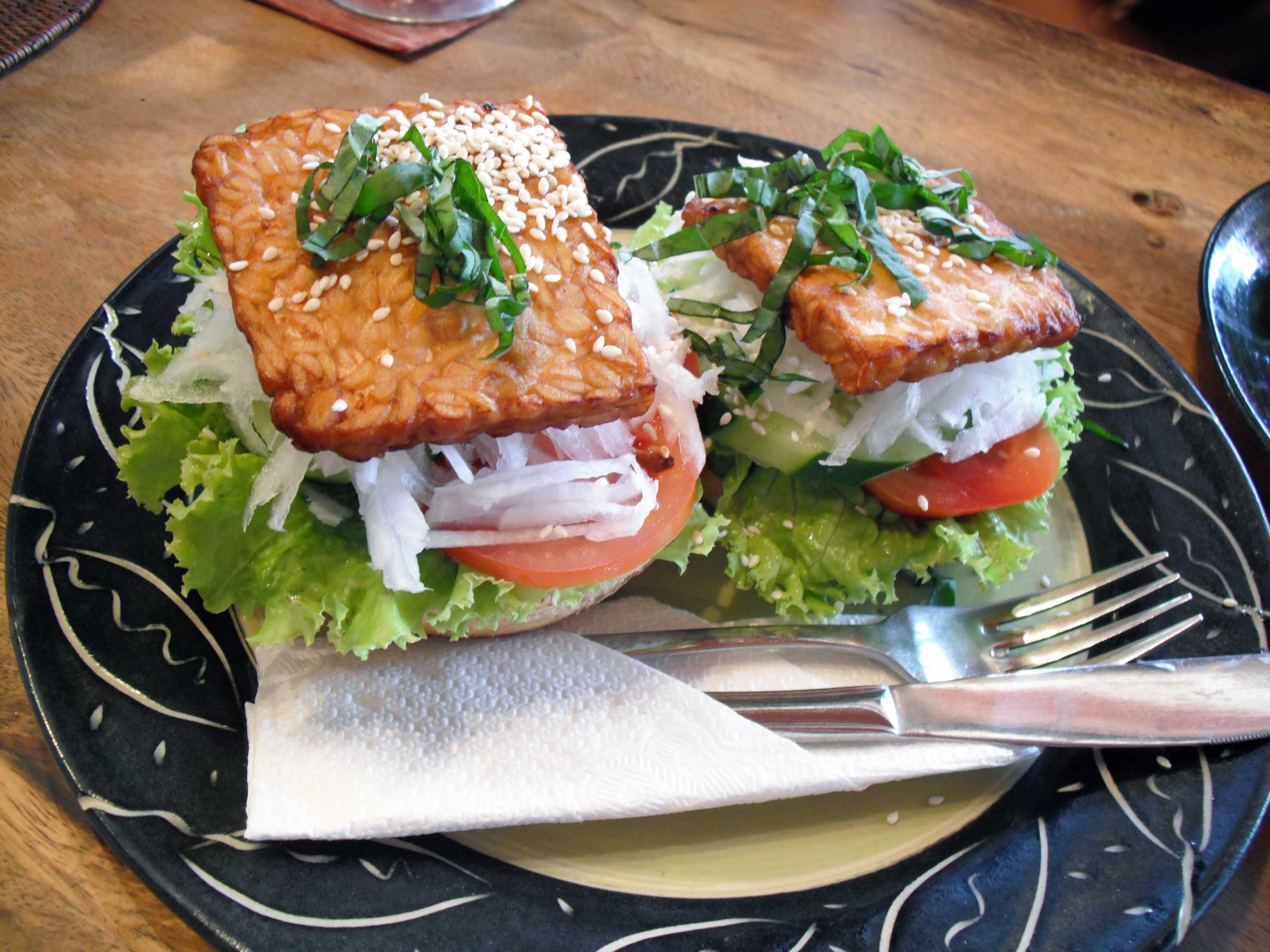
A tempeh burger

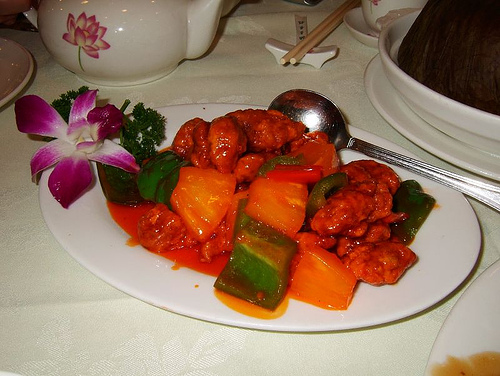
Chinese style tofu from Buddhist cuisine is prepared as an alternative to meat.

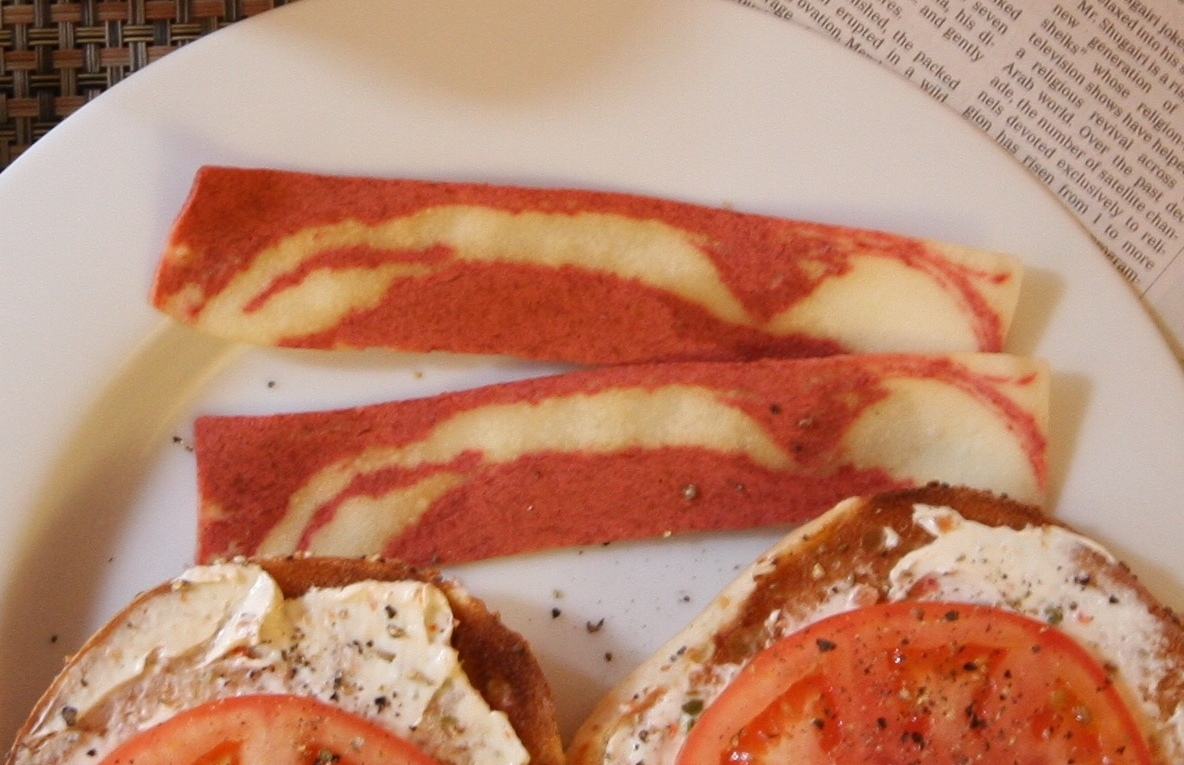
Two slices of vegetarian bacon

A meat alternative or meat substitute, also referred to as a plant-based meat, mock meat, or alternative protein, is a food product that is made from vegetarian or vegan ingredients and is consumed as a replacement for meat. The objective of meat alternatives is to replicate the qualities of meat, including its mouthfeel, flavor, appearance and nutritional values . Plant- and fungus-based substitutes are frequently made with soy (e.g., tofu, tempeh, and textured vegetable protein), but may also be made from wheat gluten as in seitan, pea protein as in the Beyond Burger, or mycoprotein as in Quorn. Alternative protein foods can also be made by precision fermentation, where single cell organisms such as yeast produce specific proteins using a carbon source; or can be grown by culturing animal cells outside an animal, based on tissue engineering techniques. The ingredients of meat alternatives include 50–80% water, 10–25% textured vegetable proteins, 4–20% non-textured proteins, 0–15% fat and oil, 3-10% flavors/spices, 1–5% binding agents, and 0–0.5% coloring agents.

Meatless tissue engineering involves the cultivation of stem cells on natural or synthetic scaffolds to create meat-like products. Scaffolds can be made from various materials, including plant-derived biomaterials, synthetic polymers, animal-based proteins, and self-assembling polypeptides. It is these 3D scaffold-based methods that provide a specialized structural environment for cellular growth. Alternatively, scaffold-free methods promote cell aggregation, allowing cells to self-organize into tissue-like structures.

Meat alternatives are typically consumed as a source of dietary protein by vegetarians, vegans, and people following religious and cultural dietary laws; however, global demand for sustainable diets has also increased their popularity among non-vegetarians and flexitarians seeking to reduce the environmental impact of animal agriculture. Meat substitution has a long history. Tofu was invented in China as early as 200 BCE, and in the Middle Ages, chopped nuts and grapes were used as a substitute for mincemeat during Lent. Since the 2010s, startup companies such as Impossible Foods and Beyond Meat have popularized pre-made plant-based substitutes for ground beef, burger patties, and chicken nuggets as commercial products.

== Commercial products ==
Labeling used in India to distinguish vegetarian products (left) from non-vegetarian products (right).

Commercial products marketed towards vegetarians are available in most countries, though their quantity and variety can vary. In India, packaged foods are required to identify vegetarian and non-vegetarian products using standardized symbols and color codes. Vegetarian foods use a green symbol, while non-vegetarian foods use a brown symbol.

Commercial plant-based foods, many of which are suitable for vegetarians or vegans, have developed into a substantial consumer market. In the United States, retail sales of plant-based foods totaled approximately $7.9 billion in 2025. Plant-based milk was the largest category, accounting for about $2.7 billion in sales, while plant-based meat and seafood accounted for about $1.0 billion.

== Health research ==
Vegetarian diets are under preliminary research for their possible effects on long-term health. Dietary patterns were evaluated along with their relationship with metabolic risk factors and metabolic syndrome. A cross-sectional analysis of 773 subjects including 35% vegetarians, 16% semi-vegetarians, and 49% non-vegetarians found that a vegetarian dietary pattern is associated significantly with lower means for all metabolic risk factors except HDL, and a lower risk of metabolic syndromes when compared to non-vegetarian diets. Metabolic risk factors include HDL, triglycerides, glucose, systolic blood pressure, diastolic blood pressure, waist circumference, and body mass index. Adventist Study 2 (AHS-2) compared mean consumption of each food group for vegetarian patterns compared to non-vegetarian patterns.

== See also ==
- Indian vegetarian cuisine
- Chinese Buddhist cuisine
- Korean vegetarian cuisine
- Veganism
- List of meat substitutes
- List of vegetable dishes
- List of vegetarian and vegan restaurants
- List of vegetarian and vegan companies
- South Asian Veggie Table – Vegetarian cooking television show
- Vegetarian Cooking for Everyone
- Vegetarian and vegan symbolism
