= Pkaila =

Tunisian Jewish dish

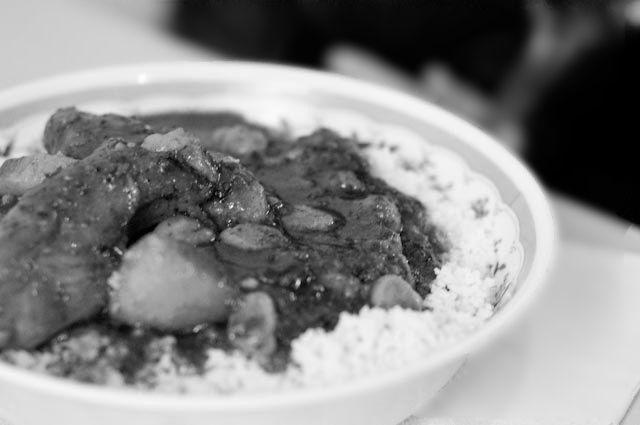
- Alternative names: Bkaila, bkeila, pkeila
- Type: Vegetable dish, stew, or condiment
- Region or state: North Africa
- Created by: Tunisian Jews
- Serving temperature: Hot
- Main ingredients: Spinach, beans, olive oil, spices, salt, garlic, couscous

Pkaïla, also called bkaïla, bkeila, or pkela, is a Tunisian Jewish dish or condiment. It is one of the local variants of hamin, made from beans and spinach, as the name suggests. Pkaïla is often prepared for the holidays, accompanied by couscous or eaten alone.

== See also ==
- Ros bratel
