= Fasolada =

Mediterranean kind of soup

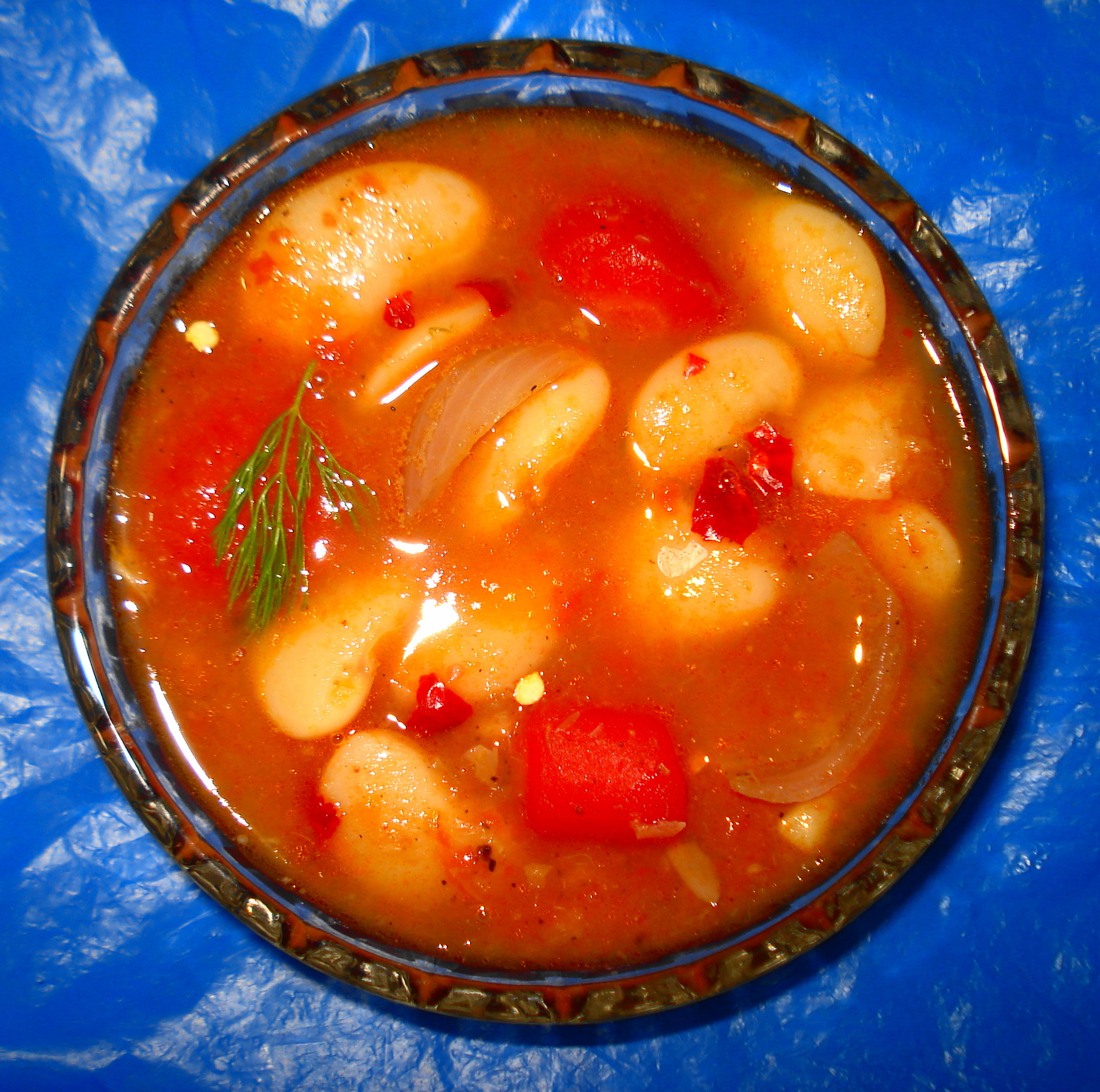
- Alternative names: Fasoulada, fasoulia
- Type: Soup
- Region or state: Greece, Cyprus
- Main ingredients: Dry white beans, olive oil, vegetables and herbs

Fasolada (Greek: φασολάδα) or fasoulada (Greek: φασουλάδα) is a Greek and Cypriot soup of dry white beans, olive oil, and vegetables. It is sometimes referred to as the "national food of the Greeks".

Fasolada is made by simmering beans with tomatoes and other vegetables such as carrots, onion, parsley, thyme, celery, and bay leaf. Lima beans are sometimes used instead of white beans. Recipes vary considerably, often including meat and olive oil.

== History ==
Its counterparts are Italian fagiolata, the Portuguese and Brazilian feijoada, Bosnian grah, Romanian fasole, Albanian fasule, and Spanish fabada. A similar dish in Turkish cuisine is called kuru fasulye. The Arabic version is called fasoulia (Arabic: فاصوليا) and is found in Egypt, Ethiopia, Iraq, Kurdistan, Jordan, Lebanon, Libya, Palestine, Saudi Arabia, Sudan, Syria, and Yemen.

== See also ==
- Gigandes plaki
- Arab cuisine
- Greek cuisine
- List of bean soups
- List of legume dishes
- List of soups
