= Ros bratel =

Traditional Algerian Jewish tagine dish

Ros Bratel
- Type: Vegetable dish, tagine
- Course: Main
- Place of origin: Originally: Algeria; Today: Israel & France
- Created by: Algerian
- Serving temperature: Hot
- Main ingredients: Fava beans, spices, coriander, olive oil, salt, couscous

Ros bratel is a traditional Algerian tagine dish made with fresh fava beans, olive oil, and spices such as coriander. It is paired with couscous, and is commonly served on Shabbat, and today is popular among the Israeli and French Jewish communities.

== Origin ==
Ros bratel originated several thousand years ago among members of the Algerian Jewish community who resided in Constantine, Algeria until their expulsion in the 1960s.

== See also ==
- Hamin
- Sephardi cuisine
- Kuru fasulye
