= Ladera =

Ottoman vegetable dishes with olive oil

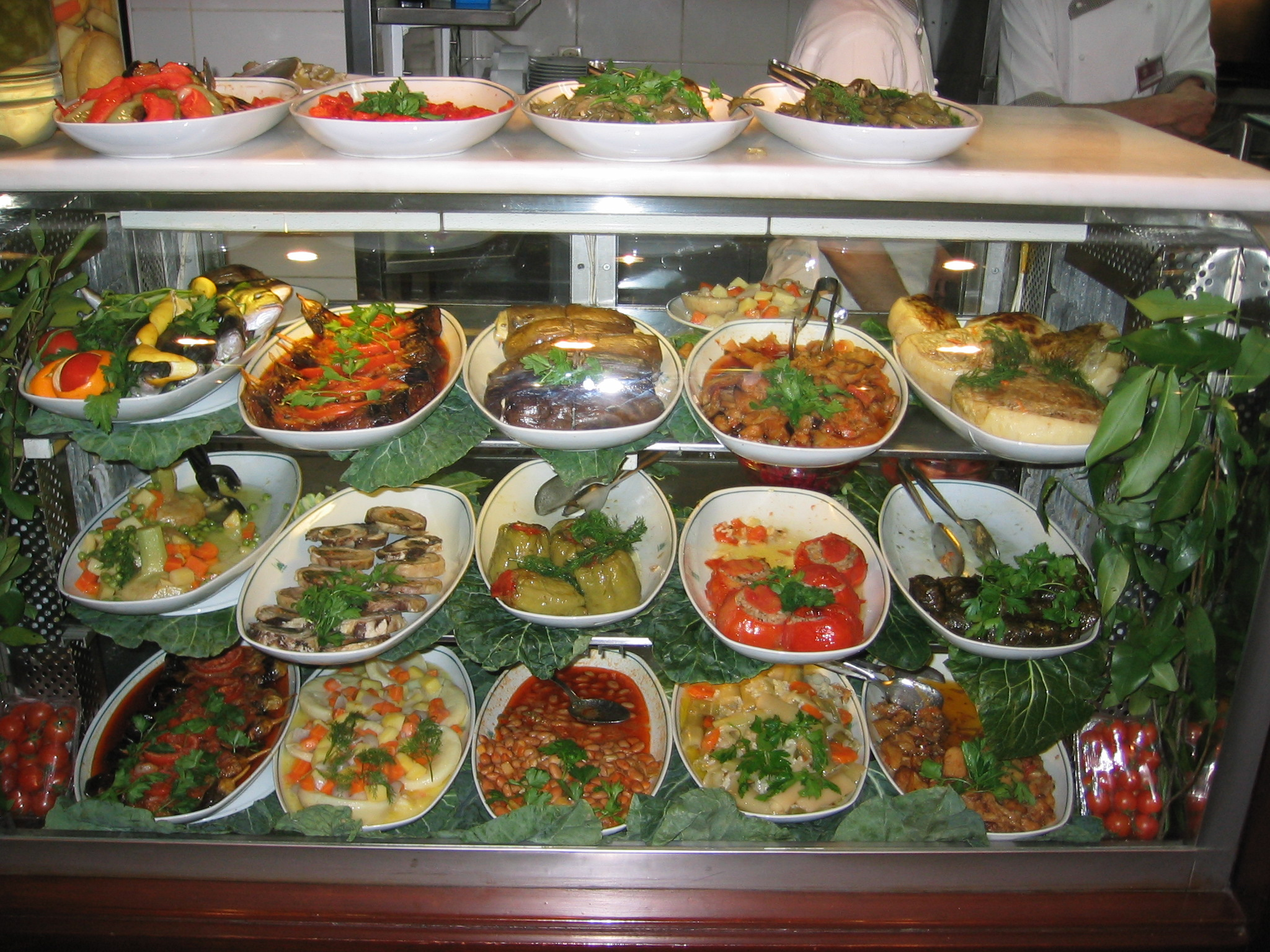
Assortment of Turkish 'zeytinyağlı'

Ladera (Greek λαδερά), zeytinyağlı (yemekler) (Turkish), or bil zayt (Arabic بالزيت) is a category of vegetable dishes cooked in olive oil in Greek, Turkish, and Arabic cuisines. The name in all these languages means "with (olive) oil".

Ladera consists of vegetables, plain or stuffed, cooked in a tomato, onion, garlic, and olive oil sauce, and usually do not contain meat. Formerly, lemon juice was used when tomatoes were out of season.

They may be stewed on the range-top or baked in the oven.

Ladera can be served on their own, typically with feta cheese and bread, or with potatoes, bulgur, or pasta. They may also be served as a side dish to fish or meat.

They are often served warm or at room temperature, and are popular in the summer. They are also commonly eaten as a fasting food.

Examples include:

- Vegetables including green beans, zucchini, okra, leeks, and eggplant
- With lemon, peas, artichokes, fava, carrots, and zucchini
- A mixture of vegetables, called tourlou (Greek), türlü (Turkish), or briam.
- İmam bayıldı
- Many kinds of leaves rolled around fillings (sarma)
- Many kinds of stuffed vegetables (dolma)

== See also ==
- Yahni
- Plaki
