= Piyaz =

Turkish and Persian cuisine

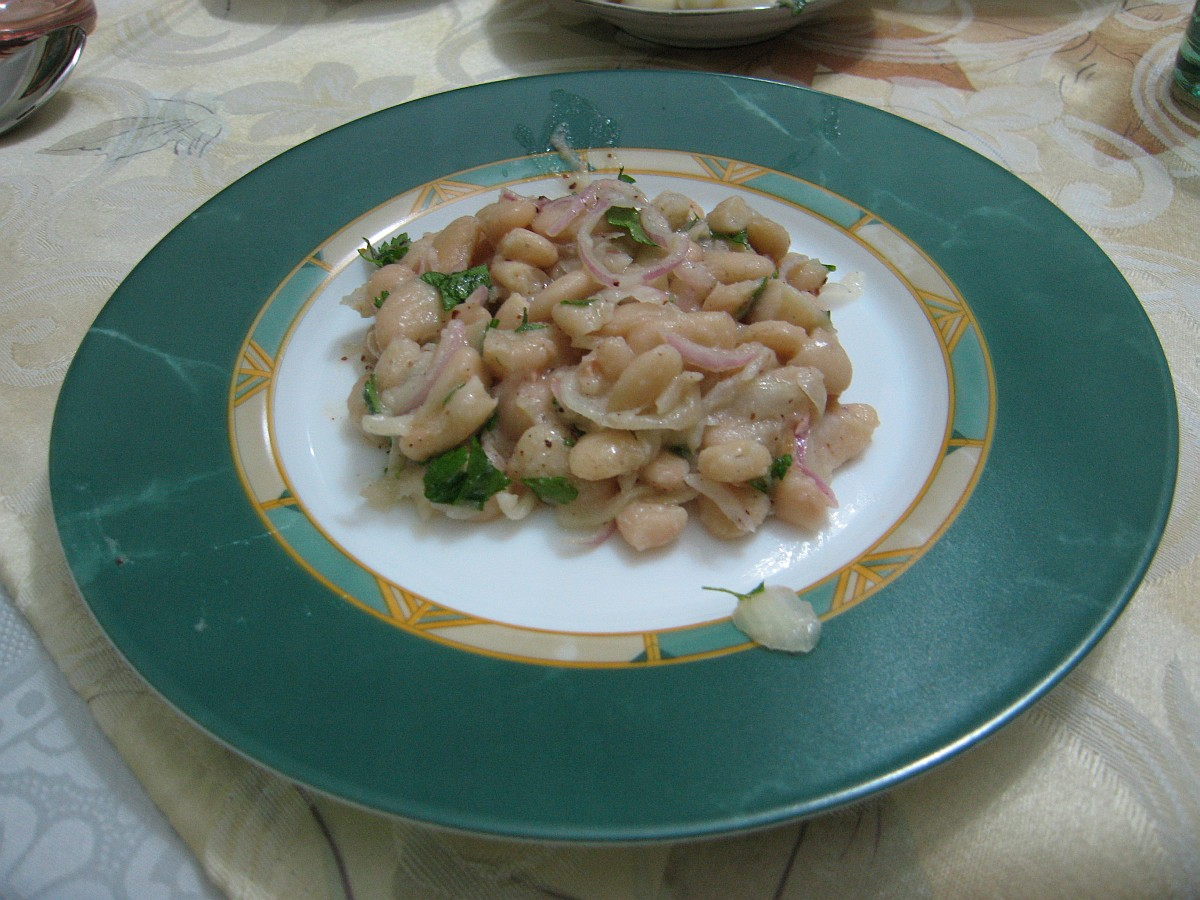
- Type: Salad
- Place of origin: Iraq, Iran, Turkey
- Main ingredients: Boiled beans, vegetables

Piyaz (Turkish: piyaz, Persian: پیاز, Kurdish: pivaz, piyaz for "onion" or salad) is a bean salad or meze in Turkish cuisine and Persian cuisine that is made from any kind of boiled beans with raw onion, parsley and sumac. Optionally, a boiled egg can be added to this dish.

The name of "piyaz" derives from old Iranian word of "pidāz" for onion, later on this name was adopted for salads or mezes made with onion.

In Antalya province of Turkey it is prepared differently from other regions with other ingredients such as tarator sauce based on tahini (crushed sesame seeds). In Antalya, piyaz is not considered a salad but a main dish.

There are also versions of piyaz made of other beans. Mung beans piyaz (maş piyazı) is famous in Gaziantep and, like Antalya piyaz, is registered with the Turkish Patent and Trademark Office. It is made by combining boiled mung beans with onion, parsley, red pepper flakes, olive oil, salt and pomegranate syrup, topped with walnuts. It can be decorated with red pepper flakes and pomegranate seeds. Instead of pomegranate syrup, grape syrup or lemon juice can be used.

Piyaz can be also made of chickpeas (nohut piyazı) and green lentils (mercimek piyazı).

In southern provinces like Adana, the word "piyaz" is used to refer to an onion and sumac salad. During the Ottoman period, piyaz was also made from artichoke, pea, chickpea, broad bean and potato, which were introduced to Turkey in the last quarter of the 19th century.

== See also ==
- Pilaki
- Kuru fasulye
- Kurdish cuisine
- Turkish cuisine
- List of salads
