= Pilaki =

Bean dish

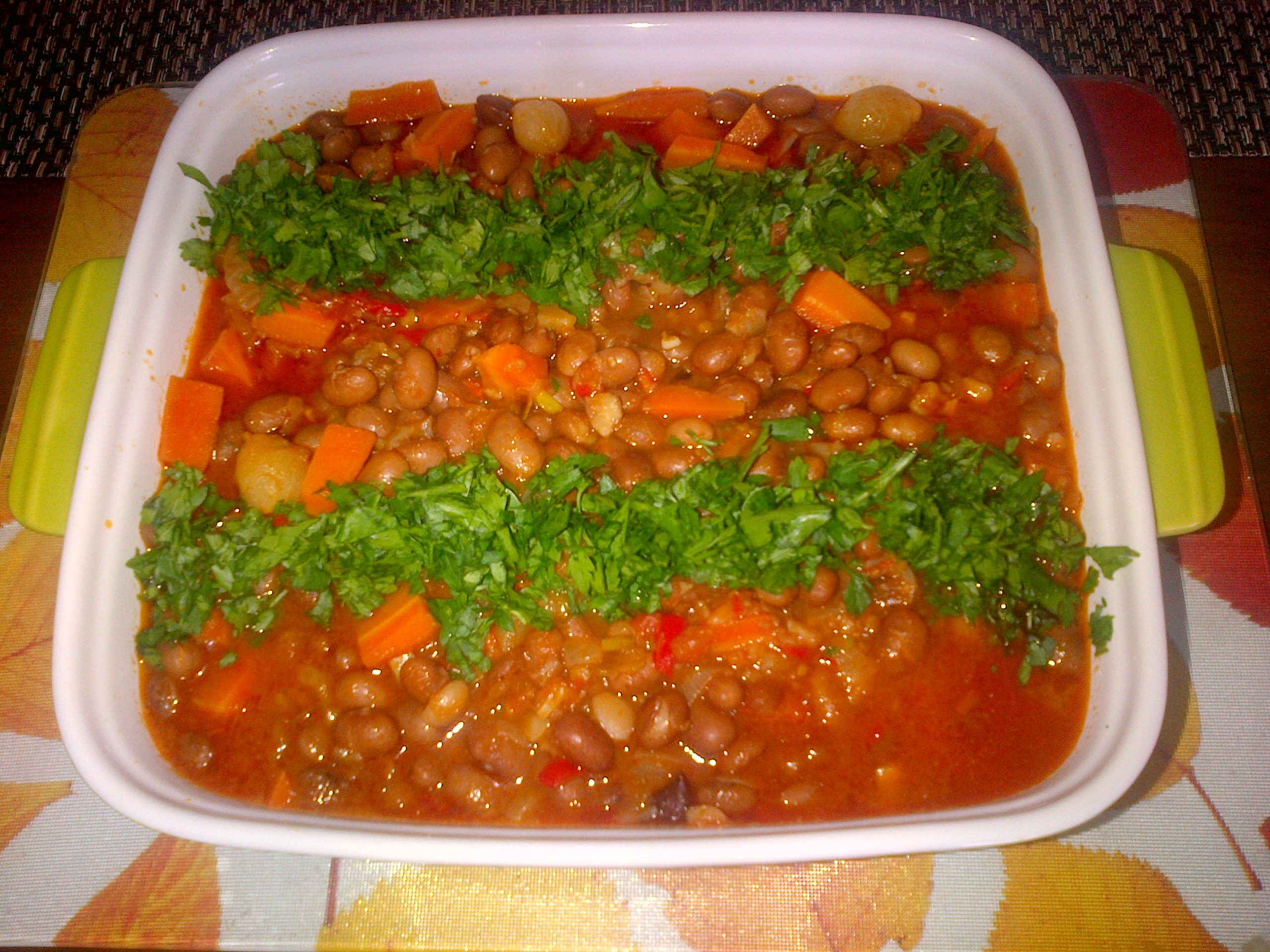
Pilaki

Pilaki is a style of meze and may refer to several dishes that are cooked in a sauce made out of onion, garlic, carrot, potato, tomato or tomato paste, sugar, and olive oil. Beans used in this style are white beans, or borlotti beans. They are served cold, garnished with parsley and slices of lemon. Fish pilaki is also a popular recipe.

== Name and origins ==
The name "pilaki" comes from the Greek word "plakion" (Greek: πλακίον), referring to a fire-resistant stone cooking vessel.

It originated in the Byzantine Empire, being used in Byzantine cuisine.

== Variants ==
In Greek cuisine, this style is known as plaki. In Bulgarian cuisine the name is "plakiya".

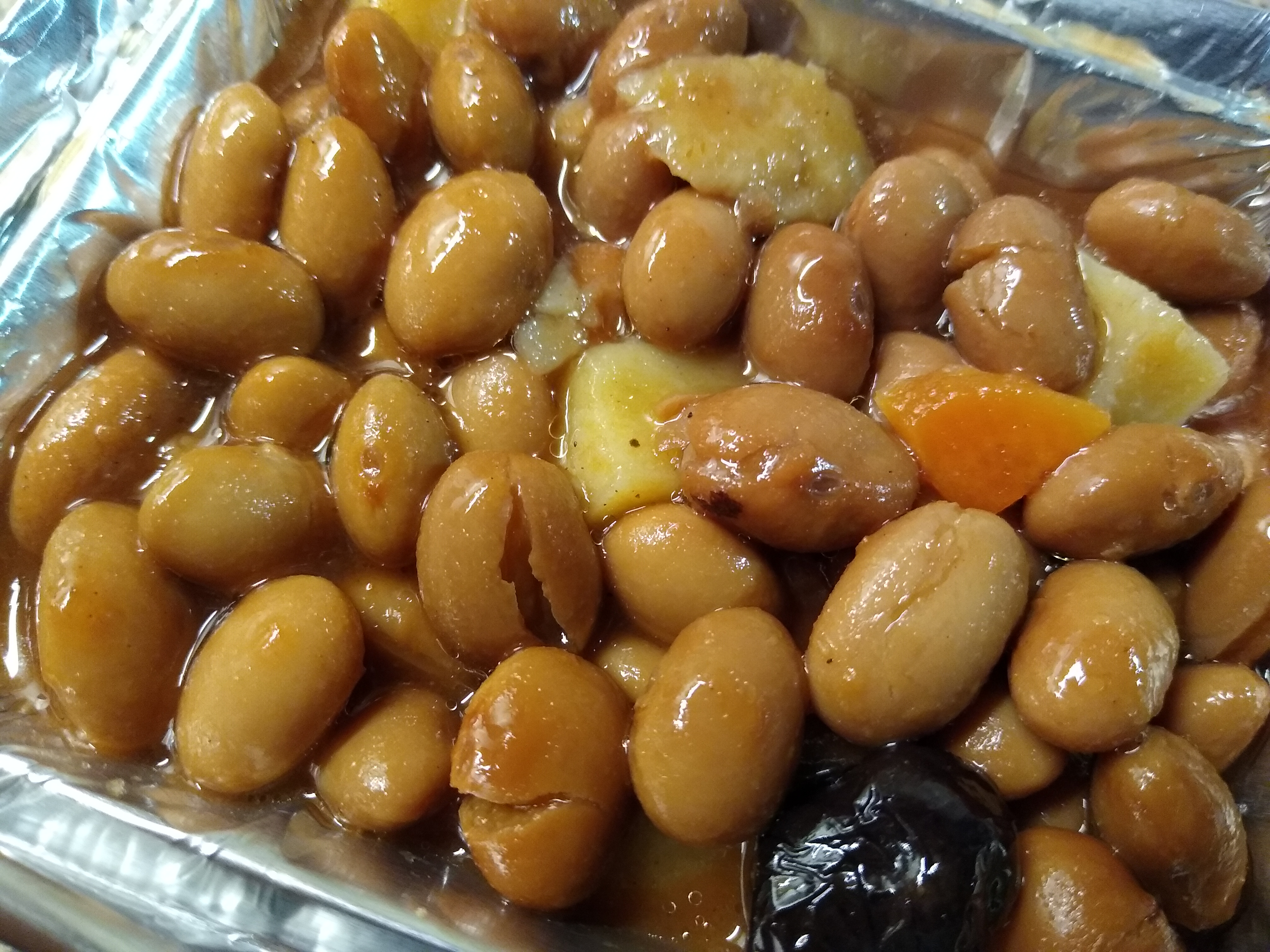
Pilaki

== See also ==
- Gigandes plaki, a similar Greek dish.
- Piyaz, another Turkish bean dish.
- Rajma, an Indian dish.
- Red beans and rice, a Louisiana Creole specialty.
