= Kuru fasulye =

Turkish bean stew

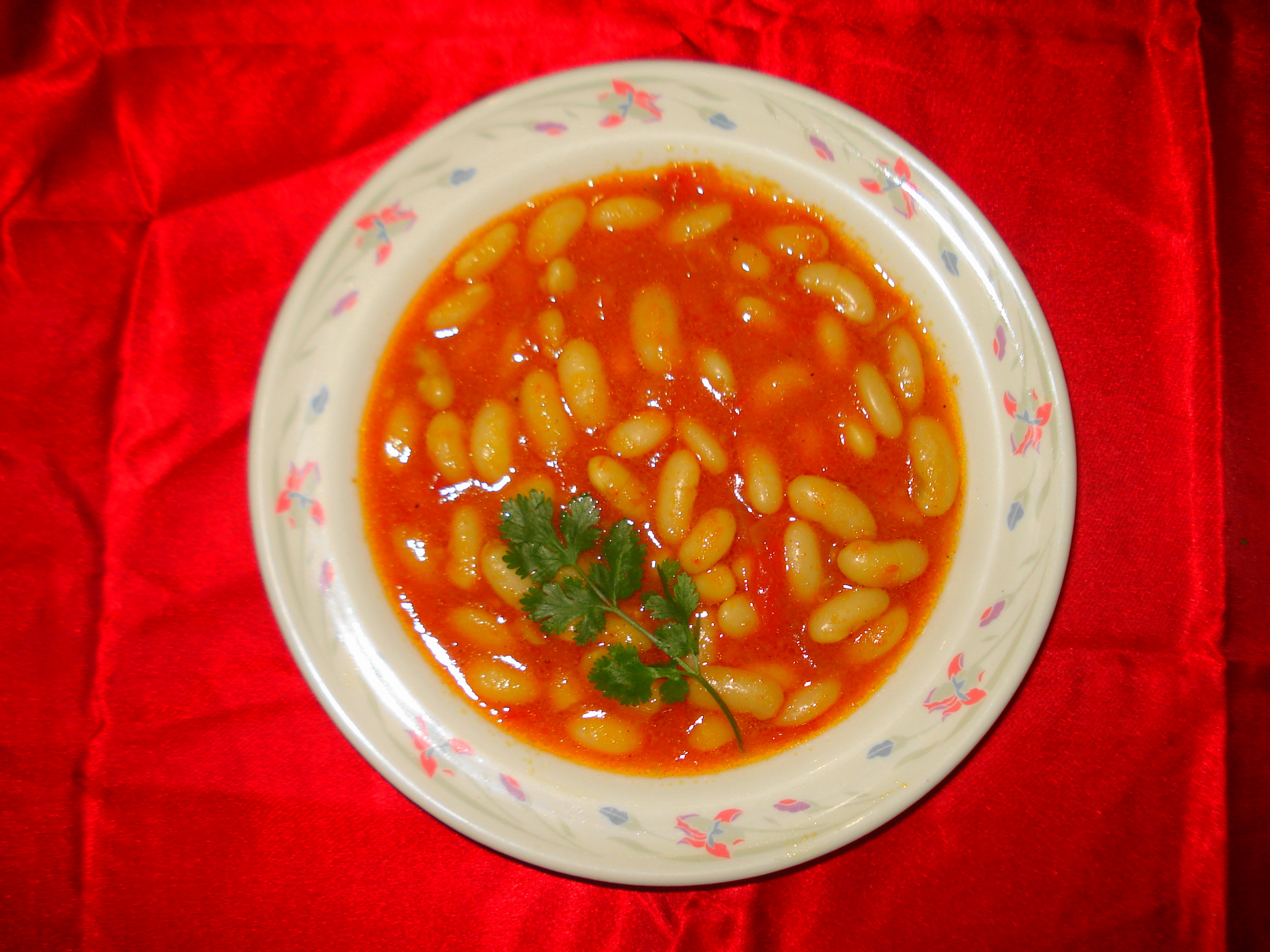
- Kuru fasulye
- Associated cuisine: Turkish cuisine
- Main ingredients: white beans and olive oil, and onion and tomato paste or tomato sauce

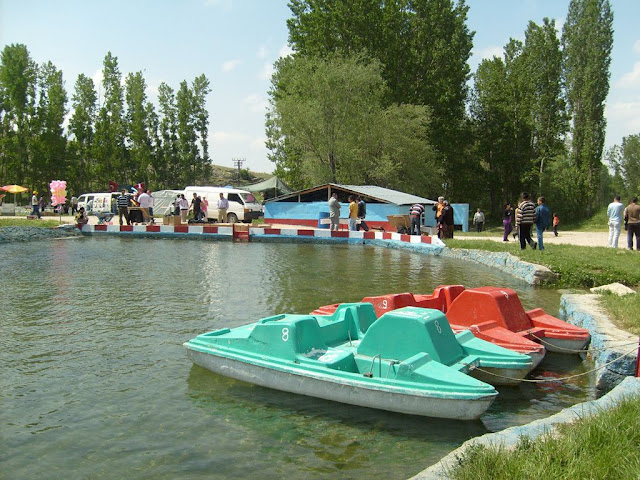
An annual kuru fasulye festival is held in Kaymaz, Sivrihisar.

Kuru fasulye is a stewed bean dish in Turkish cuisine. It is made primarily with white beans and olive oil, with onion and tomato paste or tomato sauce being used almost invariably. Sometimes other vegetables or meat may also be added, especially pastirma. Kuru fasulye is often served along with cacık and rice or bulgur. It is often considered the national dish of Turkey.

Also known as Mash Shorbasi in Azerbaijan.

== See also ==
- List of legume dishes
- Fasolada
