= Gigantes plaki =

Greek bean dish

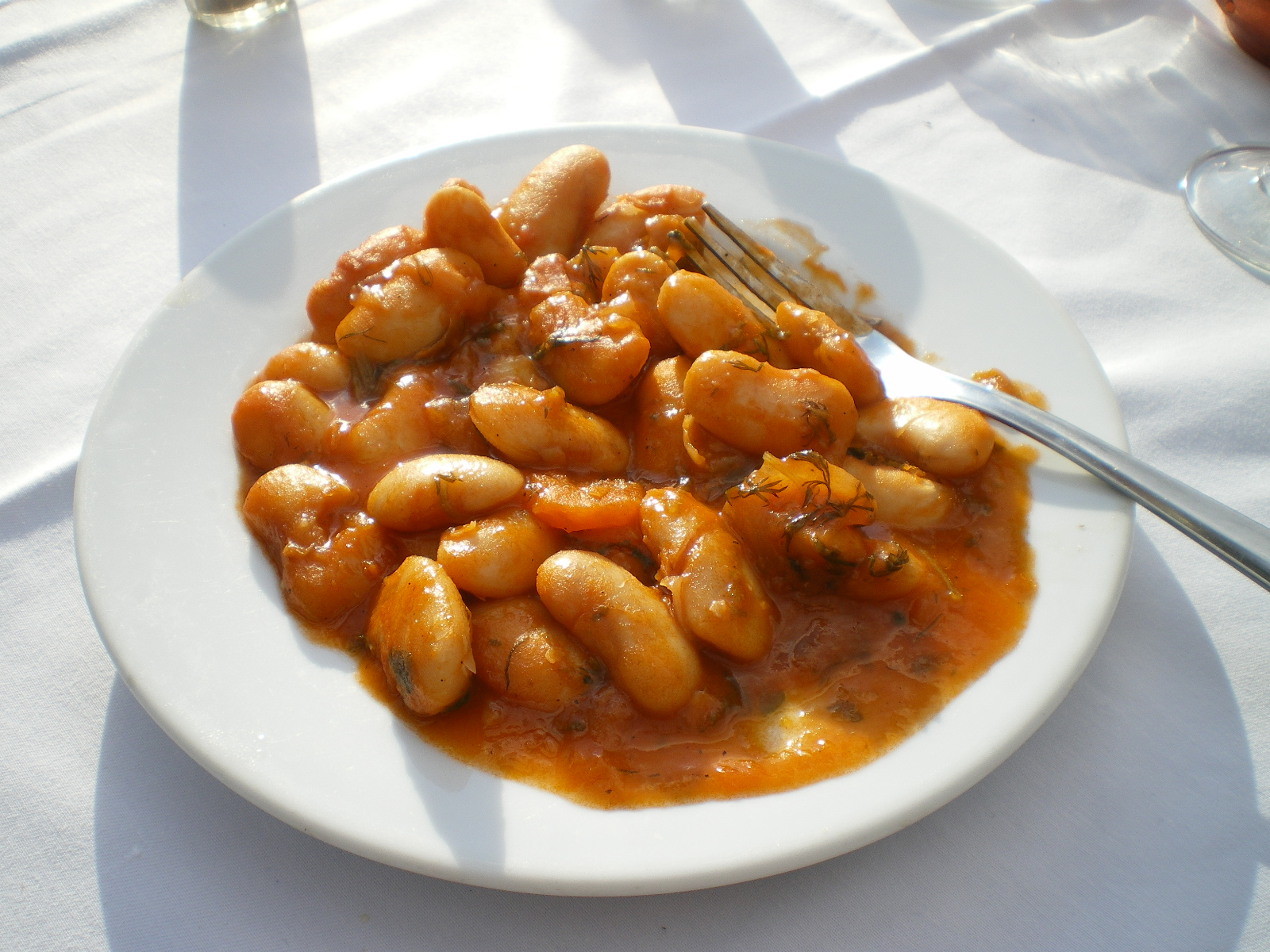
A serving of Gigantes plaki

Gigantes plaki (Greek γίγαντες πλακί pronounced [ˈʝiɣa(n)des plaˈci]) or Greek giant baked beans, is a Greek dish of large white beans baked in a tomato sauce. Gigantes plaki may be served as a main dish or as a meze. The beans are traditionally fasolia gigantes 'giant beans', a variety of Phaseolus coccineus.

As with other plaki dishes, the beans are baked with olive oil, tomatoes, vegetables, and herbs.

== Cooking methods ==
The dish is made with dried giant runner beans (called fasolia gigantes), tomatoes, onions, olive oil, parsley, and carrots. Large lima beans are sometimes substituted. Other vegetables such as garlic and celery are sometimes used. The dish is vegan and thus suitable for Orthodox Christian fast days, though sometimes sausages or cubed smoked pork are added.

The beans are soaked and boiled until tender. The aromatics are sautéed to make a sofrito and mixed with the beans. Then the beans are baked until the top layer of the dish is browned. The dish may be served at room temperature or warm.

== Serving methods ==
Gigantes plaki are often served at room temperature as part of a meze. They are also served as a main course. It is particularly popular in the autumn and winter. Gigantes are often served with feta cheese and bread.

== See also ==
- Pilaki
- Piyaz
