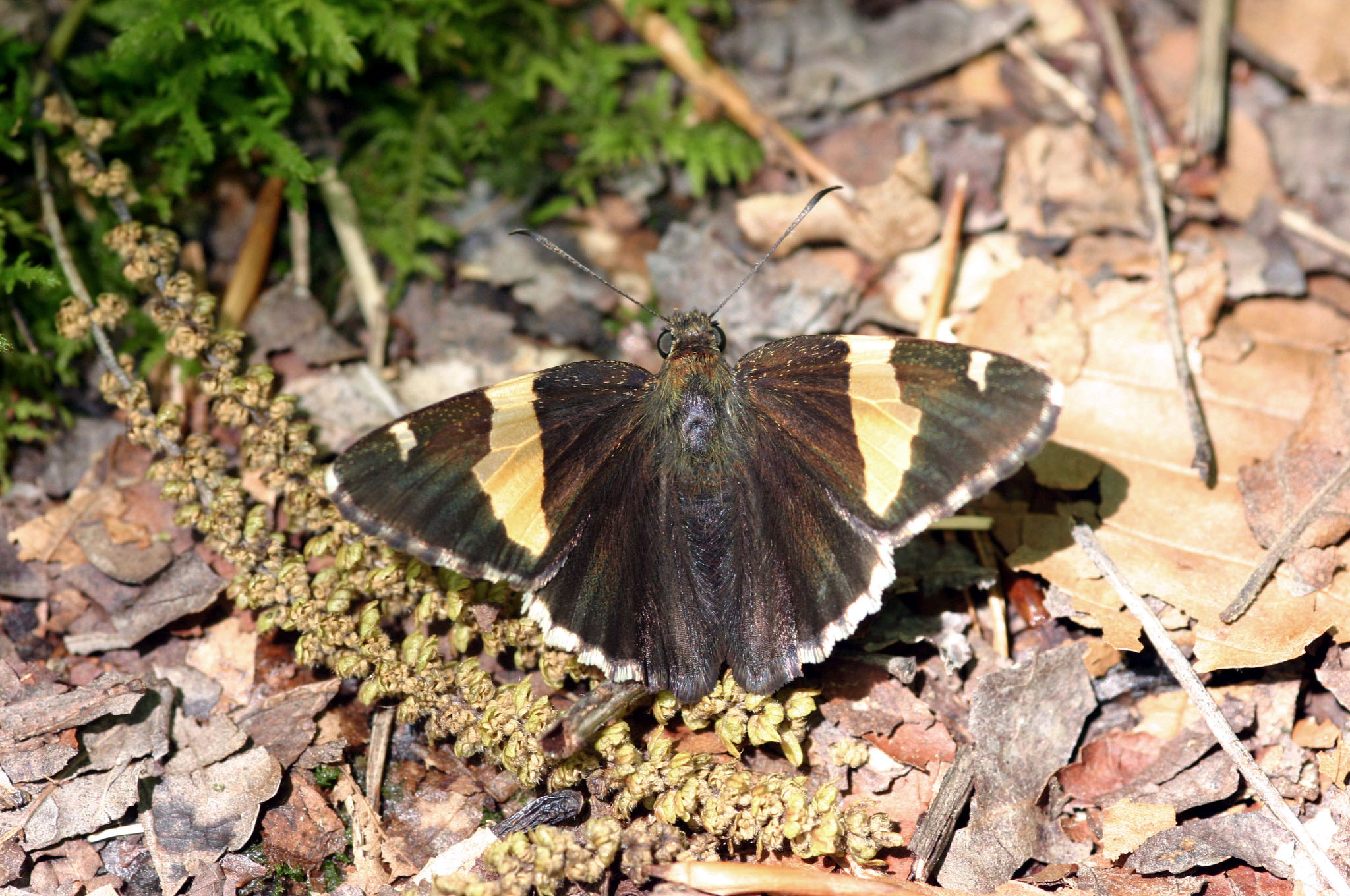

Conservation status
- Apparently Secure (NatureServe)

Scientific classification
- Domain: Eukaryota
- Kingdom: Animalia
- Phylum: Arthropoda
- Class: Insecta
- Order: Lepidoptera
- Family: Hesperiidae
- Genus: Telegonus
- Species: T. cellus

Binomial name
- Telegonus cellus (Boisduval & Le Conte, 1837)

Synonyms
- Autochton cellus (Boisduval and Le Conte, [1837])

= Telegonus cellus =

Golden banded skipper

Species of butterfly

Telegonus cellus, the golden banded-skipper, is a North and Central American species of butterfly in the family Hesperiidae. There are two populations, one in the eastern United States and the other in the southwestern United States and Mexico. The eastern population is rare and local and uses only one host plant, the thicket bean (Phaseolus polystachios). The southwestern population is uncommon to common and uses more than one host plant (see host plant list). The golden banded-skipper is most active mid-morning and late afternoon. Their flight is sluggish and low to the ground, compared to closely related species.

== Description ==
The upperside of the wings are chocolate brown with a golden median band on the forewing. The hindwing has a checkered fringe. The underside of the wings are very similar to the upperside. Its wingspan measures 32 to 44 millimetres (1.25 to 1.75 in).

== Similar species ==
The golden banded-skipper has many similar species in its range such as the Sonoran banded-skipper (Cecropterus pseudocellus), the Sierra Madre banded-skipper (Telegonus siermadror), the Chisos banded-skipper (Cecropterus cincta), the dark-fringed banded-skipper (Cecropterus vectilucis), the spiky banded-skipper (Autochton neis), the two-spotted banded-skipper (Autochton bipunctatus), the sharp banded-skipper (Cecropterus zarex), and the narrow banded-skipper (Cecropterus longipennis).

== Habitat ==
In the east, this species prefers moist, steep woodlands while in the southwest, it favors canyon riparian habitat. It appears to be declining in the east where it has lost habitat around Washington, D.C., and around West Virginia.

== Flight ==
The golden banded-skipper flies in the east from June to August, from February to September in Florida, and in the southwest, from mid-June to early September in Arizona.

== Life cycle ==
Golden banded-skippers have a strange mix of patrolling and perching in their courtship. Females lay their eggs on the underside of host plant leaves in clusters of two to nine in a row. The egg is yellow but turns tan just before hatching. The larva makes a nest out of leaves, attaching them together with silk. It comes out of its nest at night to feed. The larva is pine green with small yellow spots and has a yellow lateral stripe. The black head has two facial orange spots and a reddish collar. The pupa is dark brown with a greenish hue. It overwinters as a pupa. The golden banded-skipper has one to three broods per year.

== Host plants ==
- Thicket bean (Phaseolus polystachios) – in the east
- New Mexican locust (Robinia neomexicana) – in the southwest
- Butterfly pea (Clitoria mariana) – in the southwest
- Desert bean (Phaseolus filiformis) – in the southwest
