= Bean =

Seed of several plants in the legume family

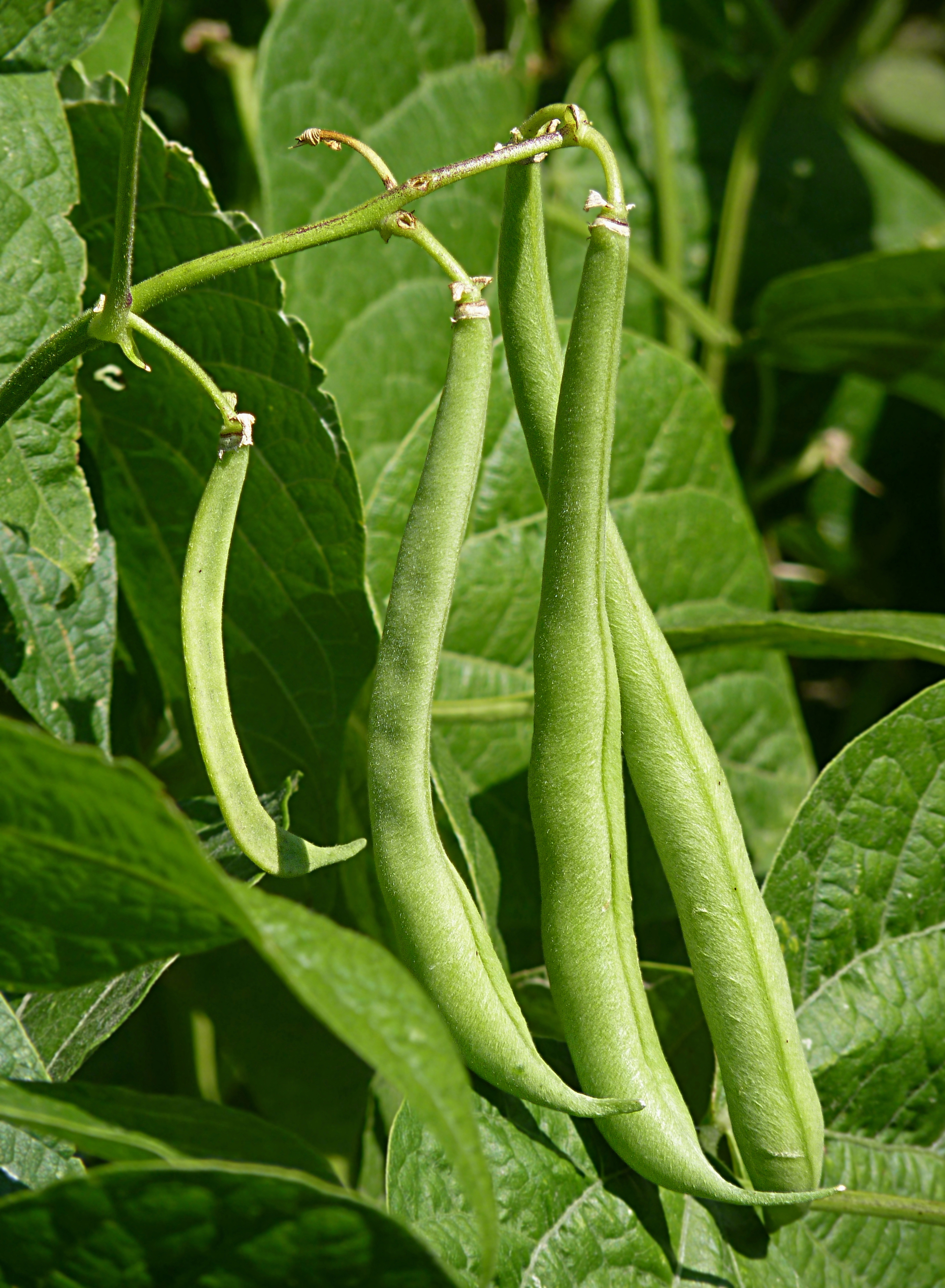
French bean pods on a plant

A bean is the seed of plants in many genera of the legume family (Fabaceae) used as a vegetable for human consumption or animal feed. The seeds are sold fresh or preserved through drying (a pulse). Beans have been cultivated since the seventh millennium BCE in Thailand, and since the second millennium BCE in Europe and in Peru. Most beans, with the exception of peas, are summer crops. As legumes, the plants fix nitrogen and form seeds with a high protein content. They are produced on a scale of millions of tons annually in many countries, with India as the largest producer.

The common bean, Phaseolus vulgaris, is the most consumed bean species in the world and is native to the Americas. It was domesticated in Mexico, Central America and the southern Andes region some 8,000years ago. It has extensive varieties.

Dried beans are traditionally soaked and boiled, and used in traditional dishes throughout the world including salads, soups, and stews such as chili con carne. Some are processed into tofu; others are fermented to form tempeh. Guar beans are used for their gum. The unripe seedpods of some varieties are also eaten whole as green beans or edamame (immature soybean). Some types are sprouted to form beansprouts.

Many fully ripened beans contain toxins like phytohaemagglutinin and require cooking to make them safe to eat. Many species contain indigestible oligosaccharides that produce flatulence. Beans have traditionally been seen as a food of the poor.

== Etymology and naming ==
The word "bean" and its Germanic cognates (e.g. German Bohne) have existed in common use in West Germanic languages since before the 12th century, referring to broad beans, chickpeas, and other pod-borne seeds. This was long before the New World genus Phaseolus was known in Europe. With the Columbian exchange of domestic plants between Europe and the Americas, use of the word was extended to pod-borne seeds of Phaseolus, such as the common bean and the runner bean, and the related genus Vigna. The term has long been applied generally to seeds of similar form, such as Old World soybeans and lupins, and to the fruits or seeds of unrelated plants such as coffee beans and vanilla beans. This article discusses only legumes.

== History ==
Beans in an early cultivated form were grown in Thailand from the early seventh millennium BCE, predating ceramics. Beans were deposited with the dead in ancient Egypt. Not until the second millennium BCE did cultivated, large-seeded broad beans appear in the Aegean region, Iberia, and transalpine Europe. In the Iliad, written in the 8th century BCE, there is a passing mention of beans and chickpeas (μελανόχροες ἢ ἐρέβινθοι) cast on the threshing floor.

Cowpeas (Vigna unguiculata), which include black eyed peas, were domesticated in sub Saharan Africa during the second millennium BCE.

The oldest-known domesticated beans in the Americas were found in Guitarrero Cave, Peru, dated to around the second millennium BCE. Genetic analyses of the common bean Phaseolus show that it originated in Mesoamerica, and subsequently spread southward.

Most of the kinds of beans commonly eaten today are part of the genus Phaseolus, which originated in the Americas. The first European to encounter them was Christopher Columbus, while exploring what may have been the Bahamas, and saw them growing in fields. Five kinds of Phaseolus beans were domesticated by pre-Columbian peoples, selecting pods that did not open and scatter their seeds when ripe: common beans (P. vulgaris) grown from Chile to the northern part of the United States; lima and sieva beans (P. lunatus); and the less widely distributed teparies (P. acutifolius), scarlet runner beans (P. coccineus), and polyanthus beans.

Pre-Columbian peoples as far north as the Atlantic seaboard grew beans in the "Three Sisters" method of companion planting. The beans were interplanted with maize and squash. Beans were cultivated across Chile in Pre-Hispanic times, likely as far south as the Chiloé Archipelago.

== Diversity ==
=== Taxonomic range ===
Beans are legumes, but from many different genera, native to different regions.

Genus	Species and common varieties	Probable home region	Distribution, climate	Notes
Phaseolus	P. vulgaris: kidney, pinto, navy (cannellini, haricot/French/pole/bush), black, Borlotti beans; P. lunatus: Lima beans; P. coccineus: runner, flat beans; P. acutifolius: tepary bean	The Americas	Tropical, subtropical, warm temperate	Some contain high levels of toxic phytohemagglutinin.
Vigna	V. radiata: mung bean; V. mungo: urad bean; V. unguiculata (Cowpeas): yardlong bean, black-eyed peas; V. aconitifolia: moth bean; V. angularis: adzuki beans	Mostly South Asia	Equatorial, pantropical, warm subtropical, hot temperate	
Cajanus	C. cajan: pigeon pea	Indian Subcontinent	Pantropical, equatorial	
Lens	L. culinaris: red, green, and Puy lentils	Near East/Levant	Temperate, subtropical, cool tropical	
Cicer	C. arietinum: garbanzo beans	Turkey/Levant/Near East	Temperate, subtropical, cool tropical	
Vicia	V. faba: broad beans; V. ervilia: bitter vetch; V. sativa: common vetch	Near East	Subtropical, temperate	Causes favism in susceptible people.
Glycine	G. max: soybean	East Asia	Hot temperate, Subtropical, cool tropical	
Macrotyloma	M. uniflorum: horsegram	South Asia	Tropical, subtropical	
Mucuna	M. pruriens: velvet bean	Tropical Asia and Africa	Tropical, warm subtropical	Contains L-DOPA, and smaller amounts of other psychoactive compounds. Can cause itching and rashes on contact.
Lupinus	L. albus: white lupin; L. mutabilis: tarwi/Andean lupin	The Mediterranean, Balkans, Levant (albus), The Andes (mutabilis)	Subtropical, temperate	Requires soaking to remove toxins.
Ceratonia	C. siliqua: carob bean	Mediterranean, Middle East	Subtropical, arid subtropical, hot temperate	
Canavalia	C. gladiata: sword bean; C. ensiformis: Jack beans	South Asia or Africa (C. gladiata), Brazil and South America (C. ensiformis)	Tropical	
Cyamopsis	C. tetragonoloba: guar bean	Africa or South Asia	Tropical, semi-arid	Source of Guar gum
Lablab	L. purpureus: hyacinth/lablab bean	South Asia, Indian Subcontinent or Africa	Tropical	
Psophocarpus	P. tetranoglobulus: winged bean	New Guinea	Tropical, equatorial	

=== Conservation of cultivars ===
The biodiversity of bean cultivars is threatened by modern plant breeding, which selects a small number of the most productive varieties. Efforts are being made to conserve the germplasm of older varieties in different countries. As of 2023, the Norwegian Svalbard Global Seed Vault holds more than 40,000 accessions of Phaseolus bean species.

== Cultivation ==
=== Agronomy ===
Many beans are summer crops that need warm temperatures to grow, with peas as an exception. Legumes are capable of nitrogen fixation and hence need less fertiliser than most plants. Maturity is typically 55–60 days from planting to harvest. As the pods mature, they turn yellow and dry up, and the beans inside change from green to their mature colour. Many beans are vines needing external support, such as "bean cages" or poles. Native Americans customarily grew them along with corn and squash, the tall stalks acting as support for the beans.

More recently, the commercial "bush bean" which does not require support and produces all its pods simultaneously has been developed.

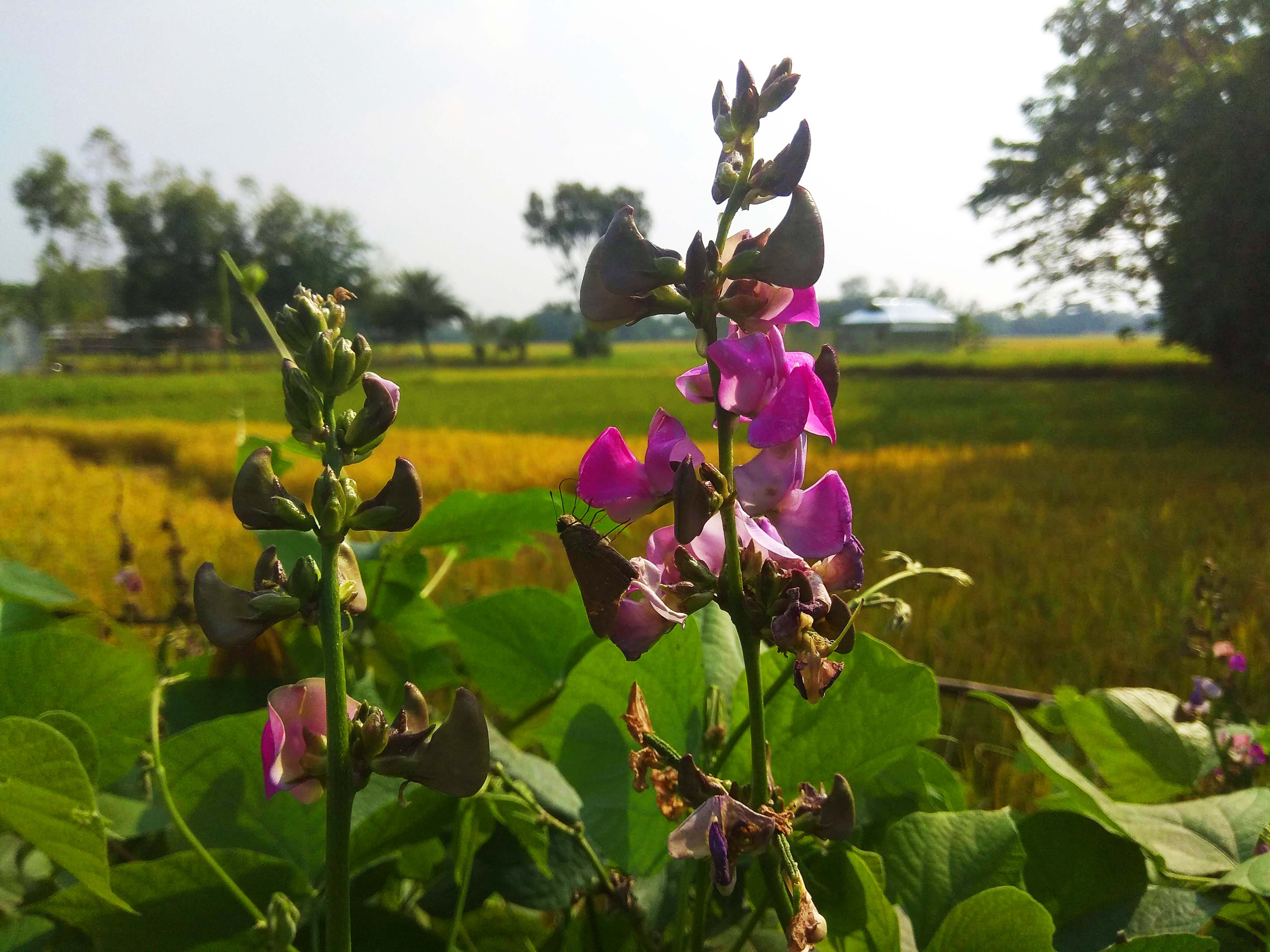
Flower with pollinator

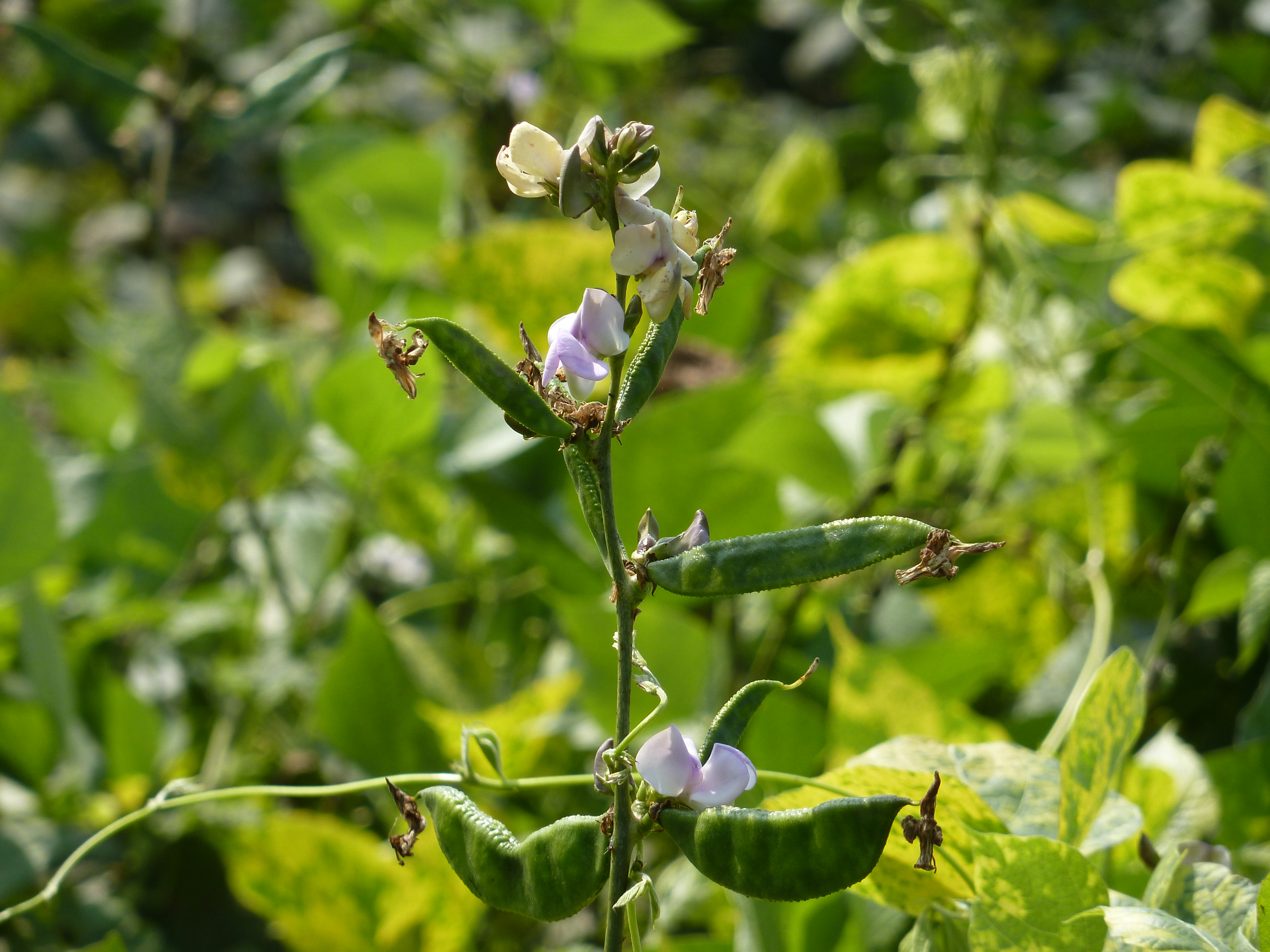
Lablab flowers and fruits

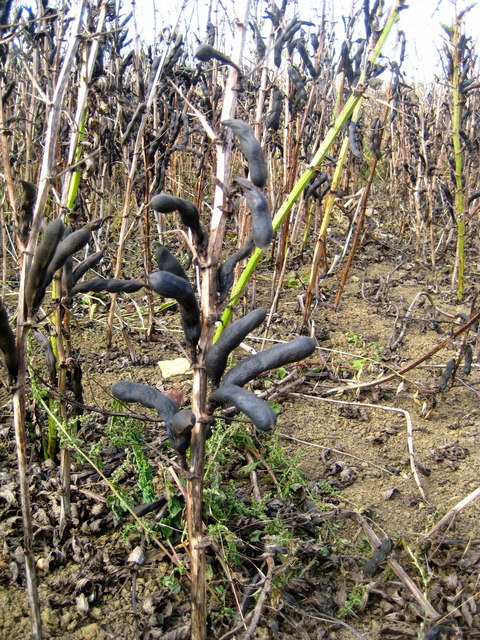
Broad beans ready for harvest

=== Production ===
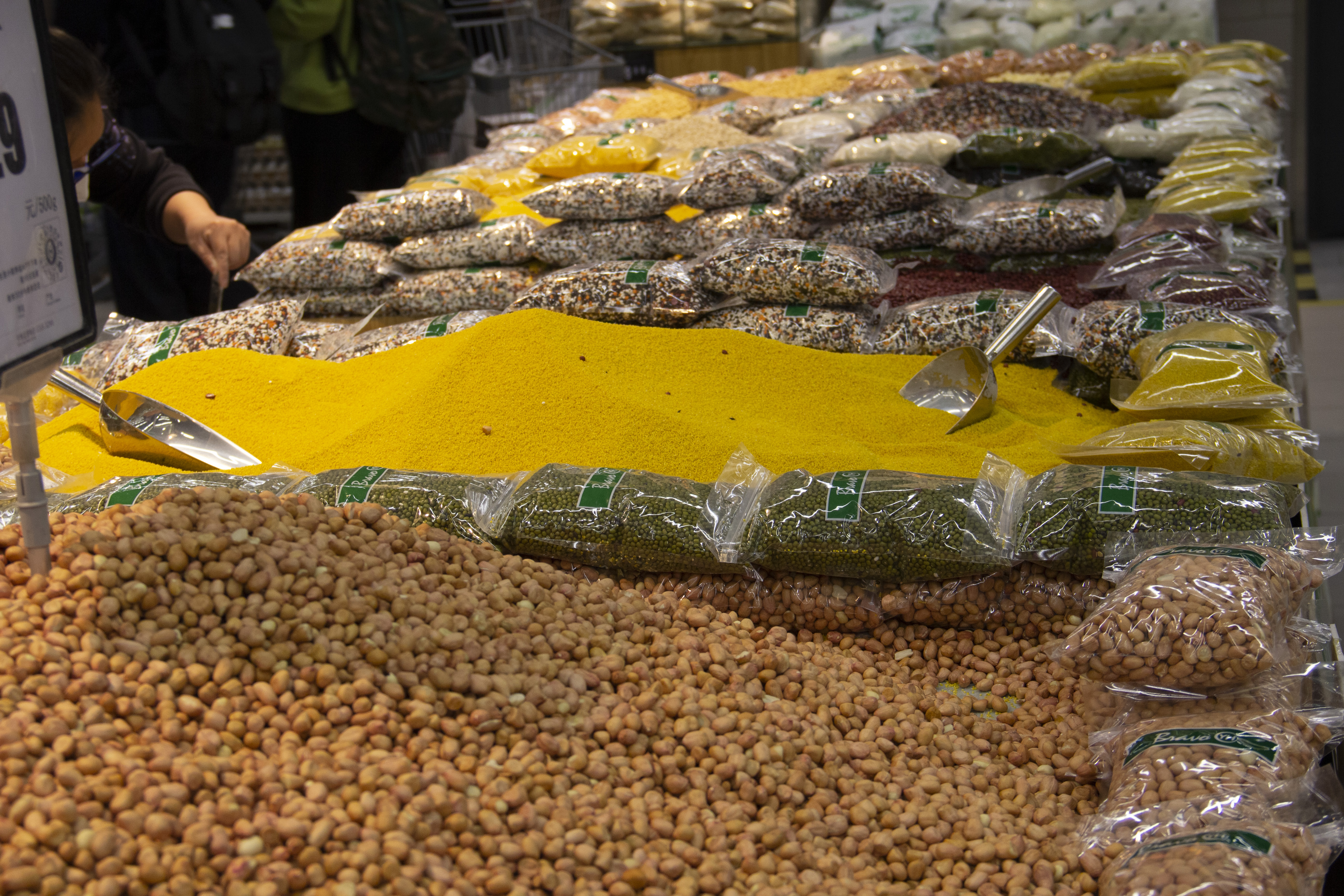
Beans in a market

The production data for legumes are published by FAO in three categories:

1. Pulses dry: all mature and dry seeds of leguminous plants except soybeans and groundnuts.
2. Oil crops: soybeans and groundnuts.
3. Fresh vegetable: immature green fresh fruits of leguminous plants.

The following is a summary of FAO data.

Bean production

Bean yields

Production of legumes (million metric tons)
Crops [FAO code]	1961	1981	2001	2015	2016	Ratio 2016 /1961	Remarks
Total pulses (dry) [1726]	40.78	41.63	56.23	77.57	81.80	2.01	Per capita production decreased. (Population grew 2.4×)
Oil crops (dry)
Soybeans [236]	26.88	88.53	177.02	323.20	334.89	12.46	Increase driven by animal feeds and oil.
Groundnuts, with shell [242]	14.13	20.58	35.82	45.08	43.98	3.11	
Fresh vegetables (80–90% water)
Beans, green [414]	2.63	4.09	10.92	23.12	23.60	8.96	
Peas, green [417]	3.79	5.66	12.41	19.44	19.88	5.25	

Top producers, pulses [1726] (Note: All legumes dry.) (million metric tons)
	Country	2016	Share
Total		81.80	100%
1	India	17.56	21.47%
2	Canada	8.20	10.03%
3	Myanmar	6.57	8.03%
4	China	4.23	5.17%
5	Nigeria	3.09	3.78%
6	Russia	2.94	3.60%
7	Ethiopia	2.73	3.34%
8	Brazil	2.62	3.21%
9	Australia	2.52	3.09%
10	United States	2.44	2.98%
11	Niger	2.06	2.51%
12	Tanzania	2.00	2.45%
	Others	24.82	30.34%

The world leader in production of dry beans (Phaseolus spp), (Note: Dry beans does not include broad beans, dry peas, chickpeas, and lentils.) is India, followed by Myanmar (Burma) and Brazil. In Africa, the most important producer is Tanzania.

Top ten dry beans (Phaseolus spp) producers, 2020
Rank	Country	Production (tonnes)	Footnote
1.	India	5,460,000	FAO figure
2.	Myanmar	3,053,012	Official figure
3.	Brazil	3,035,290	Aggregated data
4.	United States	1,495,180	Semi-official data
5.	China	1,281,586	Official figure
6.	Tanzania	1,267,648	FAO figure
7.	Mexico	1,056,071	Official figure
8.	Kenya	774,366	FAO figure
9.	Argentina	633,823	Semi-official data
10	Uganda	603,980	Official figure
Total	World	27,545,942	Aggregated data

Source: UN Food and Agriculture Organization (FAO)

== Uses ==
=== Culinary ===
Beans can be cooked in a wide variety of casseroles, curries, salads, soups, and stews. They can be served whole or mashed alongside meat or toast, or included in an omelette or a flatbread wrap. Other options are to include them in a bake with a cheese sauce, a Mexican-style chili con carne, or to use them as a meat substitute in a burger or in falafels. The French cassoulet is a slow-cooked stew with haricot beans, sausage, pork, mutton, and preserved goose. Soybeans can be processed into bean curd (tofu) or fermented into a cake (tempeh); these can be eaten fried or roasted like meat, or included in stir-fries, curries, and soups. Most dry beans contain 21–25% protein by weight; dry soybeans are 36.5% protein by weight.

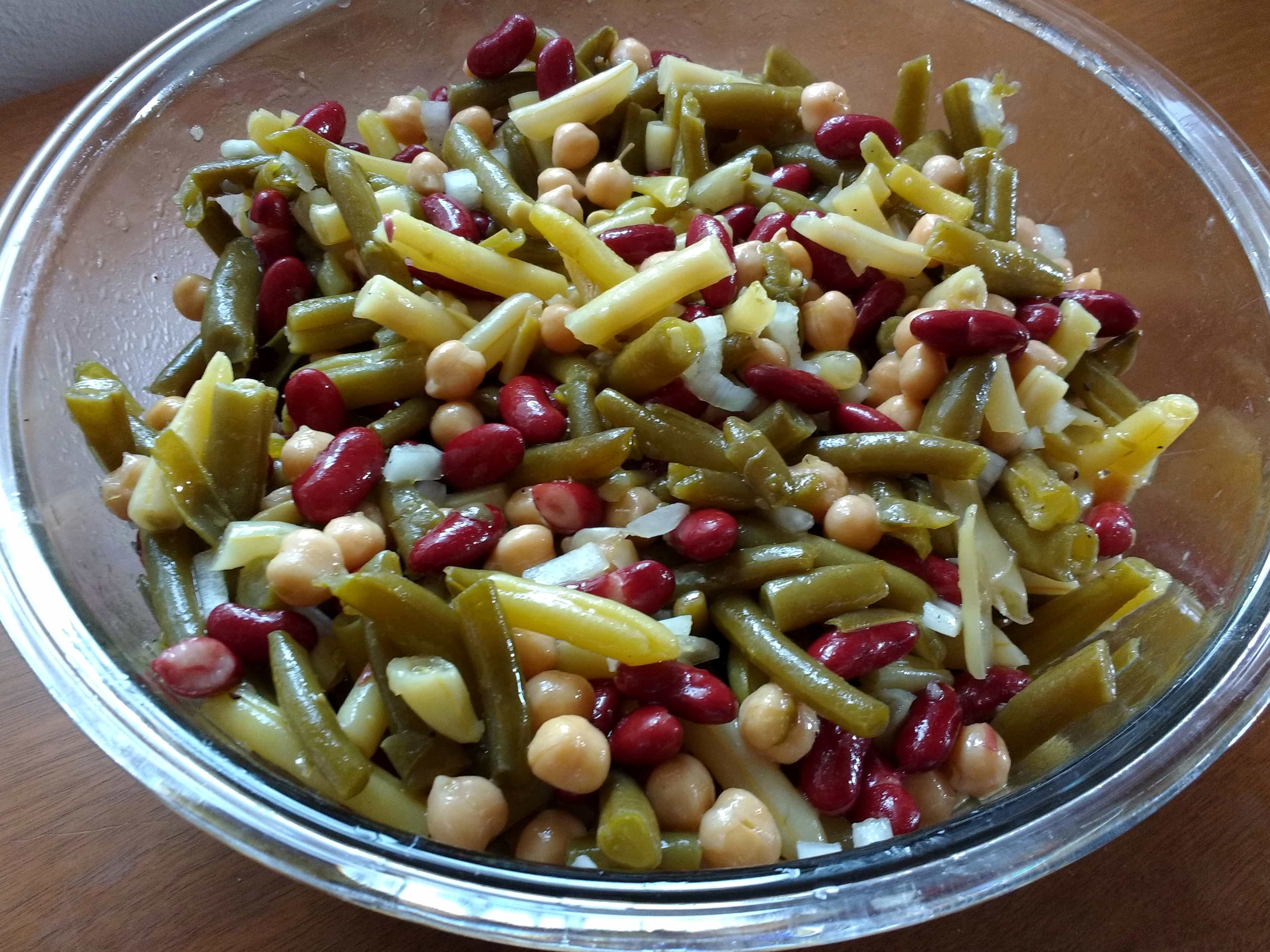
Bean salad

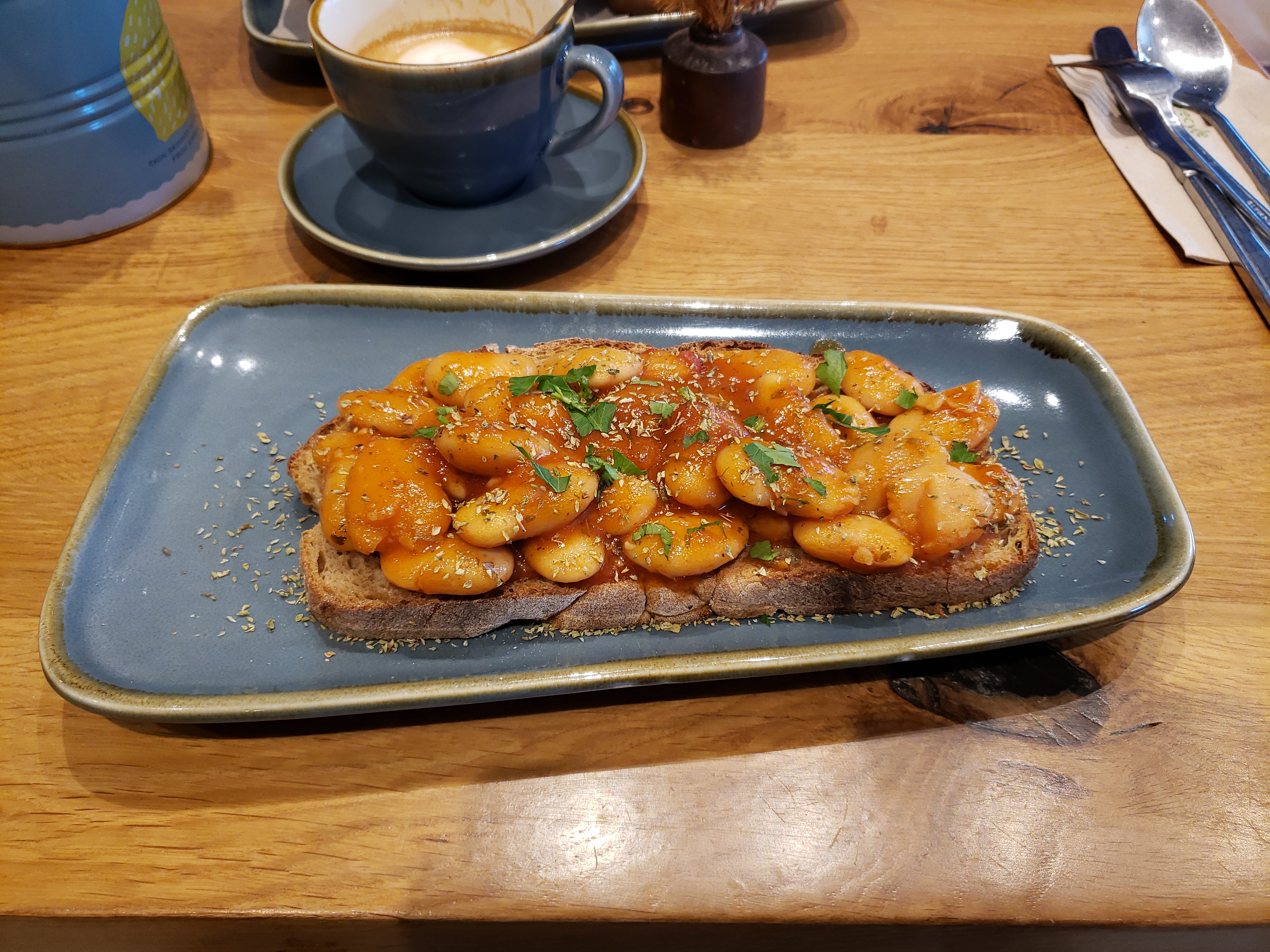
Beans on toast, Greece

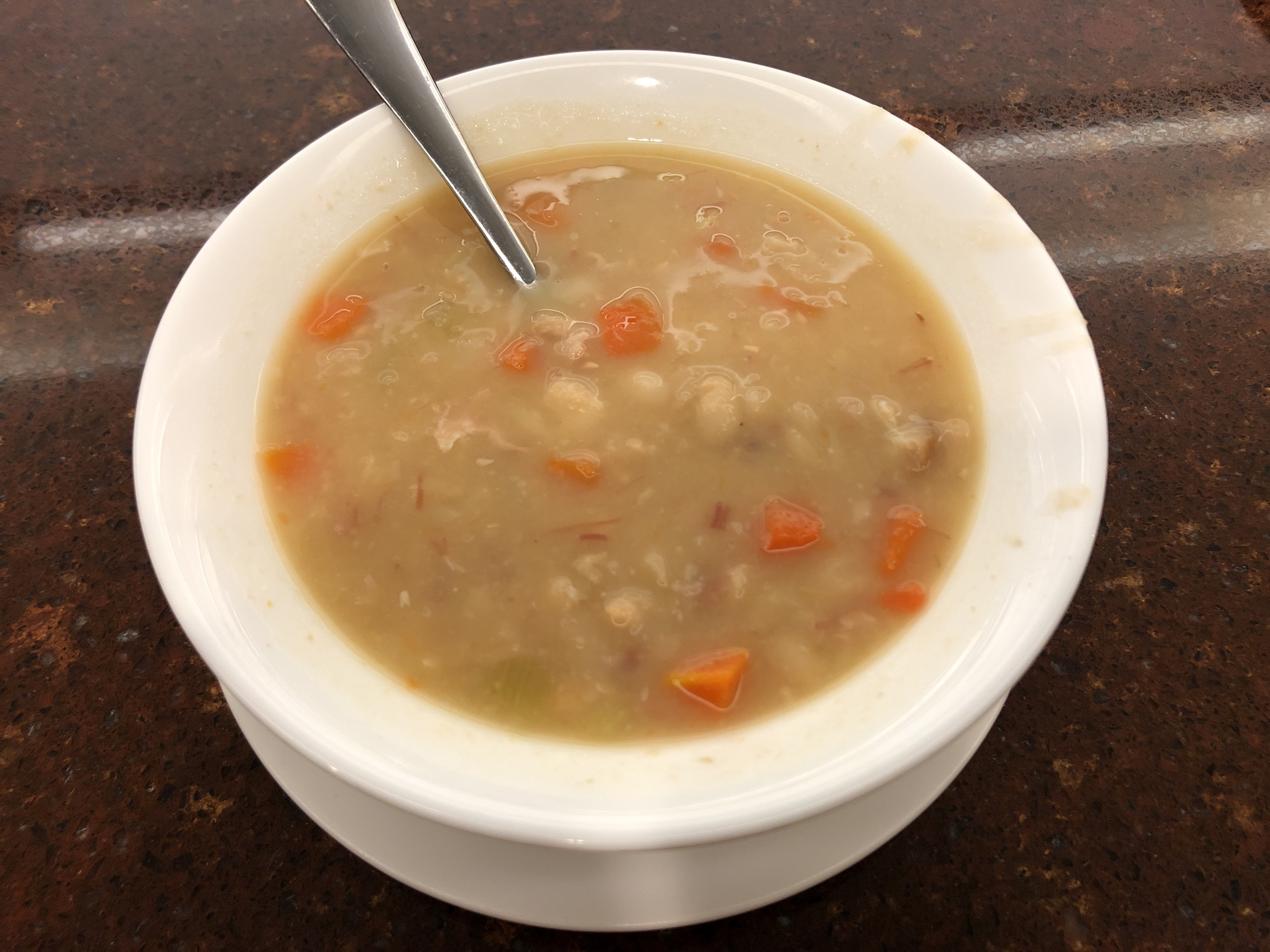
Bean soup

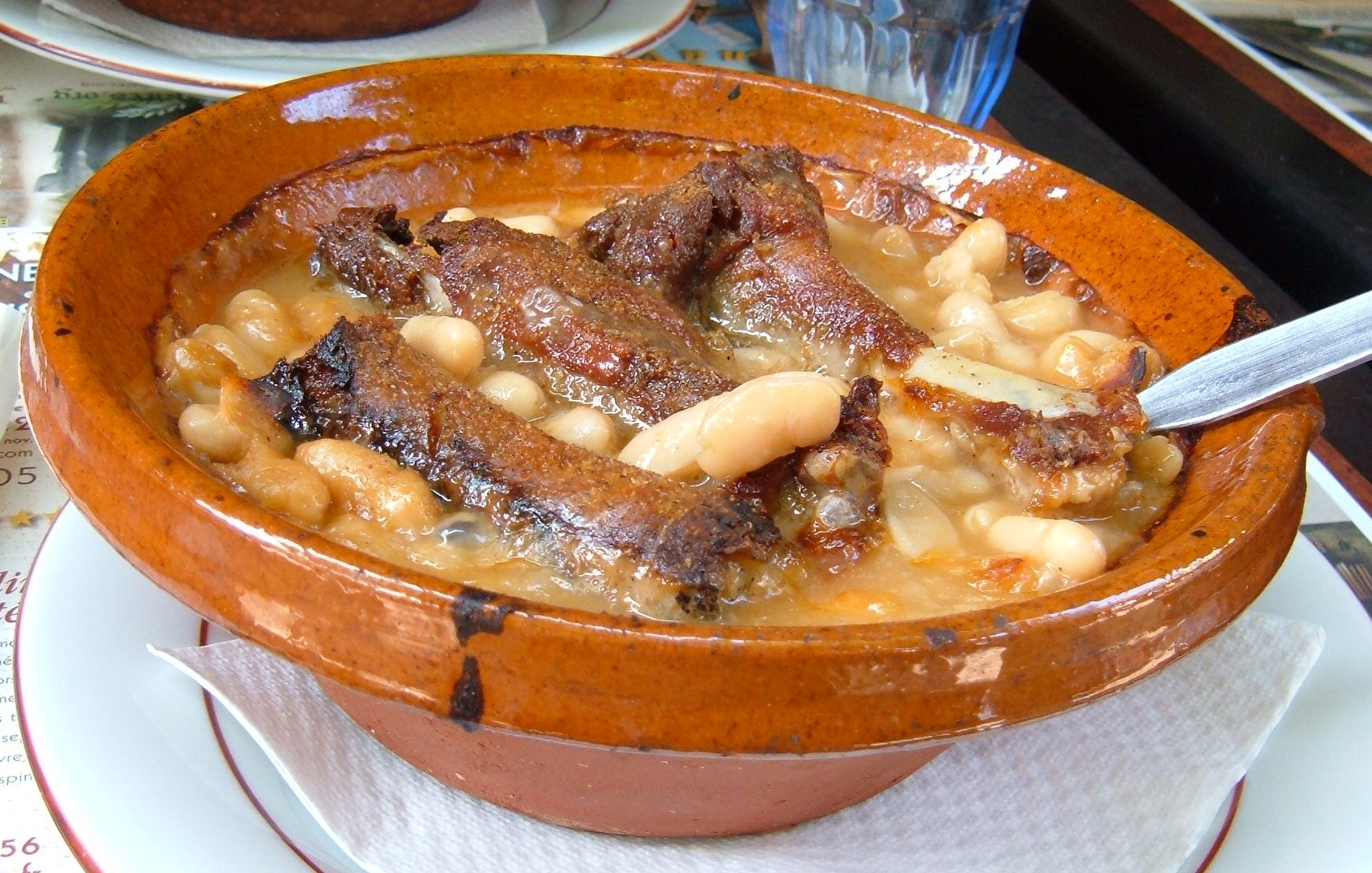
Cassoulet, France

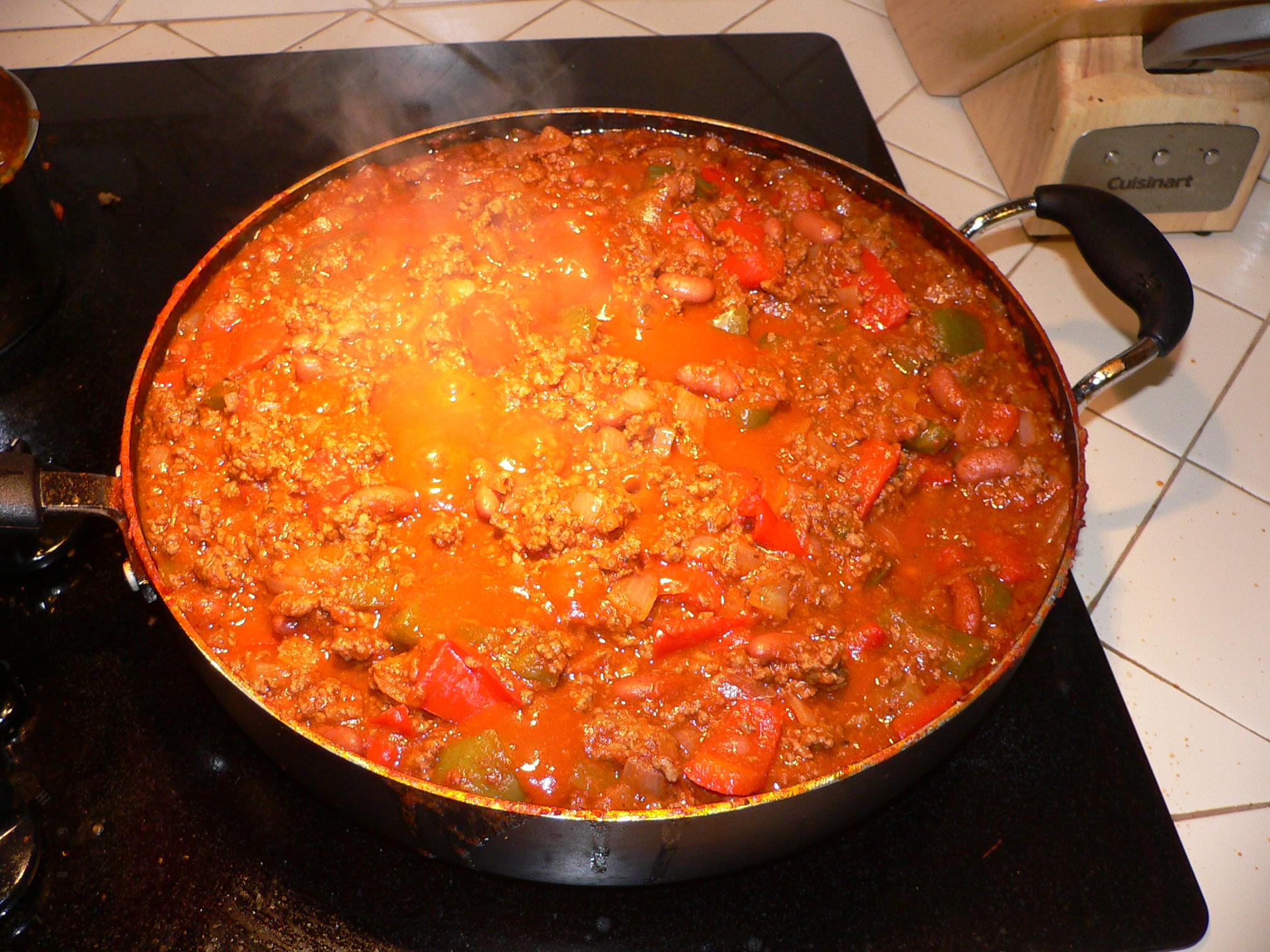
Chili con carne with meat, beans, and red peppers

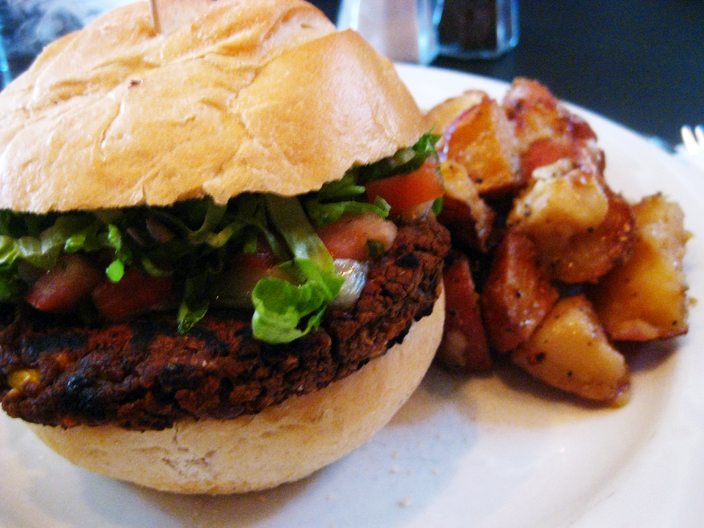
Bean burger

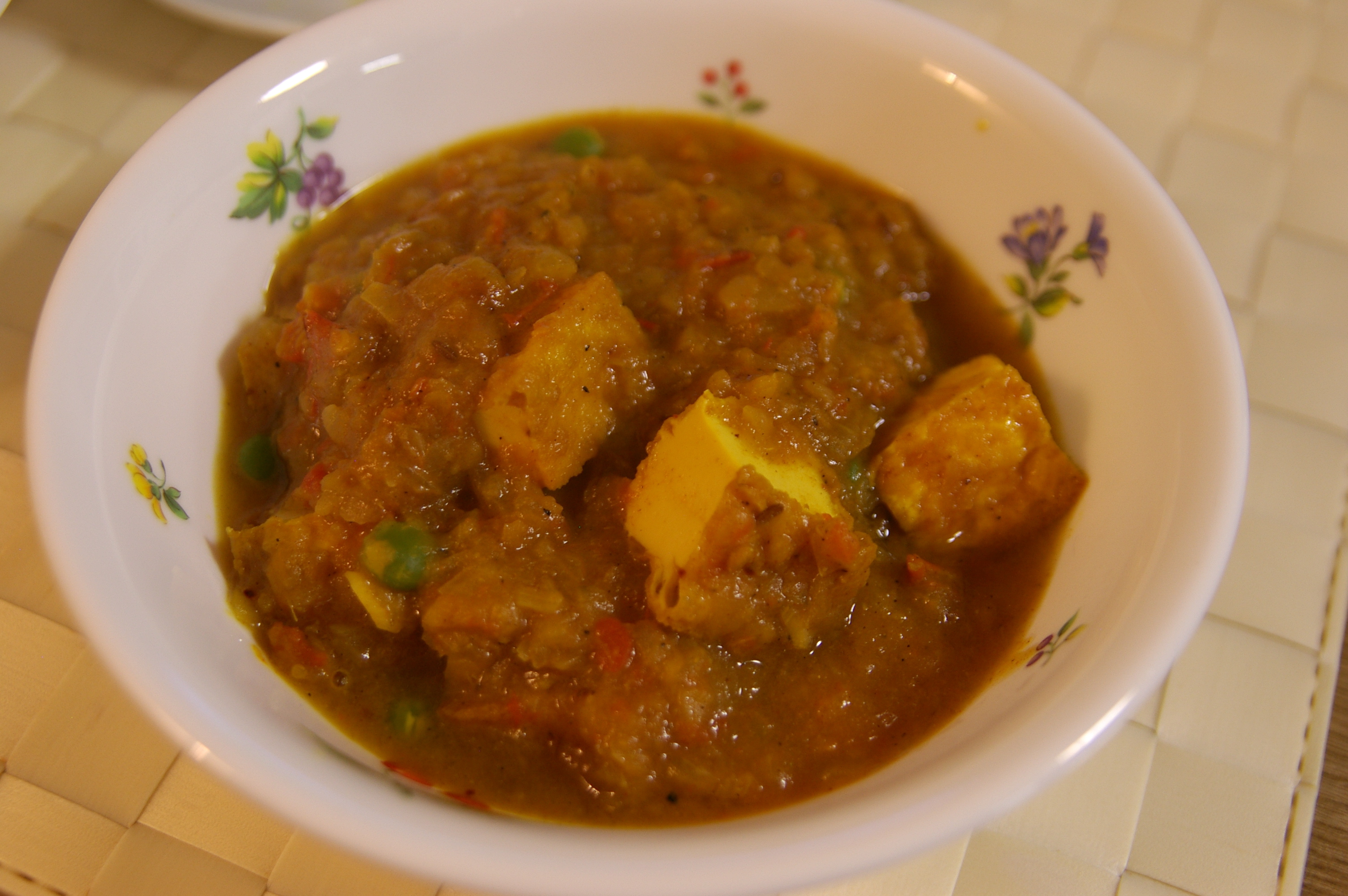
Bean curd curry

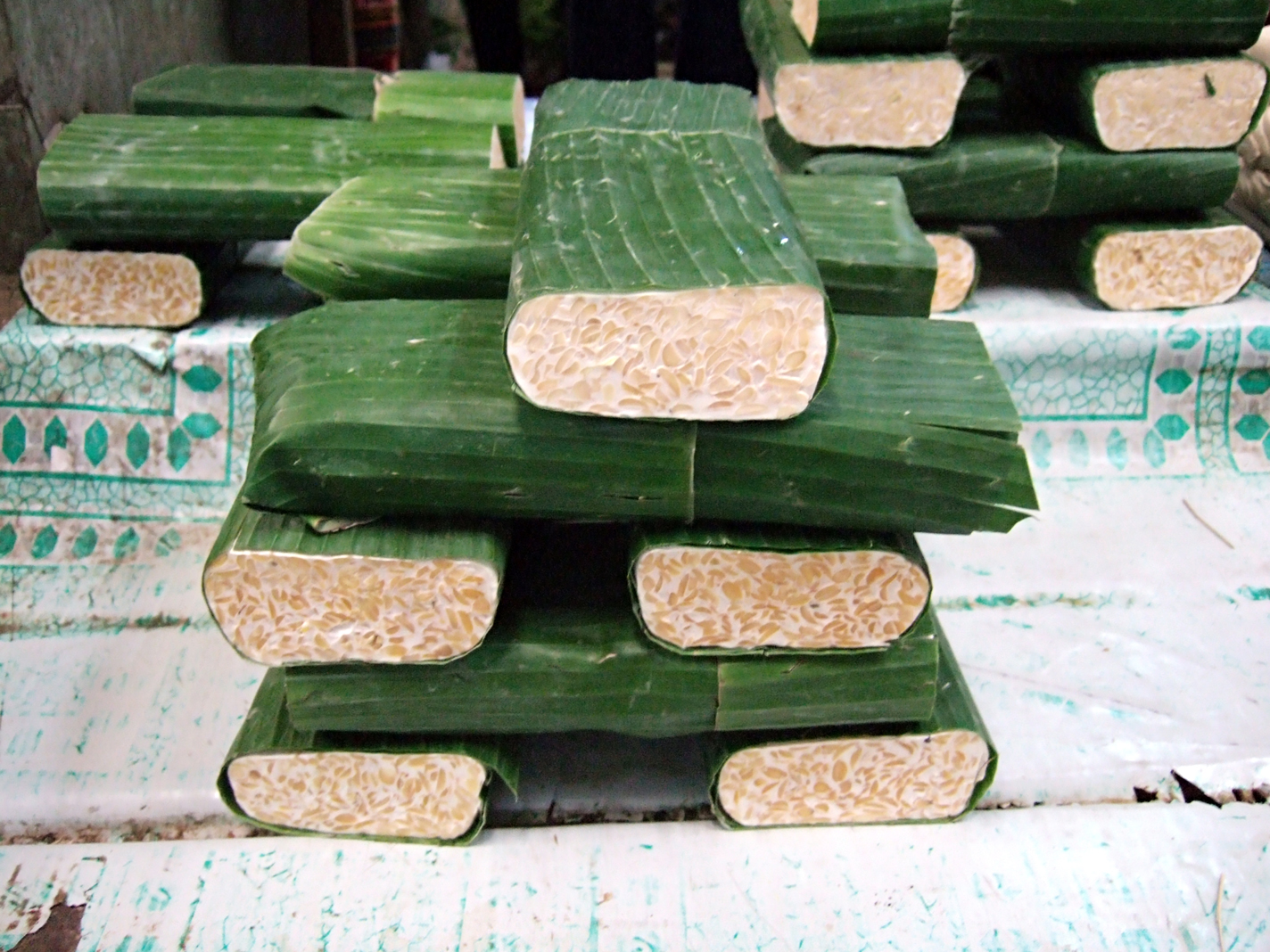
Tempeh cakes ready to cook, Indonesia

=== Other ===
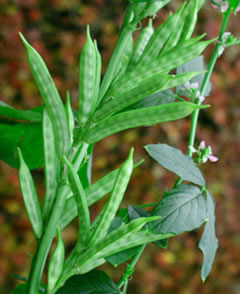
Guar beans are used for their gum.

Guar beans are used for their gum, a galactomannan polysaccharide. It is used to thicken and stabilise foods and other products.

== Health concerns ==
=== Toxins ===
Some kinds of raw beans contain a harmful, flavourless toxin: the lectin phytohaemagglutinin, which must be destroyed by cooking. Red kidney beans are particularly toxic, but other types also pose risks of food poisoning. Even small quantities (4 or 5 raw beans) may cause severe stomachache, vomiting, and diarrhoea. This risk does not apply to canned beans because they have already been cooked. A recommended method is to boil the beans for at least ten minutes; under-cooked beans may be more toxic than raw beans.

Beans need to be cooked thoroughly to destroy toxins; slow cooking is unsafe as it makes the beans soft without necessarily destroying the toxins. A case of poisoning by butter beans used to make falafel was reported; the beans were used instead of traditional broad beans or chickpeas, soaked and ground without boiling, made into patties, and shallow fried.

Bean poisoning is not well known in the medical community, and many cases may be misdiagnosed or never reported; figures appear not to be available. In the case of the United Kingdom National Poisons Information Service, available only to health professionals, the dangers of beans other than red beans were not flagged as of 2008.

Fermentation is used in some parts of Africa to make beans more digestible by removing toxins.

=== Other hazards ===
It is common to make beansprouts by letting some types of bean, often mung beans, germinate in moist and warm conditions; beansprouts may be used as ingredients in cooked dishes, or eaten raw or lightly cooked. There have been many outbreaks of disease from bacterial contamination, often by salmonella, listeria, and Escherichia coli, of beansprouts not thoroughly cooked, some causing significant mortality.

Many types of bean, such as kidney beans, contain significant amounts of antinutrients that inhibit some enzyme processes in the body. Phytic acid, present in beans, interferes with bone growth and interrupts vitamin D metabolism.

Many beans, including broad beans, navy beans, kidney beans and soybeans, contain large sugar molecules, oligosaccharides (particularly raffinose and stachyose). A suitable oligosaccharide-cleaving enzyme is necessary to digest these. As the human digestive tract does not contain such enzymes, oligosaccharides are digested by bacteria in the large intestine, producing gases such as methane, released as flatulence.

== In human society ==
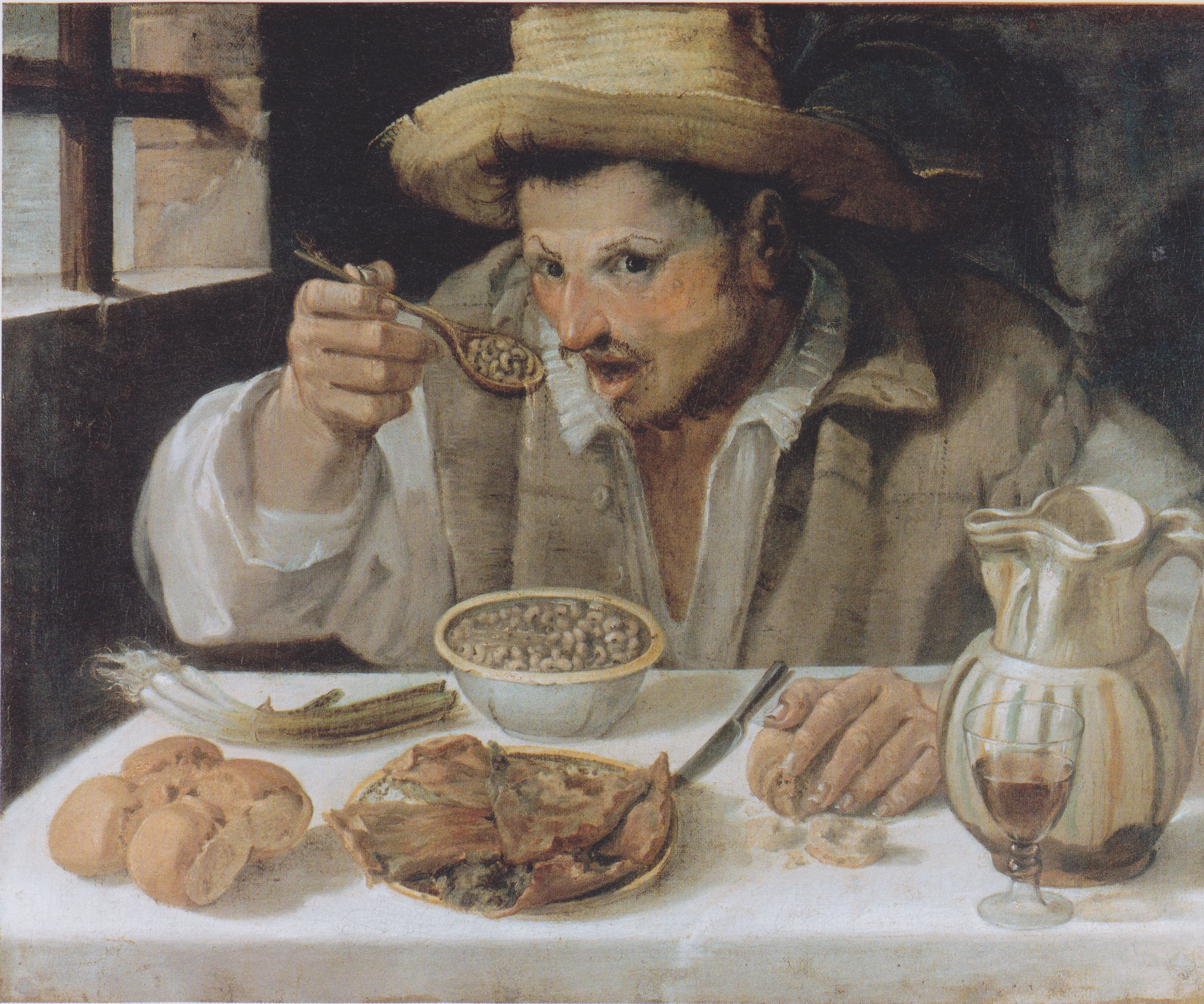
The Beaneater (c. 1584) by Annibale Carracci

Beans have traditionally been considered a food of the poor, as farmers ate grains and vegetables, obtaining their protein from beans, whereas the wealthier classes could afford meat. European society has what Ken Albala calls "a class-based antagonism" to beans.

Different cultures agree in disliking the flatulence that beans cause, and possess their own seasonings to attempt to remedy it: Mexico uses the herb epazote; India the aromatic resin asafoetida; Germany applies the herb savoury; in the Middle East, cumin; and Japan the seaweed kombu. A substance for which there is evidence of effectiveness in reducing flatulence is the enzyme alpha-galactosidase; extracted from the mould fungus Aspergillus niger, it breaks down glycolipids and glycoproteins. The reputation of beans for flatulence is the theme of a children's song "Beans, Beans, the Musical Fruit".

The Mexican jumping bean is a segment of a seed pod occupied by the larva of the moth Cydia saltitans, and sold as a novelty. The pods start to jump when warmed in the palm of the hand. Scientists have suggested that the random walk that results may help the larva to find shade and so to survive on hot days.

== See also ==
- Baked beans
- Fassoulada – a bean soup
- Genetically modified bean

== Bibliography ==
- Kaplan, Lawrence (2008). "Legumes in the History of Human Nutrition". In DuBois, Christine; Tan, Chee-Beng; Mintz, Sidney (eds.). The World of Soy. NUS Press. pp. 27–. ISBN 978-9971-69-413-5.
