= Phaseolus angustissimus =

Scientific classification
- Kingdom: Plantae
- Clade: Tracheophytes
- Clade: Angiosperms
- Clade: Eudicots
- Clade: Rosids
- Order: Fabales
- Family: Fabaceae
- Subfamily: Faboideae
- Genus: Phaseolus
- Species: P. angustissimus

Binomial name
- Phaseolus angustissimus A. Gray

Species of legume

Phaseolus angustissimus (common name slimleaf bean) is a perennial, herbaceous vine of the Fabaceae (legume) family, native to the American Southwest (particularly, Arizona, New Mexico, and Texas), as well as northern Sonora, Mexico. It is a close relative of the cultivated tepary bean (P. acutifolius), also native to the same region.

== Description ==
Phaseolus angustissimus is a perennial, herbaceous vine (to 2 meters) which trails along rocky, eroded hillsides. Its leaflets are distinctively narrow and waxy, it has a very deep, slightly thickened taproot, its flowers are magenta to purple and face upwards from the ground, and its pods are small and curved, yielding 2-4 seeds with a ridged seed coat and hypogeal germination. P. angustissimus has shown freezing resistance in field trials in Canada.

== Uses ==
The Zuni people rub the crushed leaves, blossoms and powdered root on a child's body as a strengthener.
