= Phaseolus grayanus =

Conservation status
- Apparently Secure (NatureServe)

Scientific classification
- Kingdom: Plantae
- Clade: Tracheophytes
- Clade: Angiosperms
- Clade: Eudicots
- Clade: Rosids
- Order: Fabales
- Family: Fabaceae
- Subfamily: Faboideae
- Genus: Phaseolus
- Species: P. grayanus

Binomial name
- Phaseolus grayanus Wooton & Standl.

Synonyms
- Phaseolus foliaceus Piper; Phaseolus palmeri Piper; Phaseolus pedicellatus var. grayanus (Wooton & Standl.) A.Delgado ex Isely; Phaseolus pyramidalis Freytag; Phaseolus wrightii var. grayanus (Wooton & Standl.) Kearney & Peebles

Species of plant

Phaseolus grayanus is a species of flowering plant in the family Fabaceae. It is a climbing vine native to Mexico and the southwestern United States.

== Description ==
Flowers of Phaseolus grayanus are pink and bilaterally symmetrical and may fade to a pale pink. Flowers have two banner petals, two wing petals, and two pale green or white petals that form the keel at the center. Dark green leaves are pinnately trifoliate with each leaflet being either broadly deltoid or lobed.

== Range ==
It is native to northern and western Mexico, and to Arizona, New Mexico, and Texas in the southwestern United States.
