= Phaseolus dumosus =

Scientific classification
- Kingdom: Plantae
- Clade: Tracheophytes
- Clade: Angiosperms
- Clade: Eudicots
- Clade: Rosids
- Order: Fabales
- Family: Fabaceae
- Subfamily: Faboideae
- Tribe: Phaseoleae
- Subtribe: Phaseolinae
- Genus: Phaseolus
- Species: P. dumosus

Binomial name
- Phaseolus dumosus Macfady

Synonyms
- Phaseolus polyanthus Greenm.; Phaseolus flavescens Piper; Phaseolus leucanthus Piper; Phaseolus harmsianus Diels.; Phaseolus coccineus subsp. darwinianus Hernandez & Miranda

Species of legume

Phaseolus dumosus (strict botanic Phaseolus × dumosus Macfad.), the year bean or year-long bean, is an annual to perennial herbaceous vine in the family Fabaceae (legumes), native to a narrow region in the highlands of Guatemala. It is one of the five Phaseolus domesticates and is similarly used for its beans. It was recently found to be a hybrid between two other cultivated species of Central America, Phaseolus coccineus and P. vulgaris and displays intermediate characteristics. Taxonomically, it was previously categorized as Phaseolus polyanthus and P. coccineus ssp. darwinianus.

This species grows in humid forests and may reach 10 meters in length. It is visited by carpenter bees.

The epithet 'dumosus' means bushy or shrubby.

The plant prefers a cool and humid environment.
