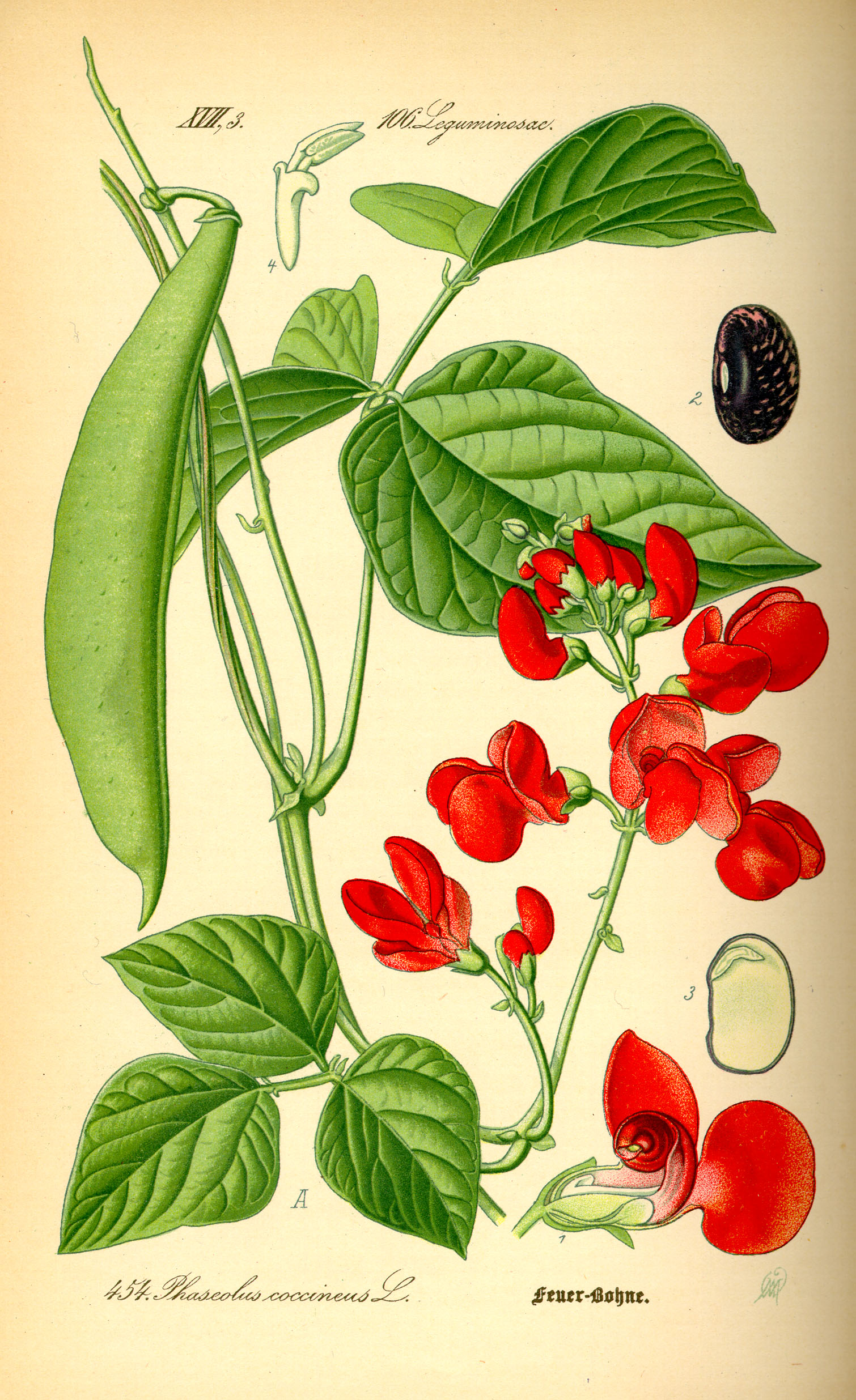

Scientific classification
- Kingdom: Plantae
- Clade: Tracheophytes
- Clade: Angiosperms
- Clade: Eudicots
- Clade: Rosids
- Order: Fabales
- Family: Fabaceae
- Subfamily: Faboideae
- Genus: Phaseolus
- Species: P. coccineus

Binomial name
- Phaseolus coccineus L.

Synonyms
- List: Lipusa formosa (Kunth) Alef.; Lipusa multiflora Alef.; Phaseolus flavescens Piper; Phaseolus formosus Kunth; Phaseolus griseus Piper; Phaseolus harmsianus Diels; Phaseolus leiosepalus Piper; Phaseolus multiflorus Lam.; Phaseolus multiflorus Willd.; Phaseolus obvallatus Schltdl.; Phaseolus polyanthus Greenm.; Phaseolus prorifirus M.E. Jones; Phaseolus striatus Brandegee; Phaseolus strigillosus Piper; Phaseolus superbus A.DC.; Phaseolus sylvestris Kunth; Phaseolus vulgaris var. coccineus L.

= Phaseolus coccineus =

Runner bean

Species of flowering plant

Phaseolus coccineus, known as runner bean, scarlet runner bean, or multiflora bean, is a plant in the legume family, Fabaceae. Another common name is butter bean, which can also refer to the lima bean, a different species.

It is grown both as a food plant and an ornamental plant.

== Description ==
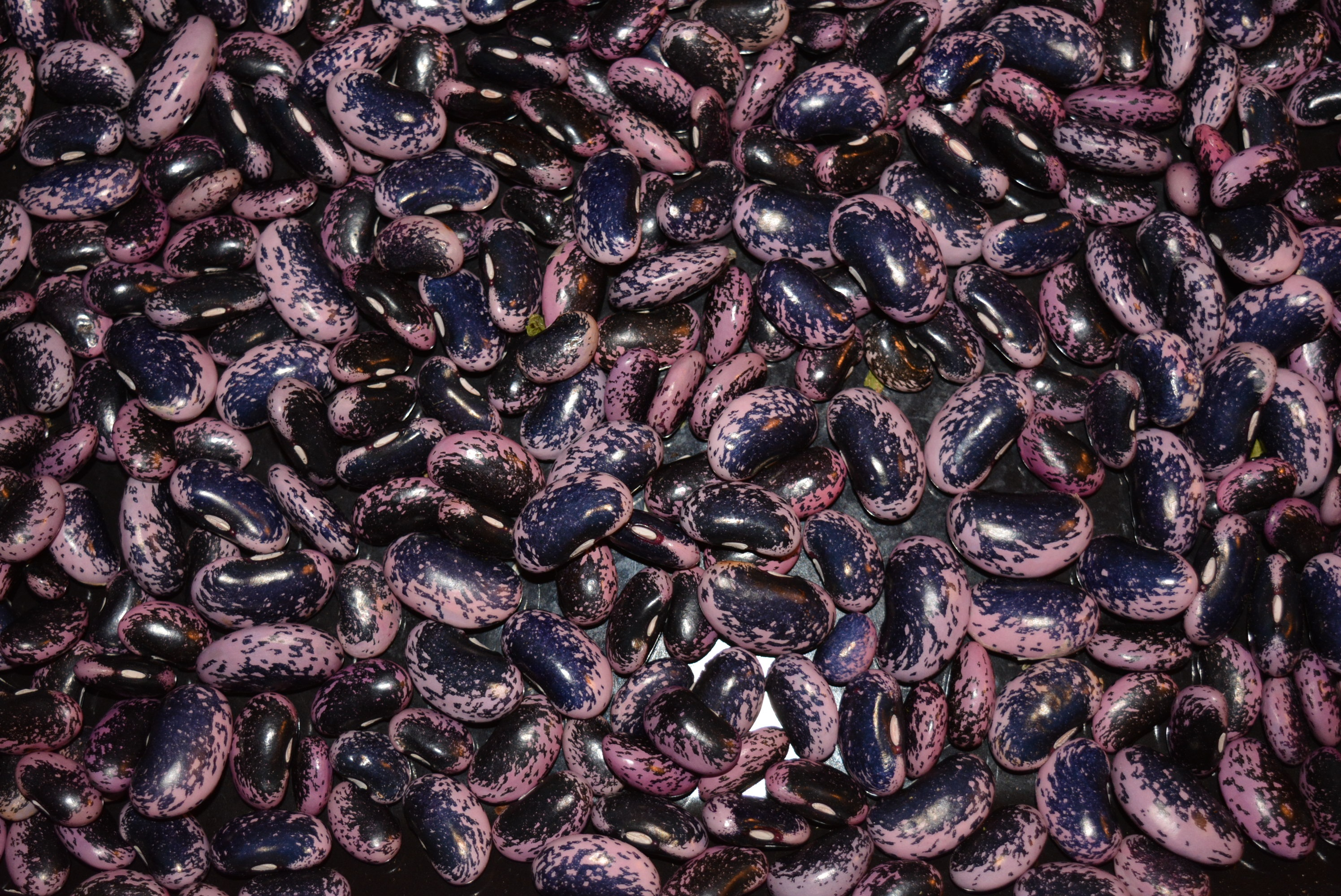
Beans of 'Scarlet Runner' cultivar. A similar cultivar, the Japanese runner, looks the same but is almost twice as large.

This species originated in the mountains of Central America. It was most likely cultivated in the highlands of Mexico and Guatemala around 2000 BC. Most varieties have red flowers and multicolored seeds (though some have white flowers and white seeds) and are often grown as ornamental plants. The vine can grow to 3 metres (9.8 ft) or more in length, its pods can get to 25 centimetres (9.8 in), and its beans about 2.5 centimetres (0.98 in) long.

It differs from the common bean (P. vulgaris) in several respects: the cotyledons stay in the ground during germination, and the plant is a perennial vine with tuberous roots (though it is frequently treated as an annual in colder climates).

The knife-shaped pods are normally green; however, there are rare varieties bred by amateurs that have purple pods. An example of such a purple-podded runner bean is 'Aeron Purple Star'.

Runner beans have also been called "Oregon lima bean", and in Nahuatl ayocotl or in Spanish ayocote. Runner beans, like all beans, contain the toxic protein phytohaemagglutinin and thus should be cooked well before eating.

== Uses ==
Runner beans were grown as food plants in North America and Europe from the 1600s, and also as ornamentals for their attractive flowers. However, they came to be used primarily as a garden ornamental plant in North America, including for temporary screening. The flowers attract hummingbirds, bees and other insects. In the UK and other European countries – where the vegetable is a popular choice for kitchen gardens and allotments – the flowers came to be ignored, or treated as an attractive bonus to cultivating the plant for the beans.

It is a plant visited by honeybees for both pollen and nectar, from which they produce a monofloral honey that is traditionally appreciated in Poland.

The seeds of the plant can be used fresh or as dried beans. The pods are eaten whole while young and not yet fibrous, though they tend to have a rougher surface than the common bean. The starchy roots of this perennial are eaten in Mesoamerica.

The beans are used in many cuisines. It is a popular side vegetable in British cuisine. A variety named 'Judión de la Granja' producing large, white, edible beans is cultivated in San Ildefonso, Spain. It is the basis of a Segovian regional dish also named Judiones de la Granja, in which the beans are mixed with pig's ears, pig's trotters, and chorizo, amongst other ingredients.

In Greece, cultivars of the runner bean with white blossom and white beans are known as fasolia gigantes (φασόλια γίγαντες). They are grown under protective law in the north of Greece within the regions of Kato Nevrokopi, Florina and Kastoria. The beans have an important role in Greek cuisine, appearing in many dishes (such as Gigantes plaki). In English, they are sometimes colloquially referred to as elephant beans. In Austria the coloured versions are cultivated and served as "Käferbohnen" ("beetle-bean"), a dish made of the dry beans with pumpkin seed oil. It is considered a typical dish of regional Austrian cuisine, but dried runner beans are also consumed to a small extent in Germany. In Turkey, runner beans are the main ingredient in bean Pilaki and Piyaz.

Greece and northern Africa are the sources of pods of the runner beans sold as "green beans" in European markets during the cold period. The pods can be identified by their flatness, big size and the rougher surface.

Cultivars include:

- 'Aeron Purple Star' (not available commercially)
- 'Black Runner'
- 'Butler'
- 'Case Knife'
- 'Fasolia gigantes', a white bean which originated in Greece.
- 'Hammond's Dwarf'
- 'Japanese Runner', sold in Canada and USA under the names of "Akahana" or "Shinshu runner"
- 'Painted Lady'
- 'Pickwick Dwarf'
- 'Polestar'
- 'Scarlet Runner'
- 'White Dutch Runner'

P. coccineus subsp. darwinianus is a cultivated subspecies, commonly referred to as the botil bean in Mexico.

The related species considered most useful for interbreeding with P. coccineus to increase its genetic diversity are P. dumosus and P. vulgaris.

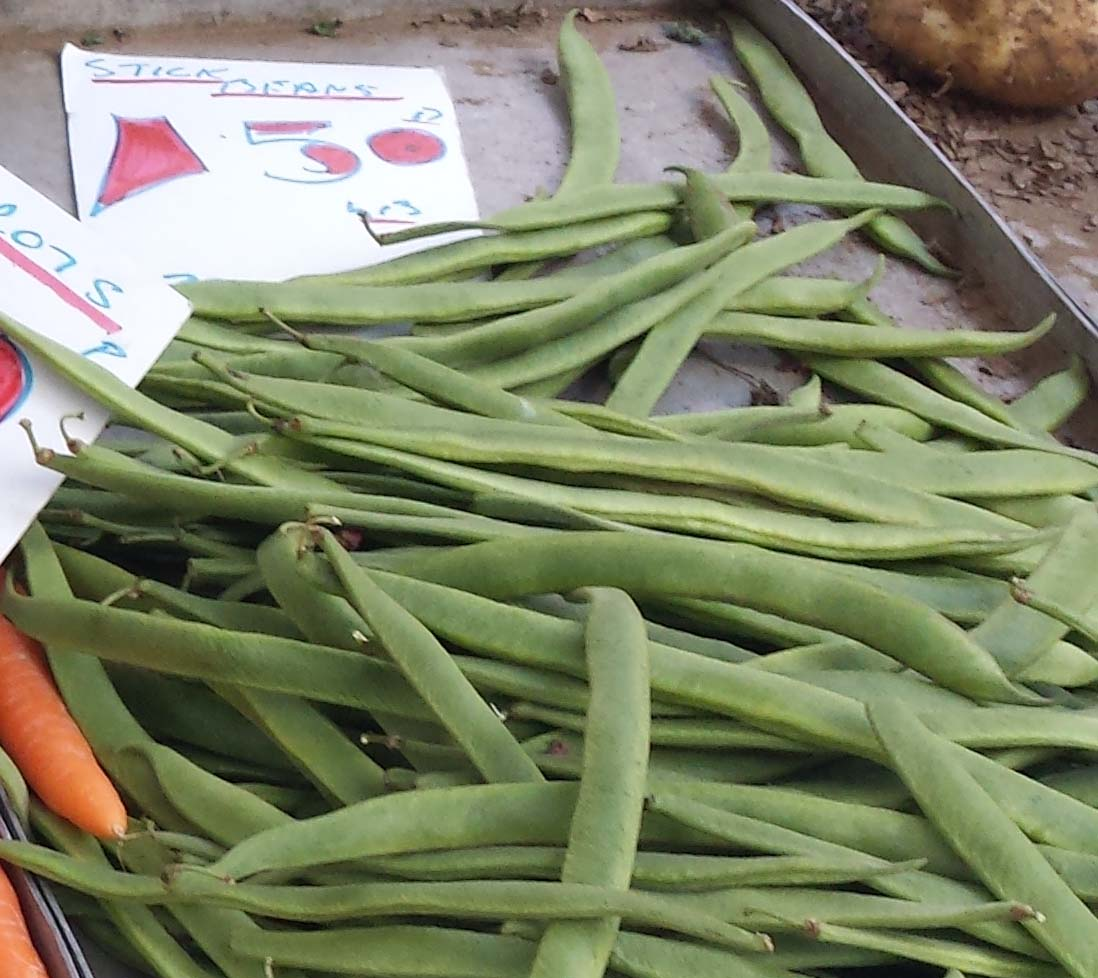
Runner (stick) beans for sale on a UK market stall

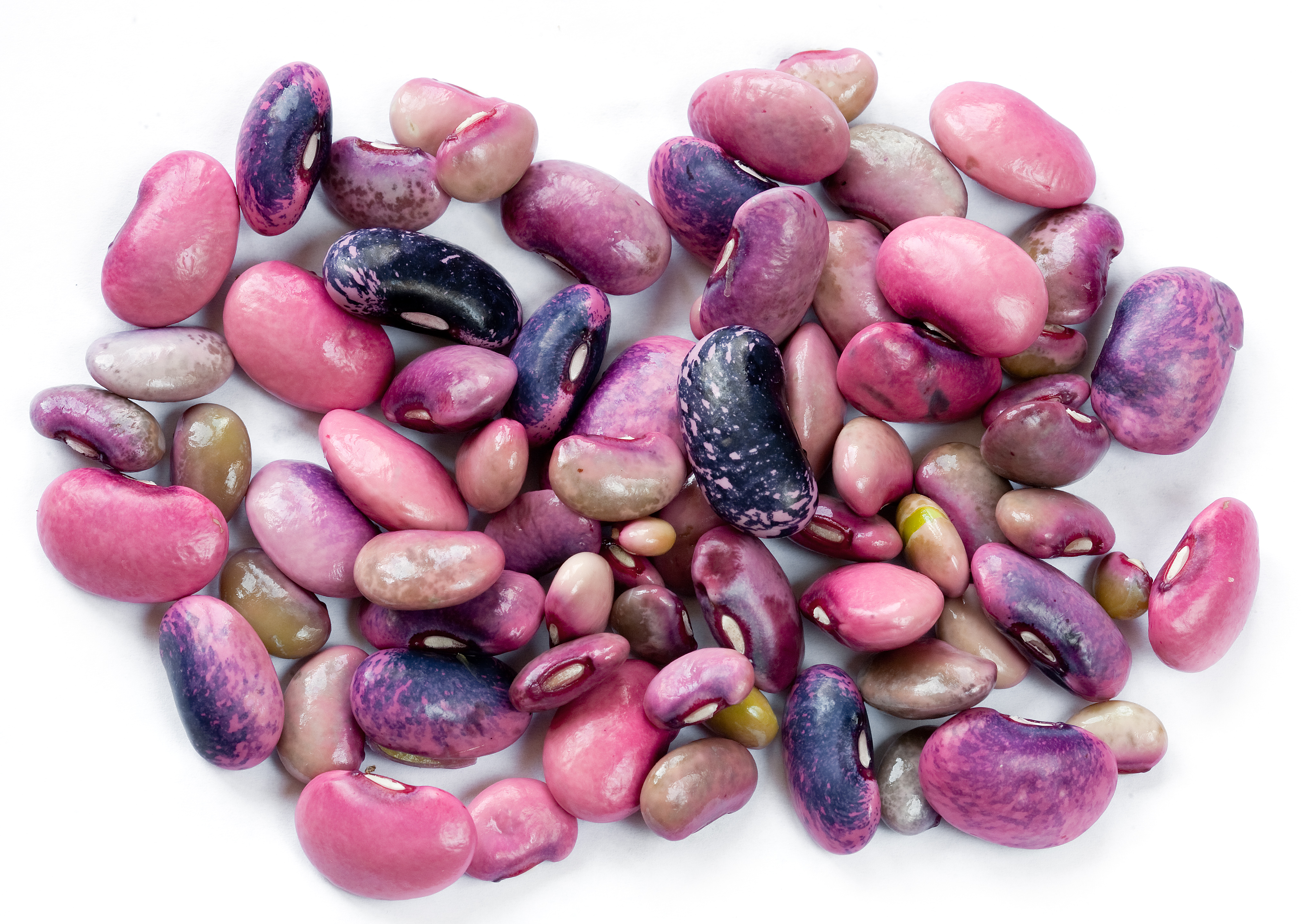
Seeds of 'Scarlet Emperor'

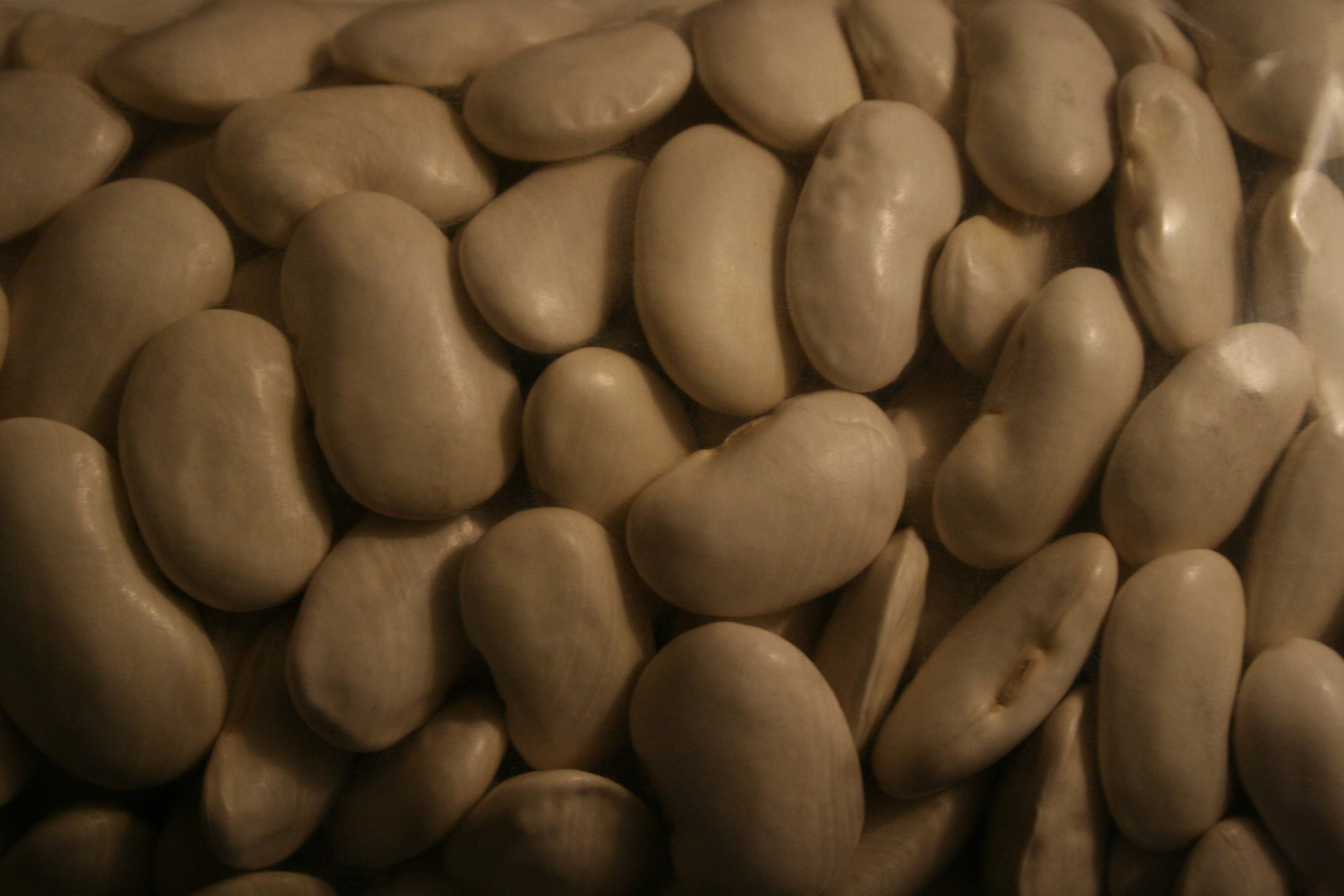
Spanish variety Judión de la Granja

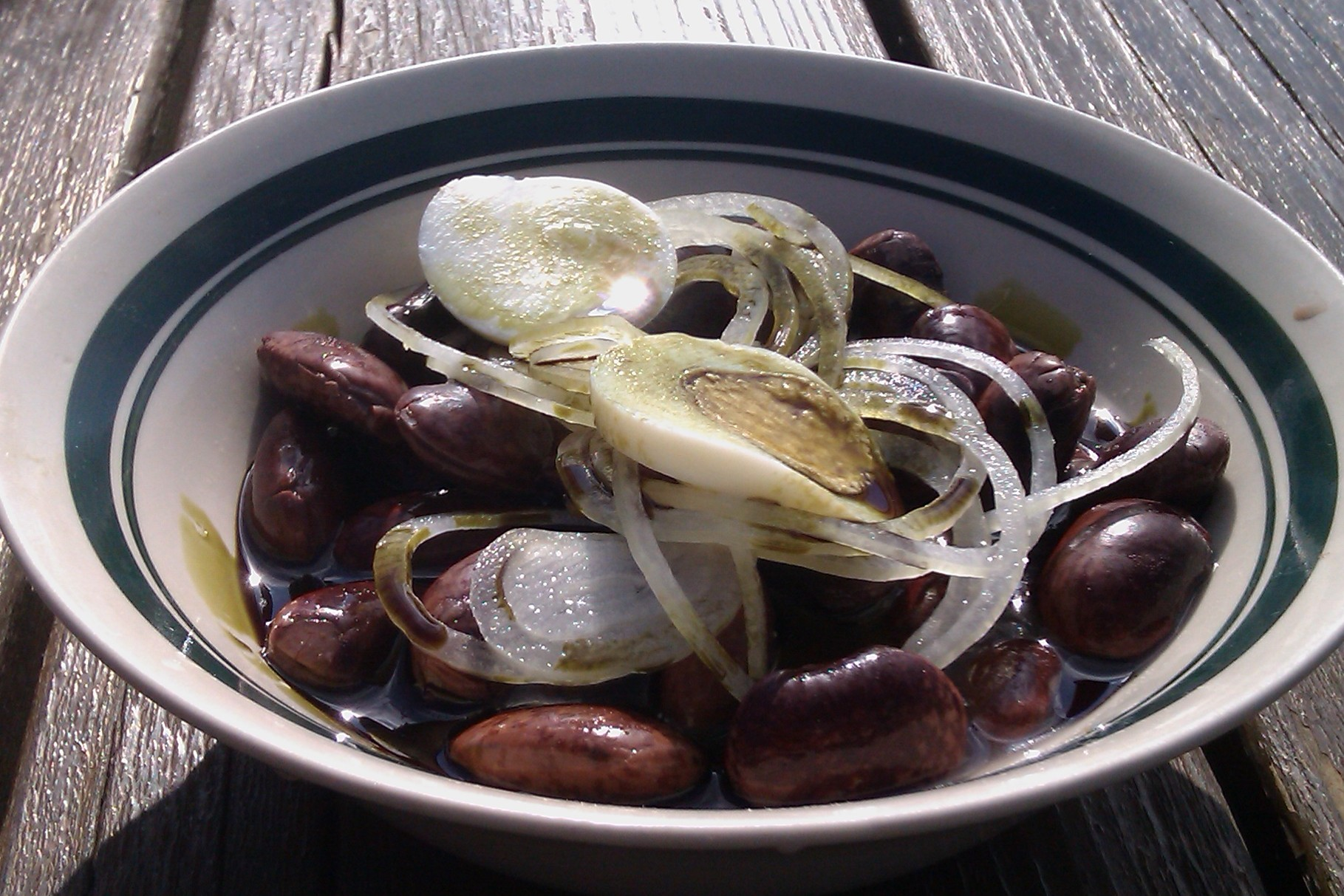
Austrian "Käferbohnen salad" that contains pumpkin seed oil and sliced onions

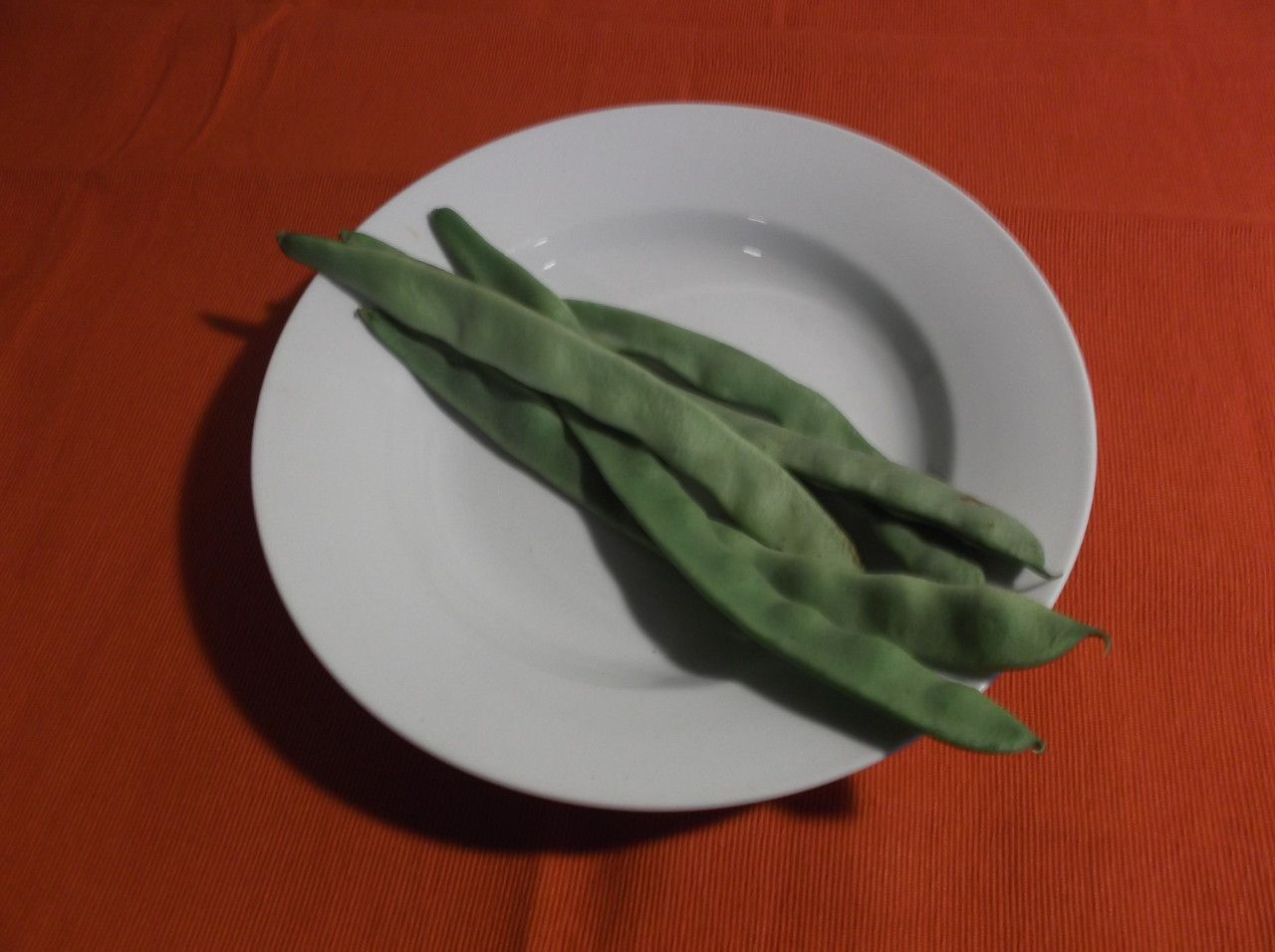
Flat beans are often eaten in India, normally cooked and served as whole pods.

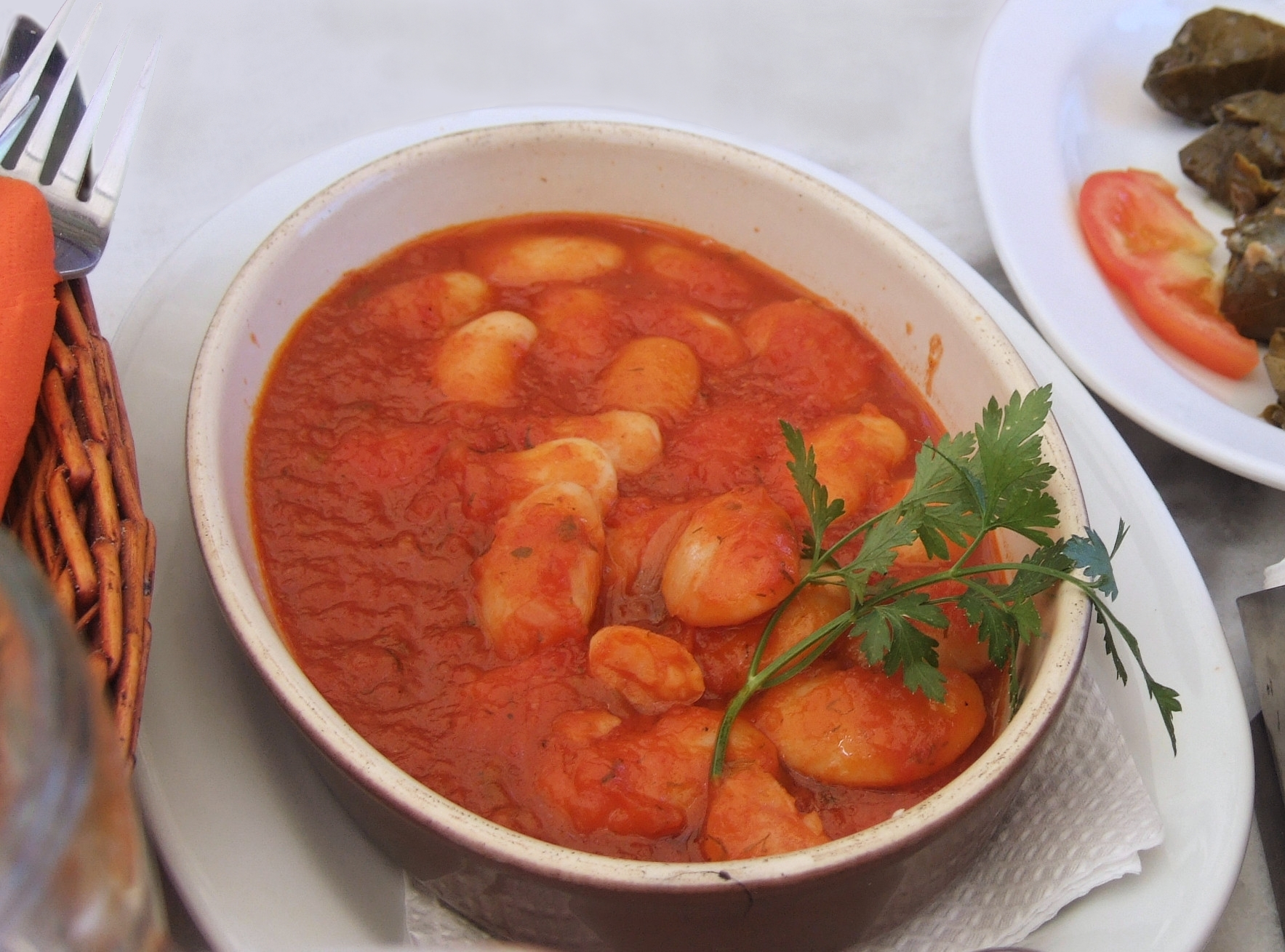
Giant beans, a Mediterranean side dish: cooked runner beans in tomato sauce.
