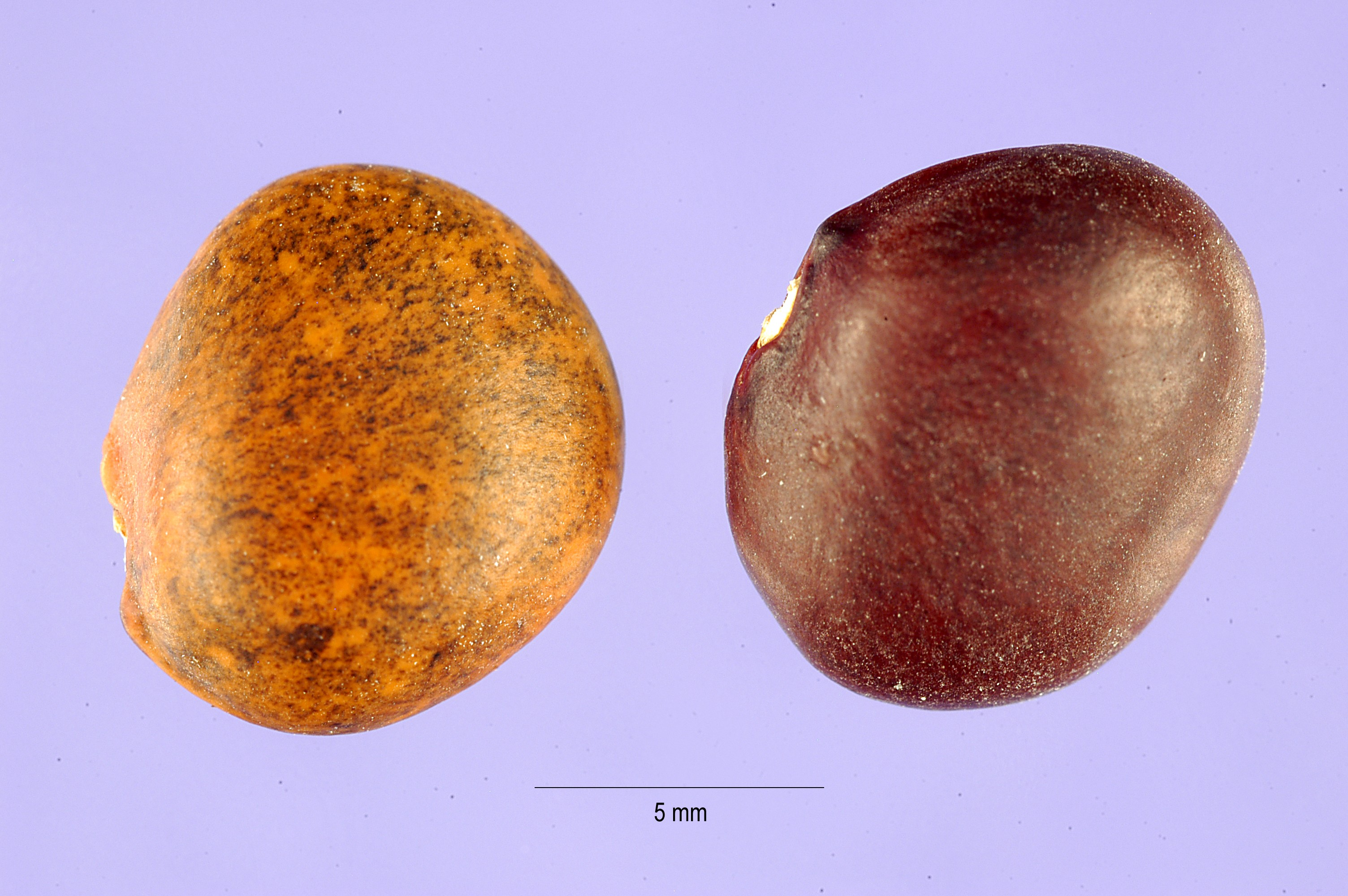

Scientific classification
- Kingdom: Plantae
- Clade: Tracheophytes
- Clade: Angiosperms
- Clade: Eudicots
- Clade: Rosids
- Order: Fabales
- Family: Fabaceae
- Subfamily: Faboideae
- Genus: Phaseolus
- Species: P. maculatus

Binomial name
- Phaseolus maculatus Scheele

Synonyms
- Phaseolus metcalfei Wooton & Standl.; Phaseolus ovatifolius Piper; Phaseolus retusus Benth.

= Phaseolus maculatus =

Species of legume

Phaseolus maculatus (Metcalfe bean, prairie bean, spotted bean) is a plant native to Mexico and the southwestern United States from Arizona, New Mexico, and Texas. It is found on dry, rocky hillsides in meadows and in wooded areas from 1500 to 2400 m (5000–8000 ft) in elevation.

P. maculatus is a trailing perennial herb with a large, woody taproot. Leaves are trifoliate, oval, up to 8 cm (3.2 in) long, with small uncinate (hooked) hairs. Leaf blades tend to be oriented vertically so they do are not pressed against the ground. Flowers are purple. Seeds are mottled black and brown.

== Uses ==
This bean is often used as livestock forage, and it is cited as a gene source for disease resistance in the lima bean (P. lunatus) by Germplasm Resources Information Network. The Tarahumara peoples of the Sierra Madre Occidental in Chihuahua use the roots medicinally and also make glue from the shoots. The species is also occasionally grown as an ornamental.
