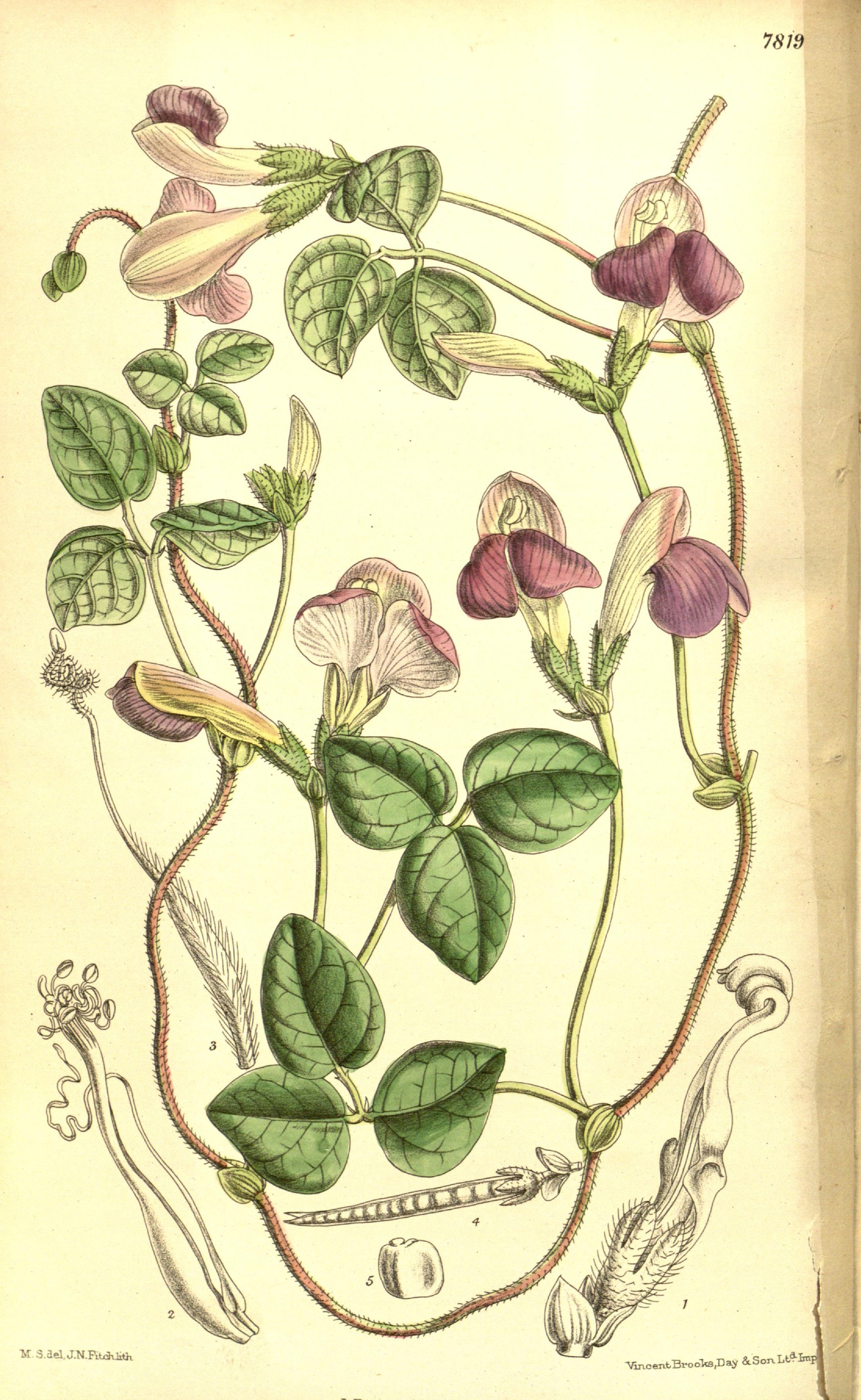

Conservation status
- Least Concern (IUCN 3.1)

Scientific classification
- Kingdom: Plantae
- Clade: Tracheophytes
- Clade: Angiosperms
- Clade: Eudicots
- Clade: Rosids
- Order: Fabales
- Family: Fabaceae
- Subfamily: Faboideae
- Genus: Phaseolus
- Species: P. pauciflorus

Binomial name
- Phaseolus pauciflorus Sessé & Moc. ex G.Don, 1832

Synonyms
- Minkelersia biflora Hemsl. Minkelersia galactioides M.Martens & Galeotti; Phaseolus galactioides (M.Martens & Galeotti) Maréchal, Mascherpa & Stainier; Phaseolus lambertianus D.Dietr.

= Phaseolus pauciflorus =

Species of legume

Phaseolus pauciflorus is a species of wild bean native to Mexico and Guatemala.

== Taxonomy ==
The name Phaseolus pauciflorus has been used to represent at least 3 different species. Other species that have previously been called Phaseolus pauciflorus include Vigna dalzelliana (P. pauciflorus Dalzell) and Strophostyles leiosperma (Torr. & A. Gray) Piper (P. pauciflorus Benth.)
