= Cocolmeca =

Cocolmeca is a common name for several plants and may refer to:

- Dioscorea mexicana
- Phaseolus ritensis
- Smilax aristolochiifolia, native to Mexico and Central America
- Smilax cordifolia
