= Phaseolus ritensis =

Scientific classification
- Kingdom: Plantae
- Clade: Tracheophytes
- Clade: Angiosperms
- Clade: Eudicots
- Clade: Rosids
- Order: Fabales
- Family: Fabaceae
- Subfamily: Faboideae
- Genus: Phaseolus
- Species: P. ritensis

Binomial name
- Phaseolus ritensis M.E.Jones

Synonyms
- Phaseolus retusus Benth, illegitimate

Species of legume

Phaseolus ritensis is a plant species native to Arizona, Sonora, Chihuahua, Sinaloa and Nuevo León. Common names include "Santa Rita Mountain bean" (in US) and "cocolmeca" in Mexico. It grows in forested areas in the mountains.

Phaseolus ritensis is a perennial herb with a large woody taproot. It is a trailing herb with trifoliate leaves and pink to lavender flowers.

== Uses ==
The plant is widely valued for both food and medicine throughout much of its native range. Green and ripe fruits served as an important food source in times past. Roots are the source of medicine, glue, and a fermenting agent.
