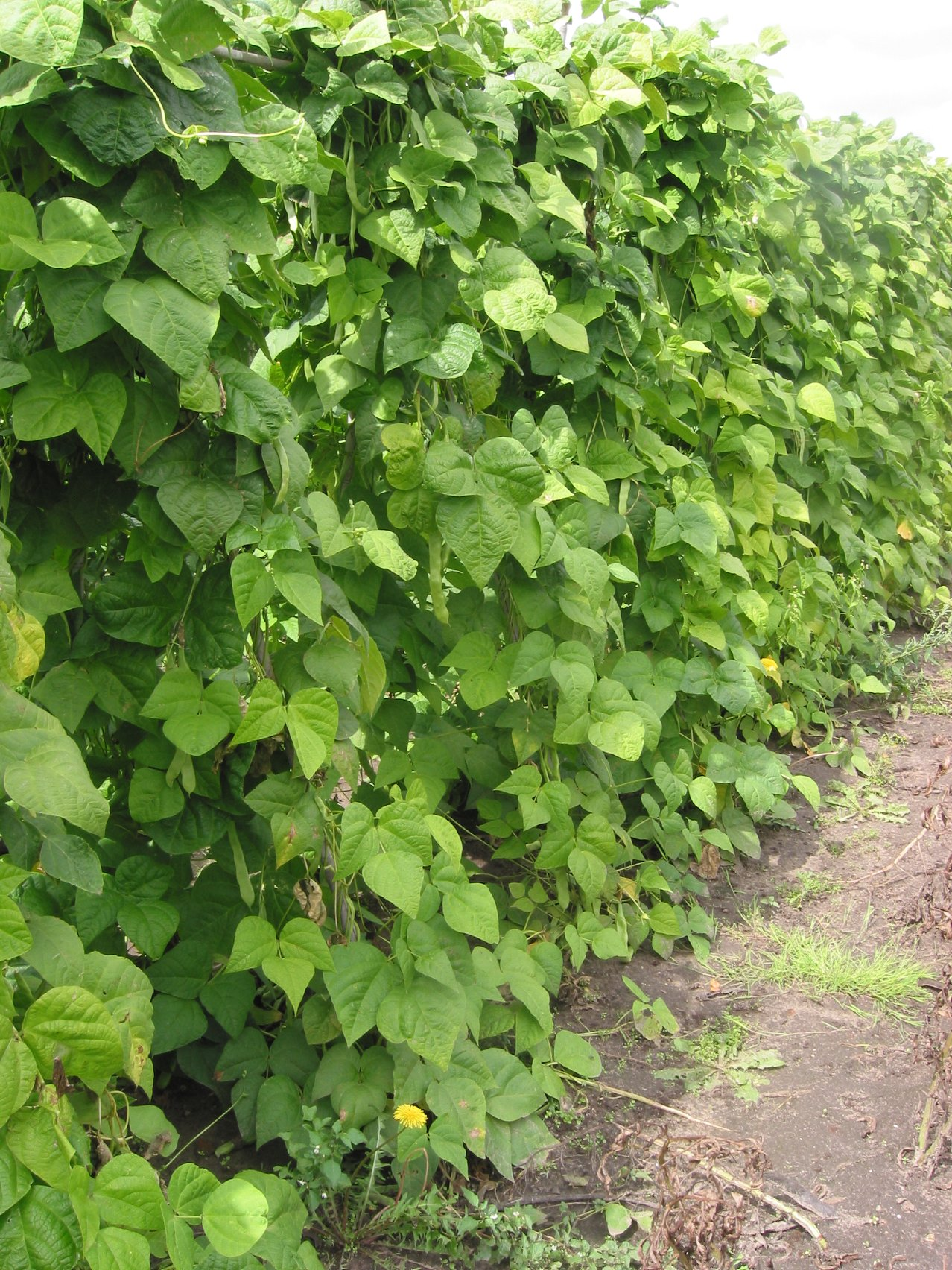
- P. vulgaris

Scientific classification
- Kingdom: Plantae
- Clade: Tracheophytes
- Clade: Angiosperms
- Clade: Eudicots
- Clade: Rosids
- Order: Fabales
- Family: Fabaceae
- Subfamily: Faboideae
- Subtribe: Phaseolinae
- Genus: Phaseolus; L. (1753)

Type species
- Phaseolus vulgaris L.

Species
- See text.

Synonyms
- Alepidocalyx Piper (1926); Lipusa Alef. (1866); Minkelersia M.Martens & Galeotti (1843)

= Phaseolus =

Genus of legumes

Phaseolus (bean, wild bean) is a genus of herbaceous to woody annual and perennial vines in the family Fabaceae containing about 70 plant species, all native to the Americas, primarily Mesoamerica.

It is one of the most economically important legume genera. Five of the species have been domesticated since pre-Columbian times for their beans: P. acutifolius (tepary bean), P. coccineus (runner bean), P. dumosus (year bean), P. lunatus (lima bean), and P. vulgaris (common bean). Most prominent among these is the common bean, P. vulgaris, which today is cultivated worldwide in tropical, semitropical, and temperate climates.

== Ecology ==
Phaseolus species are used as food plants by the larvae of some Lepidoptera species, including common swift, garden dart, ghost moth, Hypercompe albicornis, H. icasia and the nutmeg.

== Taxonomy ==
The generic name Phaseolus was introduced by Linnaeus in 1753, from the Latin phaseolus, a diminutive of phasēlus, in turn borrowed from Greek φάσηλος phasēlos used for either a species labelled as Vigna sinensis, or "calavance" which is an old name for the chickpea; that word itself is of unknown origin. The Ancient Greeks probably referred to any bean in a pod as phasēlos including those species, mung bean as well as black gram which were brought to them from Asia during their time; the name extended to the New World beans with the introduction of common bean into Europe via Columbian exchange in the 16th century and later given the name Phaseolus vulgaris.

=== Species ===
Species have been organized into eight groups based on phylogenetic clades:

Filiformis group
- Phaseolus angustissimus A. Gray
- Phaseolus filiformis—slimjim bean
- Phaseolus carterae

Leptostachyus group

- Phaseolus leptostachyus
- Phaseolus macvaughii
- Phaseolus micranthus

Lunatus group

- Phaseolus augusti
- Phaseolus bolivianus
- Phaseolus lunatus—lima bean, butter bean
- Phaseolus pachyrrhizoides
- Phaseolus viridis
- Phaseolus mollis

Pauciflorus group

- Phaseolus pauciflorus
- Phaseolus parvulus
- Phaseolus perplexus
- Phaseolus pluriflorus
- Phaseolus tenellus

Pedicellatus group

- Phaseolus altimontanus
- Phaseolus dasycarpus
- Phaseolus esperanzae
- Phaseolus grayanus
- Phaseolus laxiflorus
- Phaseolus neglectus
- Phaseolus pedicellatus
- Phaseolus texensis

Polystachios group

- Phaseolus albinervus
- Phaseolus jaliscanus
- Phaseolus juquilensis
- Phaseolus maculatus—spotted bean
- Phaseolus marechalii
- Phaseolus polystachios
- Phaseolus reticulatus
- Phaseolus ritensis
- Phaseolus smilacifolius

Tuerckheimii group

- Phaseolus chiapasanus
- Phaseolus gladiolatus
- Phaseolus hintonii
- Phaseolus oligospermus
- Phaseolus tuerckheimii
- Phaseolus xanthrotrichus
- Phaseolus zimapanensis

Vulgaris group

- Phaseolus acutifolius—tepary bean
- Phaseolus albescens
- Phaseolus coccineus—runner bean
- Phaseolus costaricensis
- Phaseolus dumosus—year bean
- Phaseolus parvifolius
- Phaseolus persistentus
- Phaseolus vulgaris—common bean, French bean, black bean, kidney bean, pinto bean, green bean

Uncategorized

- Phaseolus amblyosepalus
- Phaseolus anisotrichos
- Phaseolus brevicalyx
- Phaseolus chacoensis
- Phaseolus cibellii
- Phaseolus galactoides
- Phaseolus glabellus
- Phaseolus leucanthus
- Phaseolus macrolepis
- Phaseolus massaiensis
- Phaseolus microcarpus
- Phaseolus nelsonii
- Phaseolus oaxacanus
- Phaseolus plagiocylix
- Phaseolus polymorphus
- Phaseolus sonorensis
- Phaseolus vulcanicus

Previous classifications placed a number of other well-known legume species in this genus, but they were subsequently reassigned to the genus Vigna, sometimes necessitating a change of species name. For example, older literature refers to the mung bean as Phaseolus aureus, whereas more modern sources classify it as Vigna radiata. Similarly, the snail bean Vigna caracalla was discovered in 1753 and in 1970 moved from Phaseolus to Vigna. The modern understanding of Phaseolus indicates a genus endemic only to the New World.

== Allergenicity ==
The Phaseolus plant has an OPALS plant allergy scale rating of 4 out of 10, indicating moderate potential to cause allergic reactions, exacerbated by over-use of the same plant throughout a garden. Leaves can cause skin rash and old plants often carry rust.
