= Phaseolus glabellus =

Scientific classification
- Kingdom: Plantae
- Clade: Tracheophytes
- Clade: Angiosperms
- Clade: Eudicots
- Clade: Rosids
- Order: Fabales
- Family: Fabaceae
- Subfamily: Faboideae
- Genus: Phaseolus
- Species: P. glabellus

Binomial name
- Phaseolus glabellus Piper

Species of legume

Phaseolus glabellus is a species of flowering plant in the genus Phaseolus. It is native to Mexico, with red flowers.
