= Phaseolus texensis =

Scientific classification
- Kingdom: Plantae
- Clade: Embryophytes
- Clade: Tracheophytes
- Clade: Angiosperms
- Clade: Eudicots
- Clade: Rosids
- Order: Fabales
- Family: Fabaceae
- Subfamily: Faboideae
- Genus: Phaseolus
- Species: P. texensis

Binomial name
- Phaseolus texensis A.Delgado & W.R.Carr

Species of legume

Phaseolus texensis, also known as the Boerne bean, is a perennial species of legume plant in the family Fabaceae which is native to southwestern Texas on the rocky limestone canyons of Edwards Plateau. Alfonso Delgado-Salinas of the University of Mexico and Bill Carr of The Nature Conservancy of Texas described it as a new species in 2007 and recommended it be treated as vulnerable due to its rarity and the amount of human activity in its locality.
