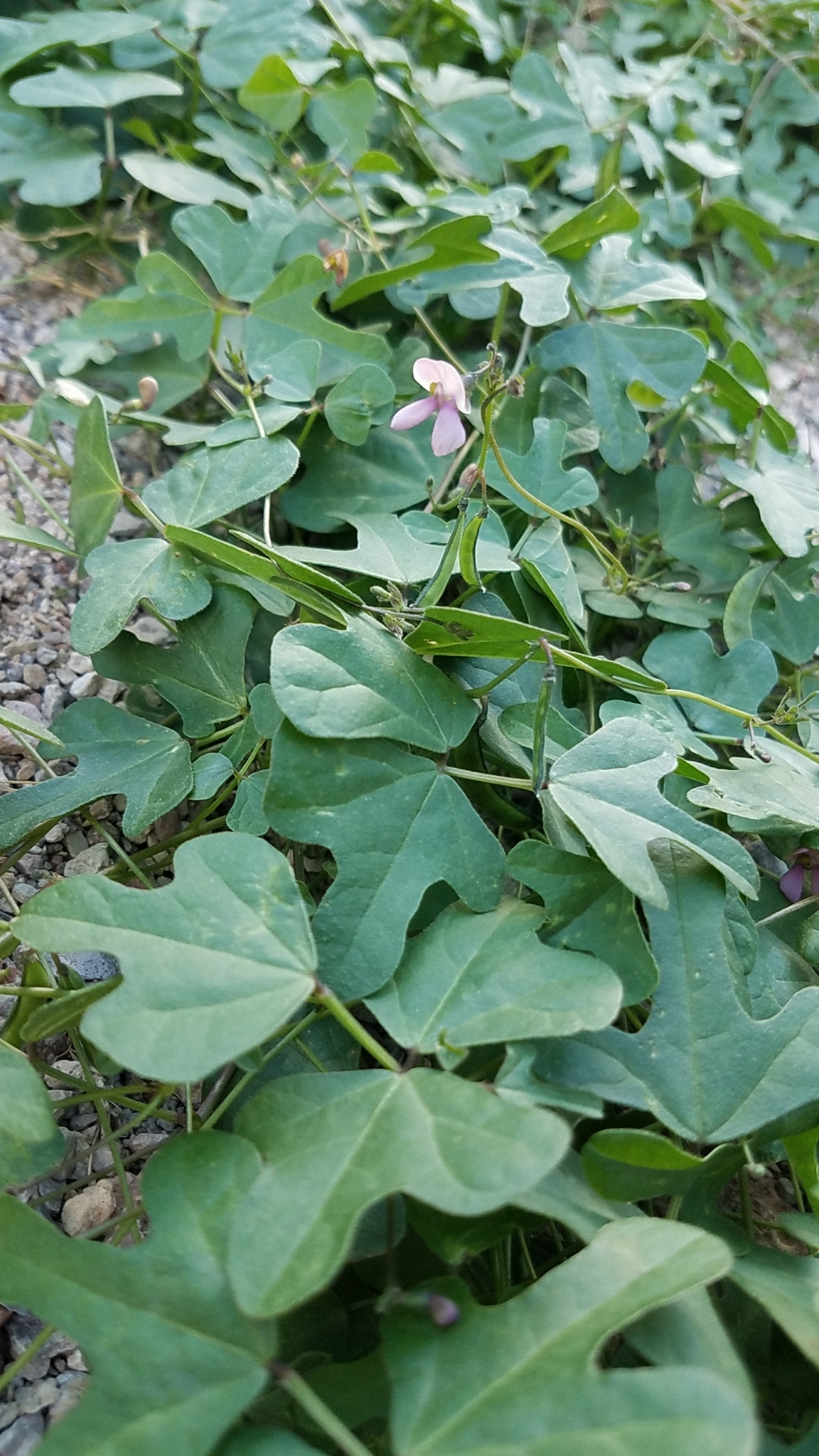
- Phaseolus filiformis from Ensenada, MX-BN, MX

Scientific classification
- Kingdom: Plantae
- Clade: Embryophytes
- Clade: Tracheophytes
- Clade: Angiosperms
- Clade: Eudicots
- Clade: Rosids
- Order: Fabales
- Family: Fabaceae
- Subfamily: Faboideae
- Genus: Phaseolus
- Species: P. filiformis

Binomial name
- Phaseolus filiformis Benth.

Synonyms
- Phaseolus wrightii

= Phaseolus filiformis =

Species of legume

Phaseolus filiformis is a species of wild bean native to the southwestern United States and northern Mexico. Its common names include slimjim bean, slender-stem bean, Wright's Limabean and Wright's phaseolus. This plant resembles other beans in appearance, with leaves composed of lobed triangular leaflets and pink pea-like flowers. The small bean pods are 2.5 to 3.5 cm long and less than 1 cm wide.

== Gallery ==
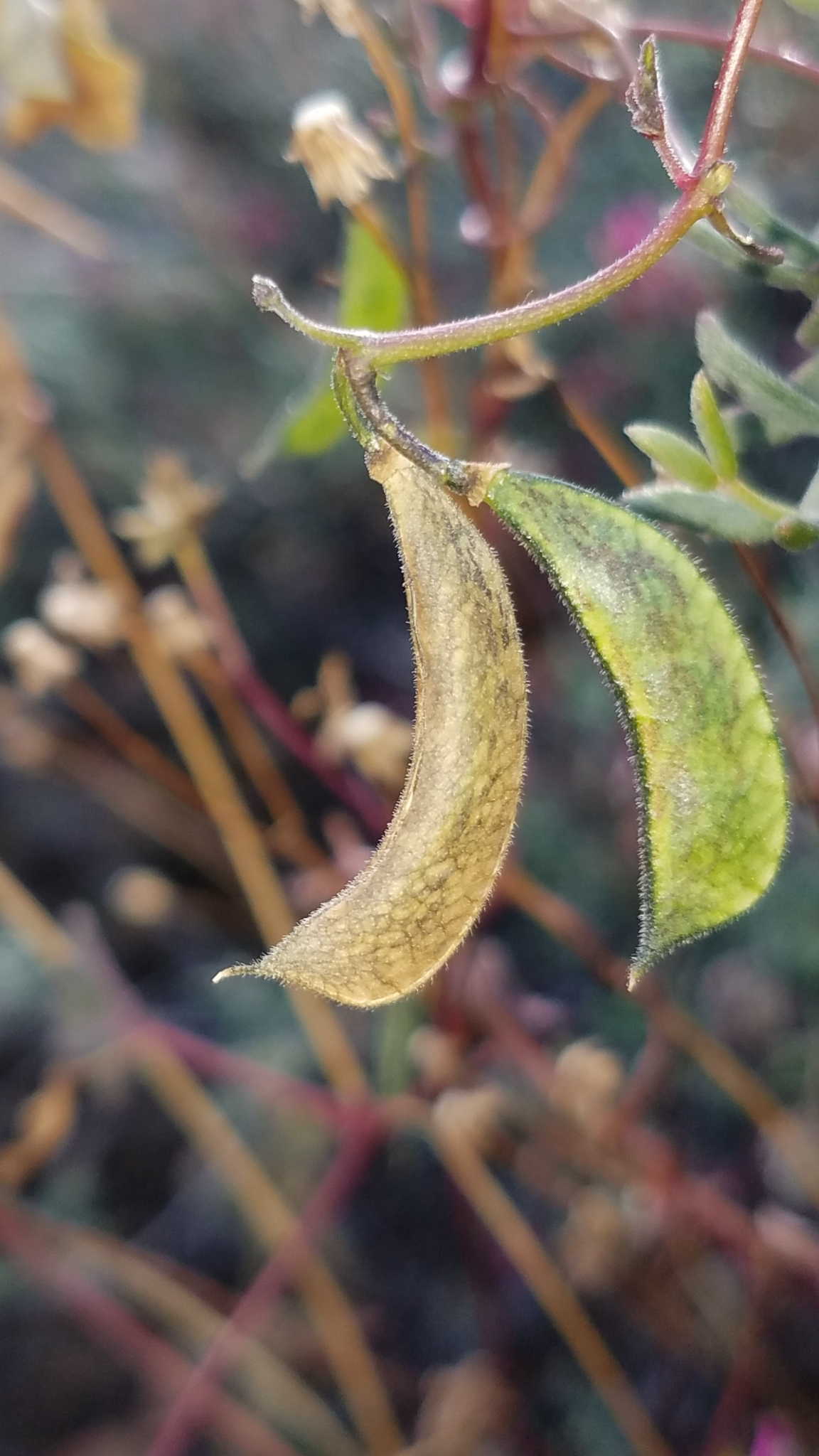
Phaseolus filiformis from Mulegé, MX-BS, MX

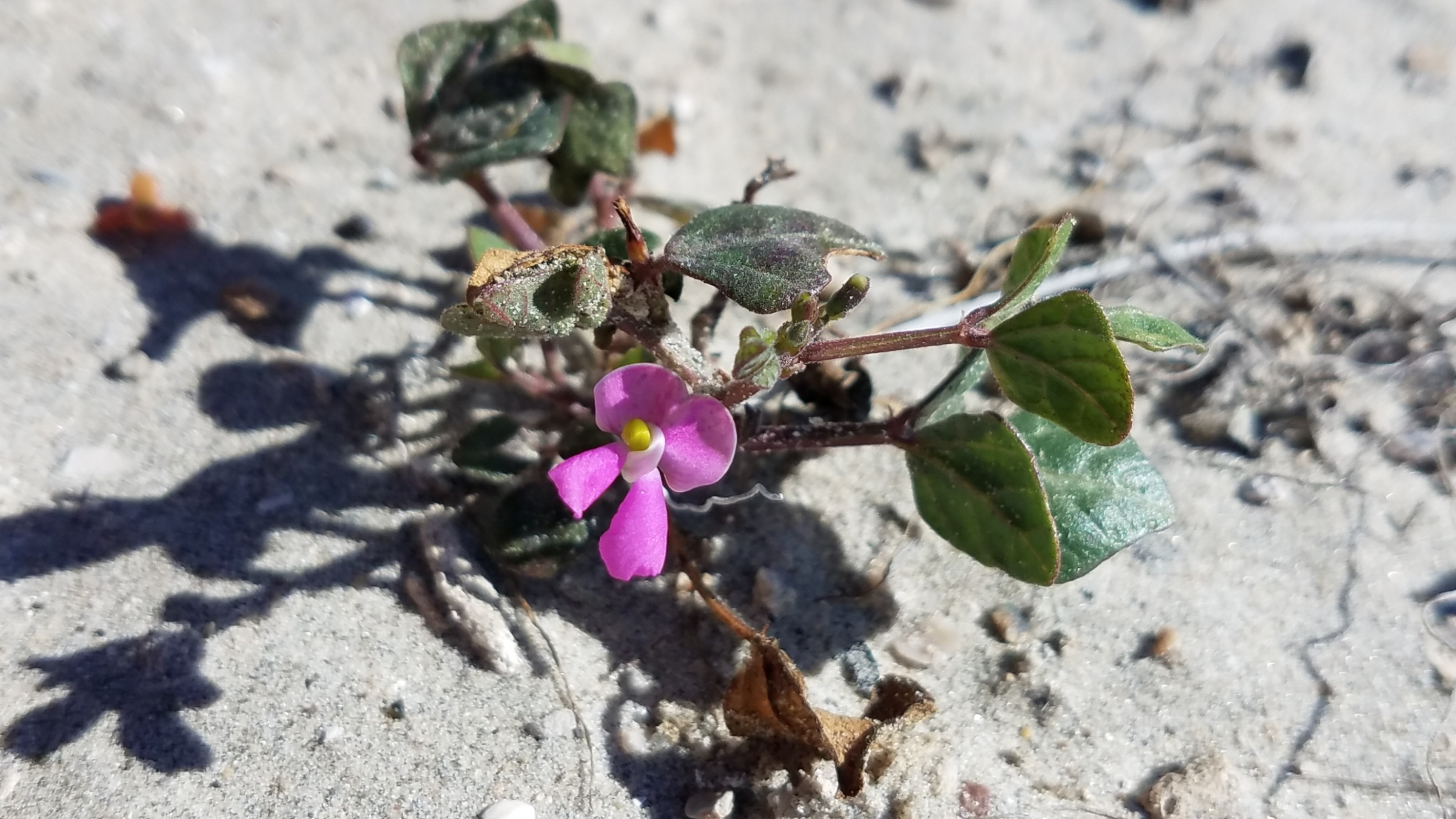
Phaseolus filiformis from Estero de Loa Bocana, B.C.S., Mexico
