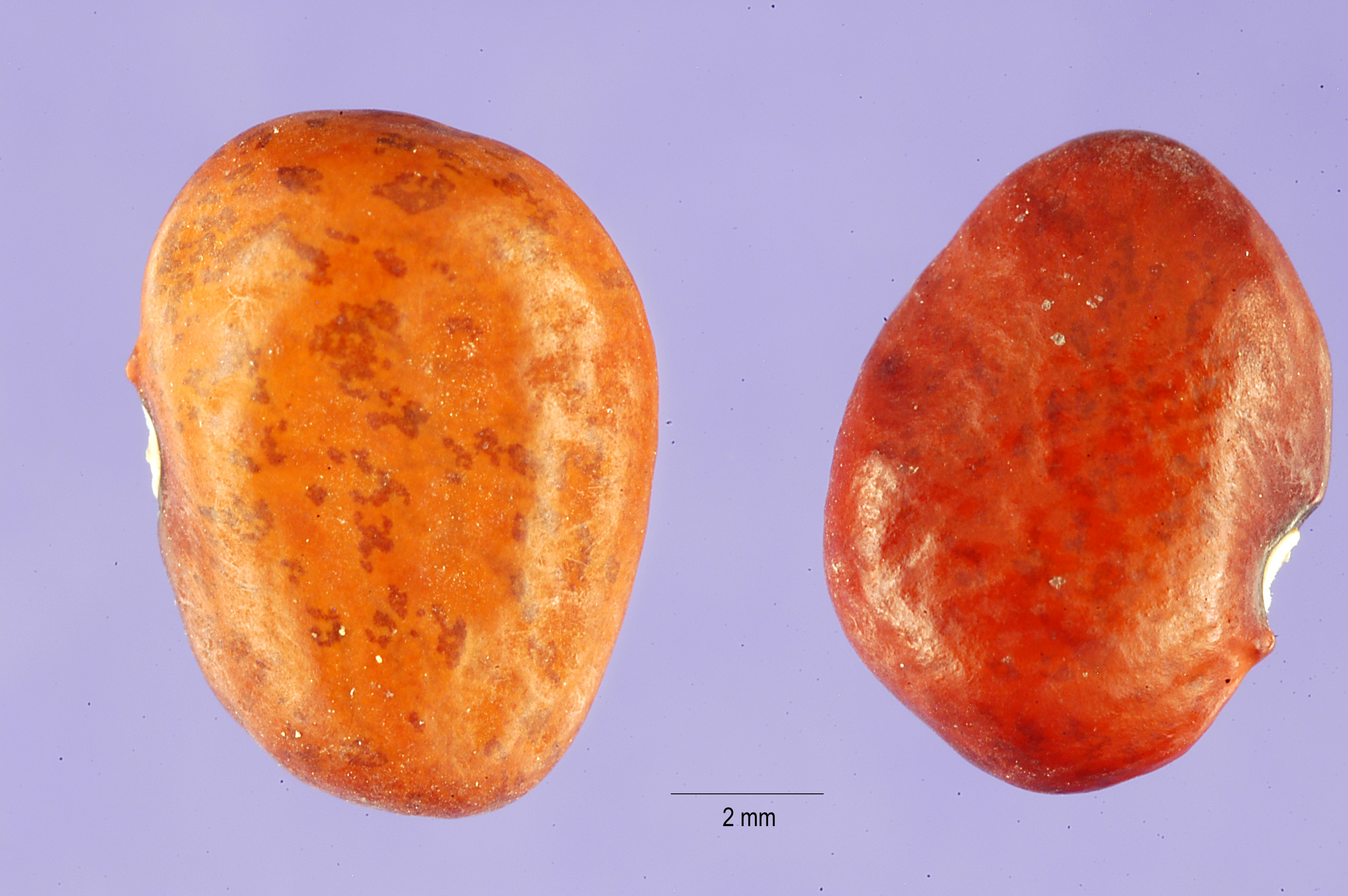

Conservation status
- Least Concern (IUCN 3.1)

Scientific classification
- Kingdom: Plantae
- Clade: Tracheophytes
- Clade: Angiosperms
- Clade: Eudicots
- Clade: Rosids
- Order: Fabales
- Family: Fabaceae
- Subfamily: Faboideae
- Genus: Phaseolus
- Species: P. acutifolius

Binomial name
- Phaseolus acutifolius A.Gray

Synonyms
- Phaseolus acutifolius var. tenuifolius A.Gray; Phaseolus acutifolius var. acutifolius A.Gray; Phaseolus acutifolius var. latifolius A.Gray

= Phaseolus acutifolius =

Species of plant

Phaseolus acutifolius, also known as the tepary bean, is a legume native to the southwestern United States and Mexico that has been grown there by the native peoples since pre-Columbian times. It is more drought-resistant than the common bean (Phaseolus vulgaris) and is grown in desert and semi-desert conditions from Arizona through Mexico to Costa Rica. The water requirements are low. The crop will grow in areas where annual rainfall is less than 400 mm (16 in).

== Description ==
The tepary bean is an annual and can be climbing, trailing, or erect, with stems up to 4 m (13 ft) long. The specific epithet, acutifolius, is derived from Latin acutus 'pointed, acute', and -folius '-leaved'. A narrow leafed, variety tenuifolius, and a broader leafed, variety latifolius, are known. Domestic varieties are derived from latifolius. Observation of "a limited number" of wild specimens suggested that "the flowers concur with the summer rains, first appearing in late August, with the pods ripening early in the fall dry season, most of them in October". The beans can be of nearly any color. There are many local landraces. Beans vary in size but tend to be small. They mature 60 to 120 days after planting.

Other names for this native bean include Pawi, Pavi, Tepari, Escomite, Yori mui, Yorimuni and Yori muni. The name tepary may derive from the Tohono O'odham phrase tʼpawi or "It's a bean". The name for a small bean was recorded in the 17th century, in the now extinct Eudeve language of northern Mexico, as tépar (accusative case, tépari). Names that contain yori in them typically refer to non-native species of beans, since those names mean "non-Indian person's bean".

== Cultivation ==
=== History ===
Tepary beans have been grown by Native Americans for thousands of years; cultivated beans have been found dating to 500 BCE in the Tehuacán Valley in Mexico. Tepary beans appear to have been domesticated in a single event in northern Mexico, based on genetic evidence.

The Sand Papago (Hia C-eḍ O'odham) were mainly hunter-gatherers but cultivated tepary beans and other crops when moisture made it possible for them to do so. In 1912, ethnographer Carl Lumholtz found small cultivated fields primarily of tepary beans in the Pinacate Peaks area of Sonora. In the Pinacate, with an average annual precipitation of 75 mm (3.0 in) and temperatures up to 48 °C (118 °F), Tohono O'Odham and Mexican farmers utilized runoff from sparse rains to grow crops. In the 1980s, author Gary Paul Nabhan visited this area, and found one farm family taking advantage of the first large rain in six years, planting seeds in the wet ground and harvesting a crop two months later. The most successful crops were tepary beans and a drought-adapted squash. Nabhan calculated that the cultivation in the Pinacate was the most arid area in the world where rain-fed agriculture is practiced.

The tepary bean was a major food staple of natives in the Southwestern United States and northern Mexico. In addition to being grown in floodplains, it was often grown alongside squash and corn. Growing these plants together, known as Three Sisters agriculture, enhances their growth and provides more balanced nutrition.

In the United States, the tepary bean was introduced to Anglo farmers in the 19th century by Tohono O'Odham (Papago) farmers. The Native American method of planting in the American Southwest was to plant three to five seeds in hills 6 to 8 feet (1.8 to 2.4 m) apart. Beans were planted in arroyos that had been recently flooded by summer rain.

=== Cropping systems ===
The tepary bean is traditionally sown at the start of the monsoon season, typically from mid-June to mid-July. With access to irrigation, earlier seeding dates are possible. Seeds are generally planted 2.5–4 cm deep. Row spacing ranges from 30–40 cm in small-scale plantings and 70―80 cm in larger operations. Seeding rates typically vary between 25 and 35 kg per hectare, with approximately 9000 seeds per kilogramm.

Tepary beans are very drought-tolerant. Nevertheless Germination requires wet soil. Once established, the plants will flourish in dry conditions. Excessive water will impair crop development and may lead to increased vegetative growth at the expense of seed yield. Thus irrigation after germination is commonly limitied to situations, where plants show significant water stress. The Tepary bean has a positive impact on soil fertility, as it is forming symbiosis with nitrogen-fixing bacteria (Rhizobia), like other legumes. The Rhizobia fix nitrogen gas (N_{2}) from the atmosphere, turning it into a plant-available form. This property of adding nitrogen to the soil makes legumes attractive for low-input systems. Plant residues after harvest can contain up to 150kg nitrogen per hectar.

Fertilization and pest control are similar to those for the common bean. Agroscope, the Swiss center for agricultural research, indicates fertilization of no nitrogen, 8.7kg phoshorus and 58.1kg potassium per hectar for the common bean. Diseases in most beans include Anthracnose, Blights and rots, as well as Rust.

Beans can be harvested after 60 to 120 days, depending on environmental conditions. Harvest can be done via cutting, windrowing and then combining. Yields generally range from 400–800 kg/ha in drylands and 900–1700 kg/ha in systems with irrigation (adjusted to the needs of the tepary bean). Reports on historical tepary bean yields in the United States vary widely. In arid regions, yields recorded between 1910 and 1975 ranged from under 200 kg/ha to just over 2,000 kg/ha, depending on irrigation availability. In contrast yields may surpass 4,630 kg/ha in regions with less extreme climate conditions.

=== Relevance ===
Northwestern Mexico is the primary area of production for tepary beans. The tepary is also cultivated in many countries in Africa, Australia, and Asia. In India, tepary beans are an ingredient in the snacks "bhujia" and Punjabi Tadka by Haldiram's.

As of 2015, the International Center for Tropical Agriculture in Colombia is testing crossbreeds of the tepary bean and common bean, in order to impart the tepary's drought and heat resistance. The latter could be especially helpful given climate change's effects on agriculture.

=== Heat stress resistance ===
P. acutifolius is a sister species of P. vulgaris; genomic studies estimate that it diverged from P. vulgaris around ~2.1 Mya. As part of this divergence, the species duplicated genes that supported resistance to abiotic stress in arid zones: binding genes coding for chitin-binding proteins, kinase activity, cell wall macromolecule catabolic/metabolic processes and amino sugar metabolism (Example: Glucosamine). The tepary bean uses these amino sugars as a protection mechanism against heat stress, preventing proteins within the body of the plant from starting a denaturation process.

A study, published in 2021, showed that when the tepary bean plant is exposed to high temperatures there is a negative regulation of the genes involved in cell division (GO:0048523; GO:0045786) and a positive regulation of those involved in arrest (GO: 0007050). This suggests that above 37°C cells that are in the cell division cycle is arrested in the G1-S phase; it seems that this is done by the cell in order to avoid the development of organism and thus conserve energy. Trehalose synthesis genes were also found to be overexpressed; trehalose is a sugar that in high concentrations is capable of protecting cell membranes and proteins from the denaturation process. A synteny analysis revealed that there is an intrachromosomal rearrangement on chromosomes 2 and 9; this could be a factor in the difficulties in developing fertile hybrids.

Not only are tepary beans more resistant to heat and drought stress than common beans (Phaseolus vulgaris), they are also reported to tolerate mild subzero temperatures better under field conditions. The survival rate of tepary beans seven days after mild frost events has been found to be significantly higher than that of common beans.

== Nutritional aspects ==
The nutritional characteristics of the tepary bean are generally similar to those of the common bean (Phaseolus vulgaris). Like other legumes, tepary beans are rich in protein. They contain 15–32% protein, 0.9–1.7% fat, and 65.3–69.1% carbohydrate. Total dietary fiber content ranges from 18–21%, of which 0.5–1% are considered soluble fiber and 17–20% insoluble fiber. Tepary beans contain higher levels of essential minerals than common pinto beans, with levels 10–40% higher. The exceptions are iron, nickel and selenium, for which the content is the same in both types of bean. There are also differences in the levels of some trace elements, with tepary beans having lower levels of rubidium but higher levels of bromine and strontium than pinto beans.

Tepary beans are, however, relatively low in the sulfur-containing amino acids cysteine, methionine, and also tryptophan, likewise as the common bean and other legume crops. In traditional food systems where beans form a dietary staple, these shortcomings are typically balanced by complementary foods such as maize or squash.

Anti-nutritional factors in tepary beans include trypsin inhibitors and lectins, which can interfere with digestion by reducing nutrient absorption in the intestine. Trypsin inhibitor activity is largely inactivated by heat treatment, and lectins in properly cooked beans do not pose nutritional concerns.

== Usage as fodder crop ==
In addition to its use as a dry grain for human consumption, the tepary bean has also been evaluated as a short-duration forage crop suitable for fodder production under drought conditions. For use as fodder crop the aboveground biomass is cut and dried in the same way as is done for the production of other types of hay.

The forage quality of tepary bean was reported to be comparable to that of alfalfa hay and soybean forage, containing about 21% crude protein and roughly 41% neutral detergent fiber (NDF).

Field trials in Virginia, United States, reported dry matter yields of approximately 4.4 t/ha from a single harvest of 59-day-old plants. By comparison, typical alfalfa (Medicago sativa) hay yields in the same region are around 6.7 t/ha per year, though the latter are obtained from multiple harvests during the year.

== Medical uses ==
Research in the United States and Mexico suggests that lectin toxins and other compounds from tepary beans may be useful in chemotherapy for treating cancer. However, further research is needed.
