= Dragon tongue bean =

Young green bean in the species Phaseolus vulgaris

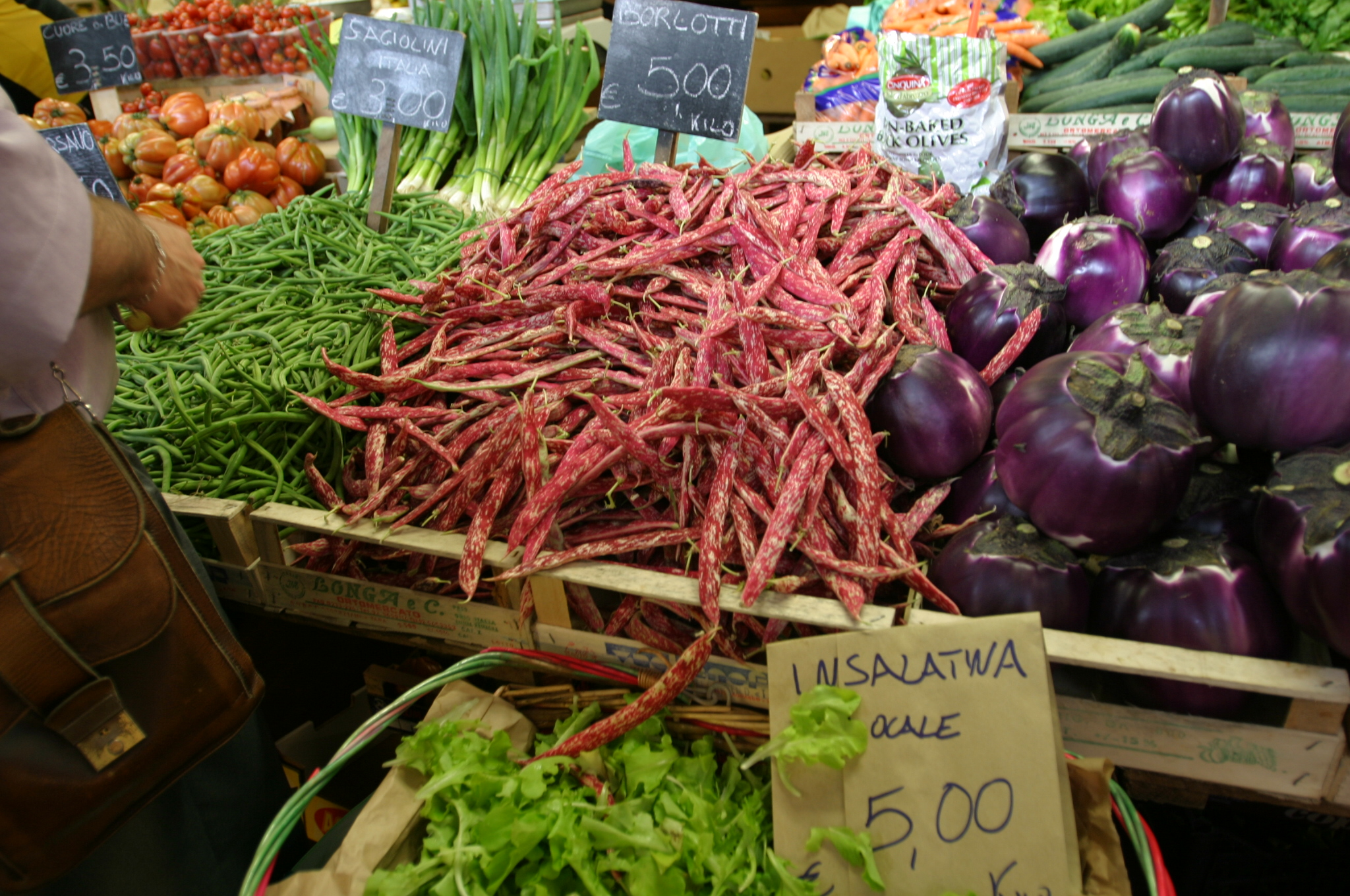

Nutritional value per 132.8 g
- Energy: 0.874456 kJ (0.209000 kcal)
- Carbohydrates: 19.5 g
- Sugars: 1 g
- Dietary fiber: 5.4 g
- Fat: 12.9 g
- Saturated: 1.9 g
- Protein: 6.8 g
Vitamins and minerals
Minerals	Quantity %DV^{†}
Potassium	1% 35 mg
Sodium	31% 716 mg
- ^{†}Percentages estimated using US recommendations for adults, except for potassium, which is estimated based on expert recommendation from the National Academies; Source: Caloriecount.com

Dragon tongue bean, or dragon tongue shelling bean, is young green bean (snap bean) of cranberry bean, pinto bean in the species Phaseolus vulgaris (shell bean).

Other names for this Heirloom Bush yellow wax dwarf bean include Dragon Langerie, Merveille de Piemonte and Meraviglia del Piemonte.

== Characteristics ==
Dragon tongue bean is a flavorful, juicy bean whose seeds are encased in a buffed colorful pod with mottled burgundy patterns throughout the shell's surface. The shelled beans are pale pistachio green in color, their size, petite, and their shape, ovate and slightly curved.

Days to maturation is approximately 55-60 days.

Fully grown plant height is approximately 2-3 feet tall.

Time from flower to bean is approximately 12 to 15 days.

== Growing requirements ==
Soil Temperature required for Germination: 60–85 °F

Seed Depth: 1"

Seed Spacing: 4"

Row Spacing: 18–36"

Fertilizer Needs: Low

== Uses ==
Dragon tongue bean can be harvested, picked and used for their pods as well as for their seeds like a green bean (snap bean) or allowed to mature into a shell bean for using their seeds only.
