= Aphanomyces euteiches =

Scientific classification
- Domain: Eukaryota
- Clade: Sar
- Clade: Stramenopiles
- Phylum: Oomycota
- Class: Saprolegniomycetes
- Order: Saprolegniales
- Family: Leptolegniaceae
- Genus: Aphanomyces
- Species: A. euteiches

Binomial name
- Aphanomyces euteiches Drechsler (1925)

Species of single-celled organism

Aphanomyces euteiches is a water mould, or oomycete, plant pathogen responsible for the disease Aphanomyces root rot. The species Aphanomyces euteiches can infect a variety of legumes. Symptoms of the disease can differ among hosts but generally include reduced root volume and function, leading to stunting and chlorotic foliage. Aphanomyces root rot is an important agricultural disease in the United States, Europe, Australia, New Zealand, and Japan. Management includes using resistant crop varieties and having good soil drainage, as well as testing soil for the pathogen to avoid infected fields.

== Hosts and symptoms ==
Hosts of Aphanomyces euteiches can be annuals or perennials in the legume family, including: pea (Pisum sativum), alfalfa (Medicago sativa), snap bean and red kidney bean (Phaseolus vulgaris), faba bean (Vicia faba), red clover (Trifolium pratense), and white clover (Trifolium repens). Of particular concern is Aphanomyces euteiches f.sp. pisi, which is responsible for pea root rot and is the most economically damaging form of pea root rot. In North America, genetically distinct populations of A. euteiches demonstrate host specificity, but such specificity has not been observed in Europe.

Because A. euteiches is a root-infecting pathogen, primary symptoms occur on roots and stem tissue below the soil line. Infected roots often appear gray and water-soaked, eventually becoming soft and honey-brown or blackish-brown in appearance. Infection causes a reduction in root volume and function, including reduced nodulation, leading to decreased water and nutrient up-take, which lead to above-ground secondary symptoms. Symptoms in the above-ground plant tissue can include chlorosis of the cotyledons and necrosis of the epicotyls and/or hypocotyls, stunting, and wilting of foliage. Some symptoms can differ among hosts. Infected plants and patterns of infection in the field often correspond to areas in the field with poor soil drainage, which can be the result of soil compaction, soil texture (high clay content), or excessive wetness due to irrigation or rainfall. Symptoms are generally similar among infected legumes, however timing and pattern of disease can differ among hosts and between annuals and perennials. In both peas and beans, lesions tend to progress up the plant tissue, starting with the epicotyls and moving to the hypocotyls, eventually extending above the soil. Lesions on pea epicotyls turn black, eventually creating a pinched region above the cotyledons as the result of pinched tissue. Lesions on beans, on the other hand, have a characteristic water-soaked appearance, are grayish-green in color, and are firm to the touch. In alfalfa symptoms include chlorotic cotyledons which may eventually become necrotic.

Although the symptoms caused by A. euteiches can be difficult to distinguish from symptoms caused by other root-infecting plant pathogens (such as Pythium, Rhizoctonia, and Fusarium), there are some distinct differences. Aphanomyces root rot rarely results in seed rot and/or pre-emergent damping-off. The characteristic lesions caused by the different pathogens also differ. Fusarium infection results in black or reddish vascular tissue, and Rhizoctonia infection results in sunken, cankerous lesions.

A. euteiches exhibits no macroscopic signs, but oogonia and oospores can be seen in root tissue with a compound microscope.

== Disease cycle ==
Aphanomyces root rot is an example of a monocyclic disease, causing only one infection cycle per season. This is in contrast to polycyclic diseases, which can infect new hosts and produce multiple disease cycles within a single season. A. euteiches is not usually a saprophyte in nature, but can be grown in culture in the lab.

Although A. euteiches can potentially infect hosts at any point in the growing season, infection usually begins during seedling emergence. The primary source of inoculum is oospores, which can be found either in the soil or in infected plant debris from previously infected host plants. Oospores germinate as a response to chemical signals detected from the roots of new hosts plants. Germination can either be direct or indirect. Either way, infecting begins at the cell in the root tips of the host plant. In direct germination, the oospore produces hyphae which directly penetrate host cells at the plant's root tips. In indirect germination, the oospore produces sporangia which release zoospores. The zoospores then encyst on the host plant cells, and germinate. After direct or indirect germination, coenocytic hyphae of A. euteiches colonize host tissue through inter- and intra-cellular growth. For sexual reproduction, hyphae develop male and female gametangia called, respectively, antheridia and oogonia. Because Aphanomyces euteiches is homothallic the antheridium and oogonium arise from the same hypha and are self-compatible, meaning separate mating types are not needed for sexual reproduction. The antheridium fertilizes an oogonium, which then develops into a single oospore, which is 20-35 micrometers in diameter.

When growing under optimal conditions, an infection of A. euteiches can result in symptoms within 10 days, and oospores can be formed between 7 and 14 days. Oospores become dormant after being formed, and can survive for more than 10 years.

== Environment ==
Aphanomyces is a soil-borne disease, and the entire lifecycle is completed in the host root and surrounding soil. The pathogen A. euteiches does best in warm, wet soil conditions, but can survive at a range of moderate temperatures. Infection is most prevalent when host plants are in the seedling stage, and when temperatures are between 22 and 28 degrees Celsius. Because zoospores require water for mobility, standing water in the soil increases host infection by making it easier for zoospores to move to host cells. After infection, though, the development of symptoms is favored by warm and dry soil conditions.

== Management ==
The most effective management technique available to farmers is the use of disease-resistant cultivars. Resistant cultivars have been identified in alfalfa, bean, pea and red clover. Breeding for resistance has been successful in alfalfa and beans, however in beans it has been difficult to establish resistant cultivars that also meet consumer needs. The efficacy of chemical suppression is dependent on environmental factors such as temperature and soil moisture. Before widespread fungicide use, control consisted mainly of avoiding fields with high disease risk based on a field indexing procedure developed in 1958 by Sherwood and Hagedorn. Management practices should also include good soil drainage and soil testing to avoid infested fields. Crop rotation can be implemented to slow the rate of build-up of A. euteiches, however because oospores can survive for up to 10 years in the soil, rotation is not an effective means of eradicating the inoculum. Therefore, once high levels of A. euteiches have been identified in a field, growers should abstain from planting susceptible hosts in that field.

A study indicates that A. euteiches abundance is less severe when the infected plant also has significant mycorrhizal development. Excessive use of nitrogen and phosphorus fertilizers, and repeated tillage can reduce mycorrhizal development.

In alfalfa, there is evidence that another interaction can occur between A. euteiches and P. medicaginis, another important alfalfa pathogen which causes Phytophthera root rot. In this case, colonization by A. euteiches may make it more difficult for P. medicaginis to take hold.

== History and importance ==
Aphanomyces euteiches was first described by Drechsler in 1925 as the causal pathogen of root rot in peas. At the time, the disease had plagued Wisconsin and the American Midwest, where monoculture was commonplace in pea production for processing, for decades. The pathogen has since been recorded in Europe, Australia, New Zealand, Japan, and throughout the United States, suggesting that the disease may have already been widespread at the time of its discovery.

Pea (Pisum sativum) is the crop where Aphanomyces causes the greatest economic damage. Aphanomyces root rot can account for yearly losses of about 10% in the fields where it occurs, and may cause losses of entire fields in conditions that are favorable to the pathogen. In agricultural regions that produce large amounts of susceptible crops and have favorable weather conditions for A. euteiches, careful monitoring is of paramount importance. Such regions include the American Midwest, particularly the Great Lakes region. In areas where peas are grown for processing, widespread Aphanomyces infection can cause processing (canning) factories to relocate, a considerable threat for local economies. In fact, prevalence of Aphanomyces root rot has ultimately shifted pea production in the United States from being predominantly in the Midwest and Eastern parts of the country to drier states such as Idaho, Washington, and Oregon where A. euteiches is still common but conditions are less favorable.

In addition to fresh peas, alfalfa is another crop where Aphanomyces root rot (ARR) causes significant economic damage. Whereas in peas A. euteiches usually occurs alone, in alfalfa it often occurs in conjunction Fusarium and Pythium spp, two other root rot-causing pathogens. Thus although A. euteiches had been known as a pathogen of pea since the 1920s, in alfalfa it was often confused with other pathogens. It was not until the 1980s that scientists from the University of Wisconsin confirmed it as a significant pathogen of alfalfa. Since then, Aphanomyces root rot has been an emerging concern in alfalfa crops in the United States and Canada, and is considered widespread in Wisconsin.

In alfalfa, A. eutiches is especially damaging in conjunction with Phytophthora medicaginis, which causes Phytophthora root rot (PRR) in alfalfa. After initial studies in Wisconsin, A. euteiches was identified as an economically significant alfalfa pathogen in other states as well. In Wisconsin, Iowa and Kentucky it often exceeds P. medicaginis in prevalence in fields where alfalfa is grown. Due to these diseases, conventional advice was to avoid growing alfalfa in any wet soils. However, with the development of ARR- and PRR-resistant varieties, wet soil conditions have become less of a concern for alfalfa production, at least as far as disease pressure is concerned. Today, modern alfalfa varieties are required to have both PRR and ARR resistance.
