= Flageolet (disambiguation) =

A flageolet is a wind instrument similar to a recorder.

Flageolet may also refer to:

- Flageolet (organ stop), a pipe organ component
- The flageolet bean, a type of common bean
- A method of playing a string harmonic

== See also ==
- Whistle register, the highest register of the human voice lying above the modal register and falsetto register
