= Rattlesnake bean =

Type of pole bean

'Rattlesnake bean'
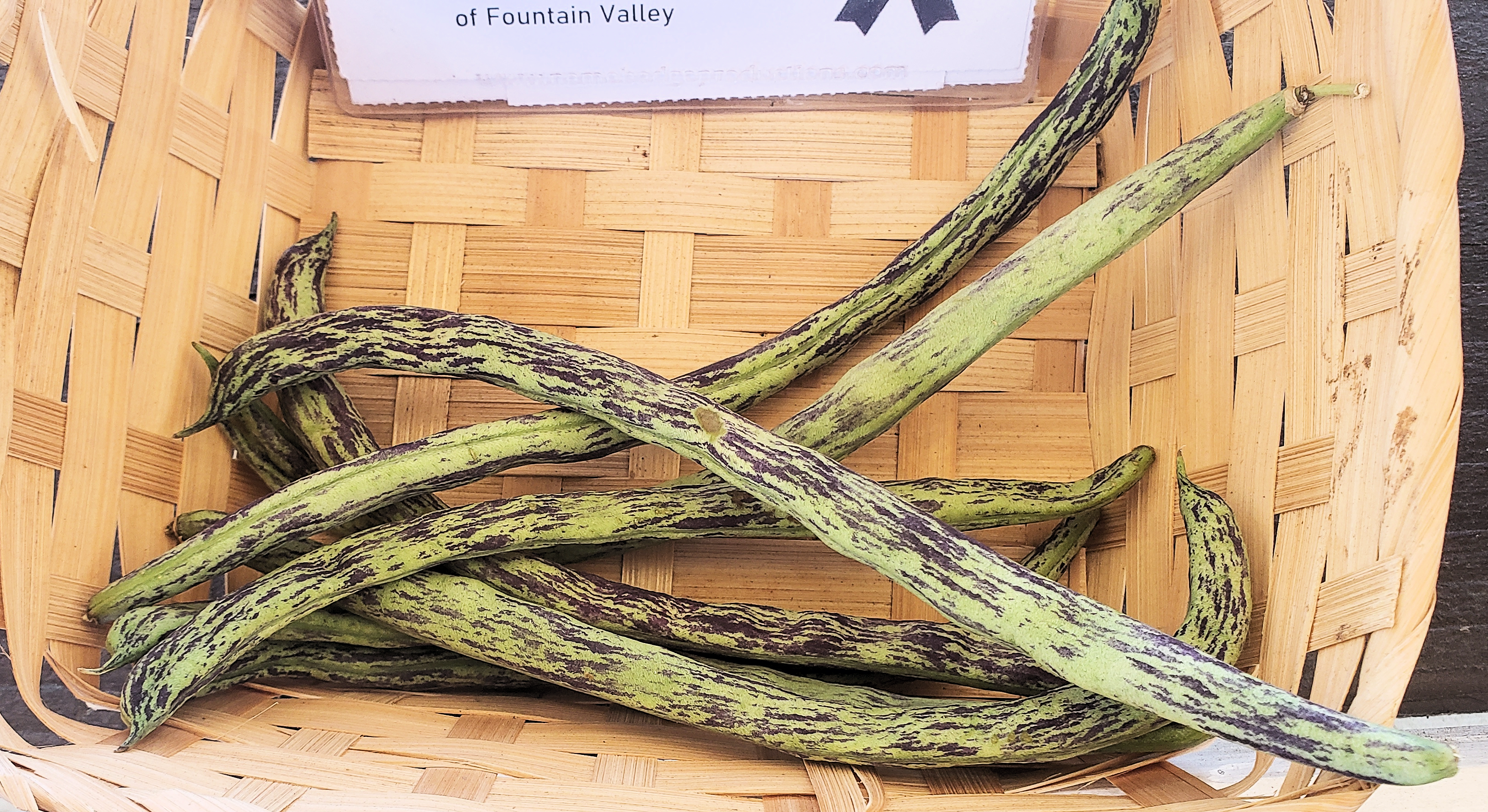
- Species: Phaseolus vulgaris

The rattlesnake bean is an heirloom cultivar of pole bean (Phaseolus vulgaris). The pods are 6 to 8-inches long with purple markings, and the seeds are light brown with brown markings, still visible after cooking. They are named for the snake-like manner in which their pods coil around the vine.

Rattlesnake beans favor hot weather such as in American Southeast and mid-Atlantic, though they are easy to grow elsewhere as well. They have an average to long time from germination to harvest, ranging from 60 to 90 days. They should be harvested frequently for increased yields. Plant grows up to ten feet, producing purple flowers before the pods.

As fresh snap beans, they are sweet-tasting. Cooked dry beans have an intense flavor that combines well with strong spices, making them suitable for chili con carne.
