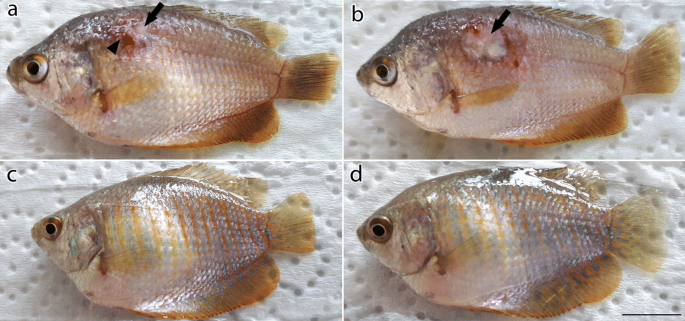

Scientific classification
- Domain: Eukaryota
- Supergroup: Stramenopiles
- Division: Oomycota
- Class: Saprolegniomycetes
- Order: Saprolegniales
- Family: Leptolegniaceae
- Genus: Aphanomyces
- Species: A. invadans

Binomial name
- Aphanomyces invadans David & Kirk, 1997

= Aphanomyces invadans =

Species of single-celled organism

Aphanomyces invadans is a species of water mould. It causes red spot disease, or epizootic ulcerative syndrome (EUS), in many species of fish. In fish, EUS can present as severe tissue necrosis. Prior to its ban in the aquaculture industry, malachite green was used to control A. invadans in the fish farming industry.
