= Calypso bean =

Bean cultivar

Calypso/Orca/Yin yang bean
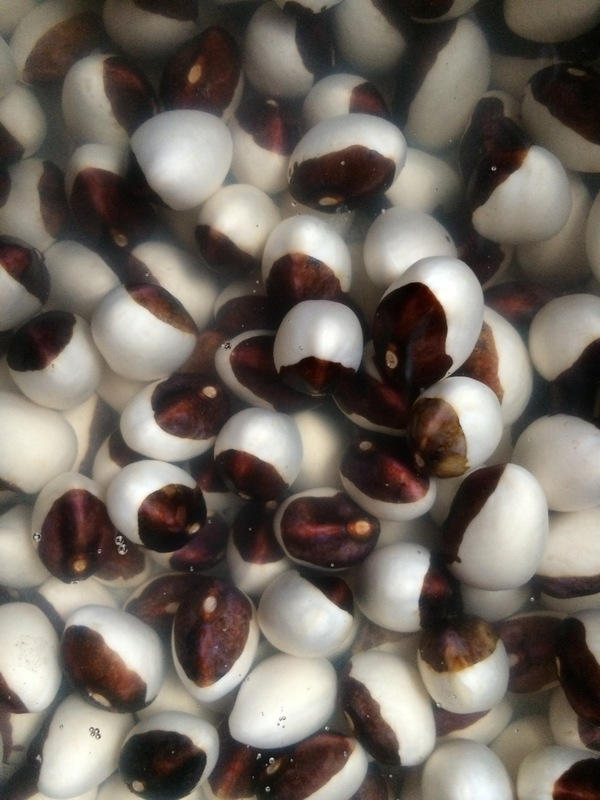

Nutritional value per 100g
- Energy: 1,011.13 kJ (241.67 kcal)
- Carbohydrates: 38.583 g
- Dietary fiber: 23.67 g
- Fat: 0.9167 g
- Protein: 19.833 g
- ^{†}Percentages estimated using US recommendations for adults. Source: Caloriecount.com

The Calypso bean, pickle bean, orca bean, or yin yang bean, is a bean cultivar of the species Phaseolus vulgaris.

== Characteristics ==
=== Plant ===
Calypso beans are a kidney bean hybrid. They grow on a bush-type bean plant that grows up to 15 inches (38 cm) tall. There will be 4 to 5 beans per pod. 70 to 90 days from seed for harvest. The beans are small, 3/8 inch (1 cm) long, but plump.

=== Colors of seed ===
Calypso beans are best known for the distinctly colored variety, with a striking contrast of black and white. The beans are half black, half white, with one or two black dots in the white area, though there is also a red and white variety.

== Uses ==
When young, the pods can be harvested as a green bean. But when full-grown, they are used as a bean for drying.
