= List of diseases of the common bean =

This article is a list of diseases of common bean (Phaseolus vulgaris).

== Bacterial diseases ==
Bacterial diseases
Bacterial brown spot	Pseudomonas syringae pv. syringae
Bacterial wilt (Murcha-de-Curtobacterium in Portuguese)	Curtobacterium flaccumfasciens pv. flaccumfasciens = Corynebacterium flaccumfaciens subsp. flaccumfaciens
Common bacterial blight (Crestamento-bacteriano-comum in Portuguese)	Xanthomonas campestris pv. phaseoli = Xanthomonas axonopodis pv. phaseoli
Fuscous blight	Xanthomonas campestris pv. phaseoli
Halo blight	Pseudomonas syringae pv. phaseolicola
Wildfire	Pseudomonas syringae pv. tabaci

== Fungal diseases ==
Fungal diseases
Mofo-branco in Portuguese	Sclerotinia sclerotiorum
Podridão-radicular-de-Rhizoctonia in Portuguese	Rhizoctonia solani
Podridão-radicular-seca in Portuguese	Fusarium solani
Murcha-de-fusário in Portuguese	Fusarium oxysporum f.sp. phaseoli
Podridão-cinzenta-do-caule in Portuguese	Macrophomina phaseolina
Podridão-do-colo in Portuguese	Sclerotium rolfsii
Mela or Murcha-da-teia-micélica in Portuguese	Thanatephorus cucumeris
Anthracnose of common bean (Antracnose do feijoeiro comum in Portuguese)	Colletotrichum lindemuthianum
Mancha-angular in Portuguese	Phaeoisariopsis griseola
Ferrugem do feijoeiro comum in Portuguese	Uromyces appendiculatus
Sarna	Colletotrichum dematium f. truncatum
Oídio do feijoeiro comum in Portuguese	Erysiphe polygoni

== Nematodes, parasitic ==
Nematodes, parasitic
Lesion (Nematóide das lesões)	Pratylenchus brachyurus
Root-knot (Nematóide das galhas)	Meloidogyne incognita
Root-knot (Nematóide das galhas)	Meloidogyne javanica

== Viral diseases ==
Viral diseases
Common mosaic (Mosaico-comum in Portuguese)	Genus Potyvirus, Bean common mosaic virus (BCMV)
Golden mosaic (Mosaico-dourado in Portuguese)	Genus Begomovirus, Bean golden mosaic virus (BGMV)
