= Bolita bean =

Variety of the common bean (Phaseolus vulgaris)

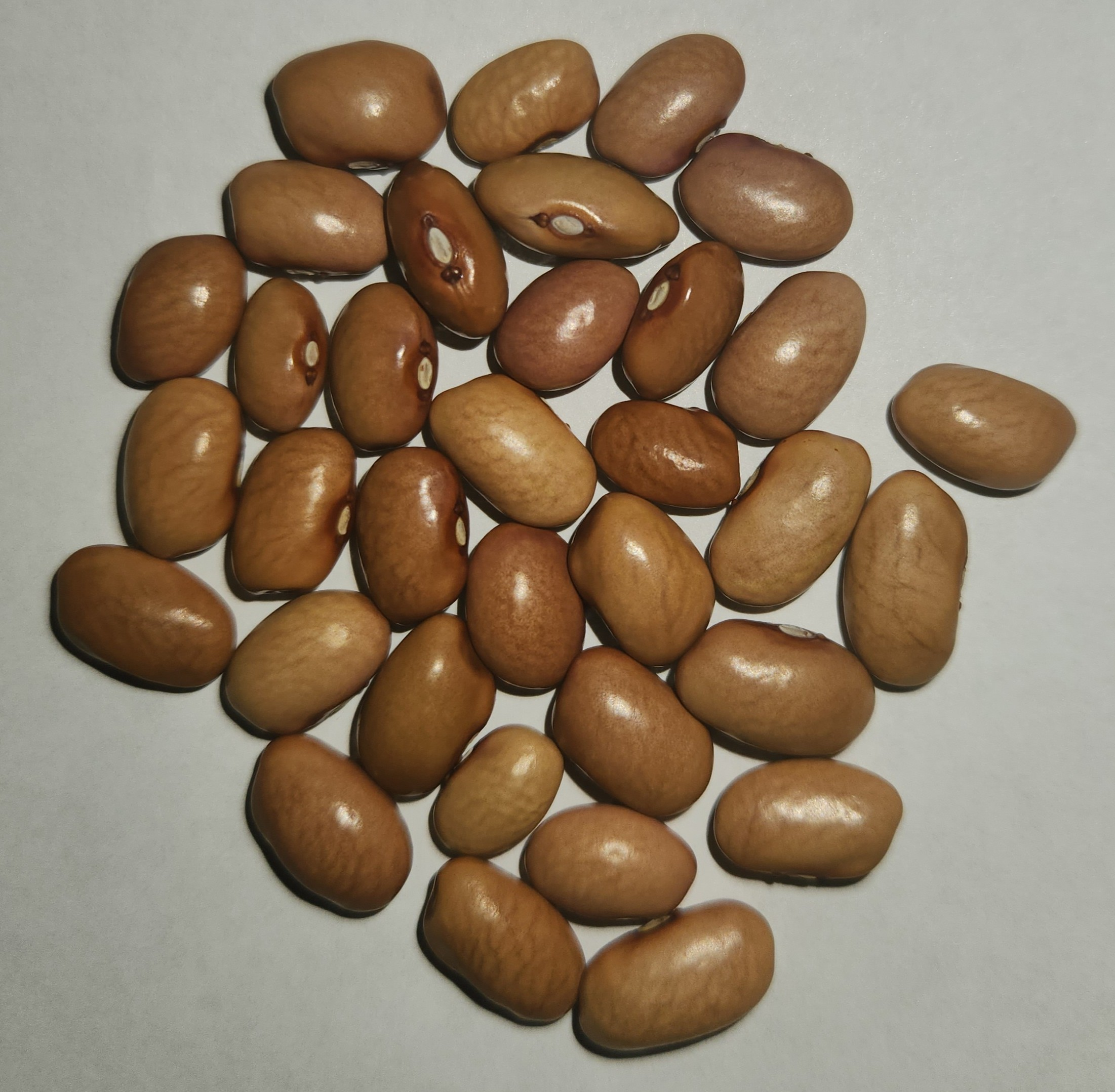
- Bolita beans in front of a white backdrop
- Species: Phaseolus vulgaris (L.)
- Origin: New Mexico and Colorado

The bolita bean is an heirloom variety of common bean (Phaseolus vulgaris) endemic to New Mexico and southern Colorado. It is a small, round, and sweet bean that is traditional to New Mexican and southwestern cuisine.

== Etymology ==
The name comes from New Mexican Spanish, in which they are called frijol bolita, literally "little ball bean", due to their shape and size.

== History and origin ==
=== Prelude ===
Map showcasing the two scientifically accepted locations of the domestication of the common bean

The origins of the common bean have long been a topic of scholarly debate, with Mesoamerica being proposed as a possible origin of domestication. This notion is, however, clouded by a lack of consensus among experts, who remain divided over whether the common bean arose from single or multiple domestication events. It has been noted that two distinct gene pools emerged over time, namely the Andean gene pool, which spanned Southern Peru to Northwest Argentina, and the Mesoamerican gene pool, which extended between Mexico and Colombia.

=== Origin ===
Map of the extent of Ancestral Puebloan settlements

In the Four Corners region, Ancestral Puebloan farmers cultivated various varieties of corn, beans, and squash for over 2,500 years, highlighting the long-standing importance of these crops to the region's inhabitants. However, the oral tradition of the bolita bean suggests that Spanish explorers, who journeyed from other regions of Mexico and the Spanish Empire, are likely to have brought bolita beans with them as they traveled to the Rio Grande Valley, where they settled.

=== Modernity ===
Today, some Spanish descendants of the Rio Grande River in New Mexico and the San Luis Valley of Colorado still grow their own family cultivars of the variety in home gardens, while some specialty retailers have grown a more conventional variety on a small-scale production catering to high-end markets and tourists. However, the bean has become more obscure in recent decades, as older generations that once prized it for its flavor and tolerance of the harsh cold desert climate of southern Colorado and northern New Mexico, have opted to use pinto beans for convenience in traditional recipes. Due to this, it has been put on the Slow Food: Ark of Taste list of culturally intangible foods.

== Description ==
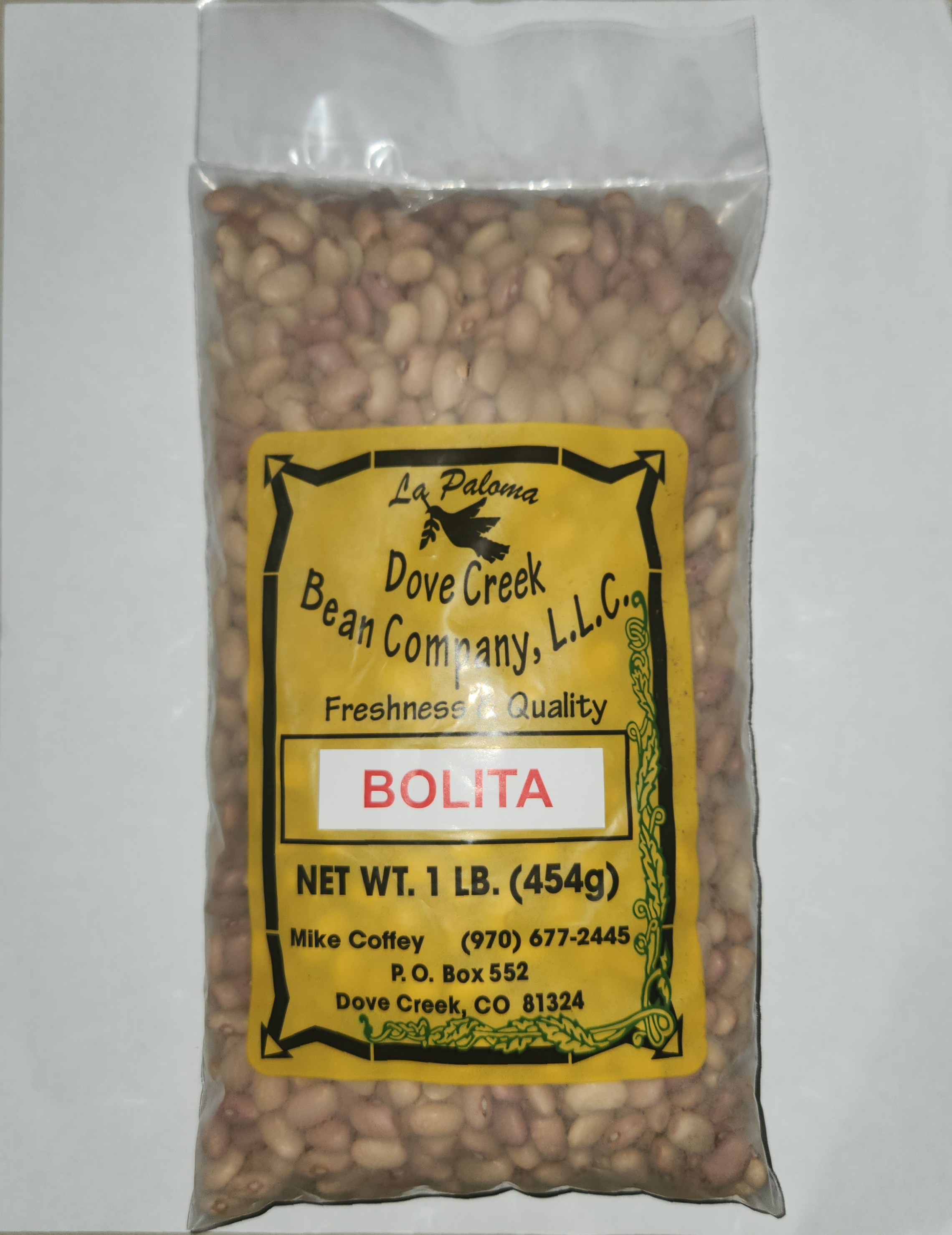
A conventional bag of bolita beans

The bolita bean is small and round, with a creamy texture and a rich, complex flavor. They have thin skin that makes them easy to digest, and they cook faster than pinto beans. They are an excellent source of protein and fiber and are low in fat, making them a healthy choice for a variety of dishes.

=== Culinary uses ===
The beans are versatile and can be used in a variety of dishes. They are a popular ingredient in chili, soups, as refried beans, or as a bean cake. They can also be used any way a pinto or black bean would. The bean is slightly sweeter than that of the pinto bean and has a tendency to absorb the flavor of added condiments and spices more so than other varieties of beans.

=== Cultivation ===
Bolita beans are well adapted to high altitudes and dry-land farming where they are still grown by a few Hispano farms. They require well-drained soil and full sun exposure to grow. The plant grows up to 24 inches in height and produces pods containing 4–6 seeds each, maturing in about 100 days after planting.

=== Landraces ===
- Garcia Bolita – A light-tan-to-brown bolita from Garcia, Colorado, with a climbing "pole" habit.

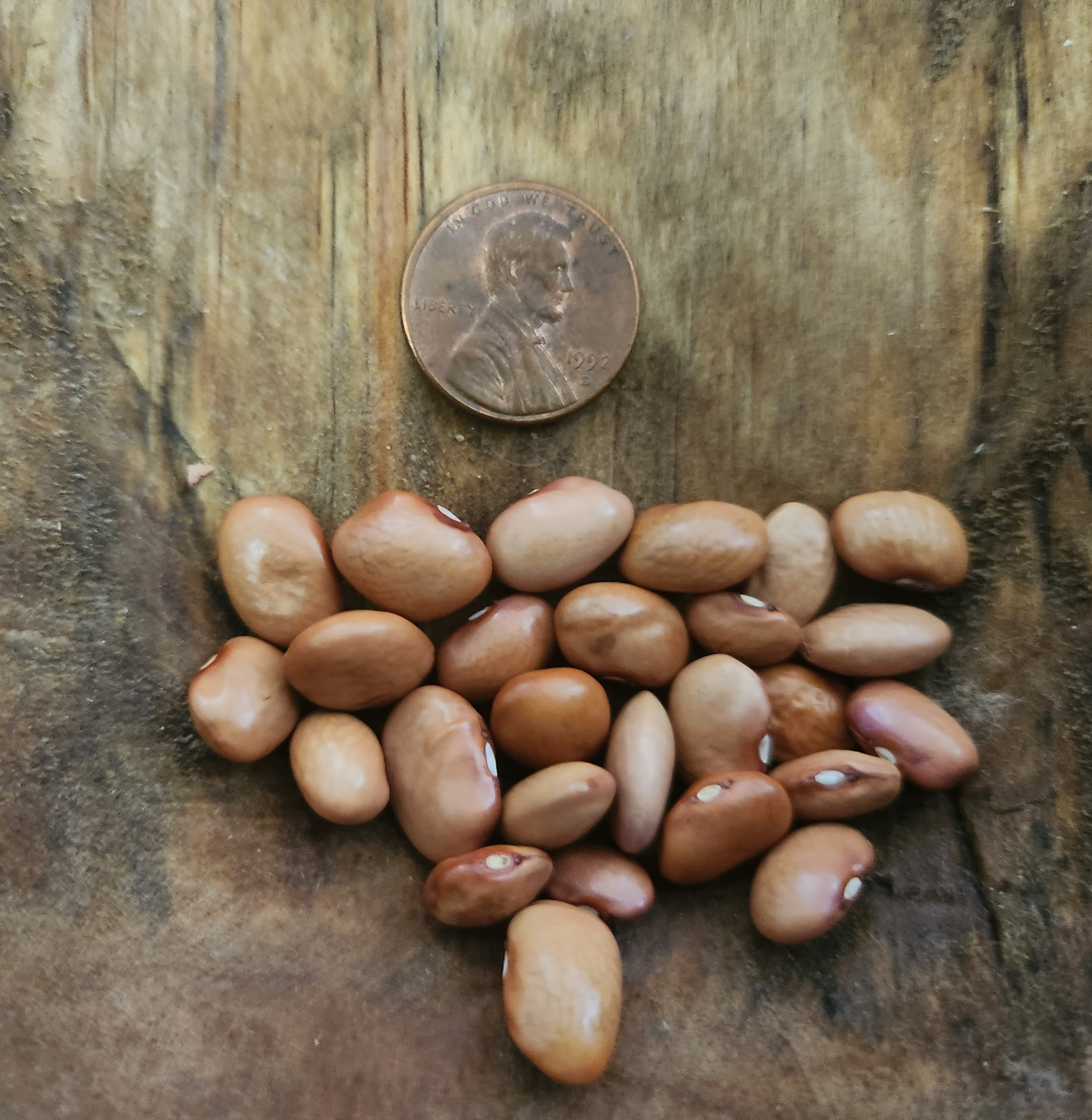
Garcia Bolita beans

- Ojito Bolita – A beige bolita from Ojito, New Mexico, at 2,400 metres (7,800 ft) elevation.

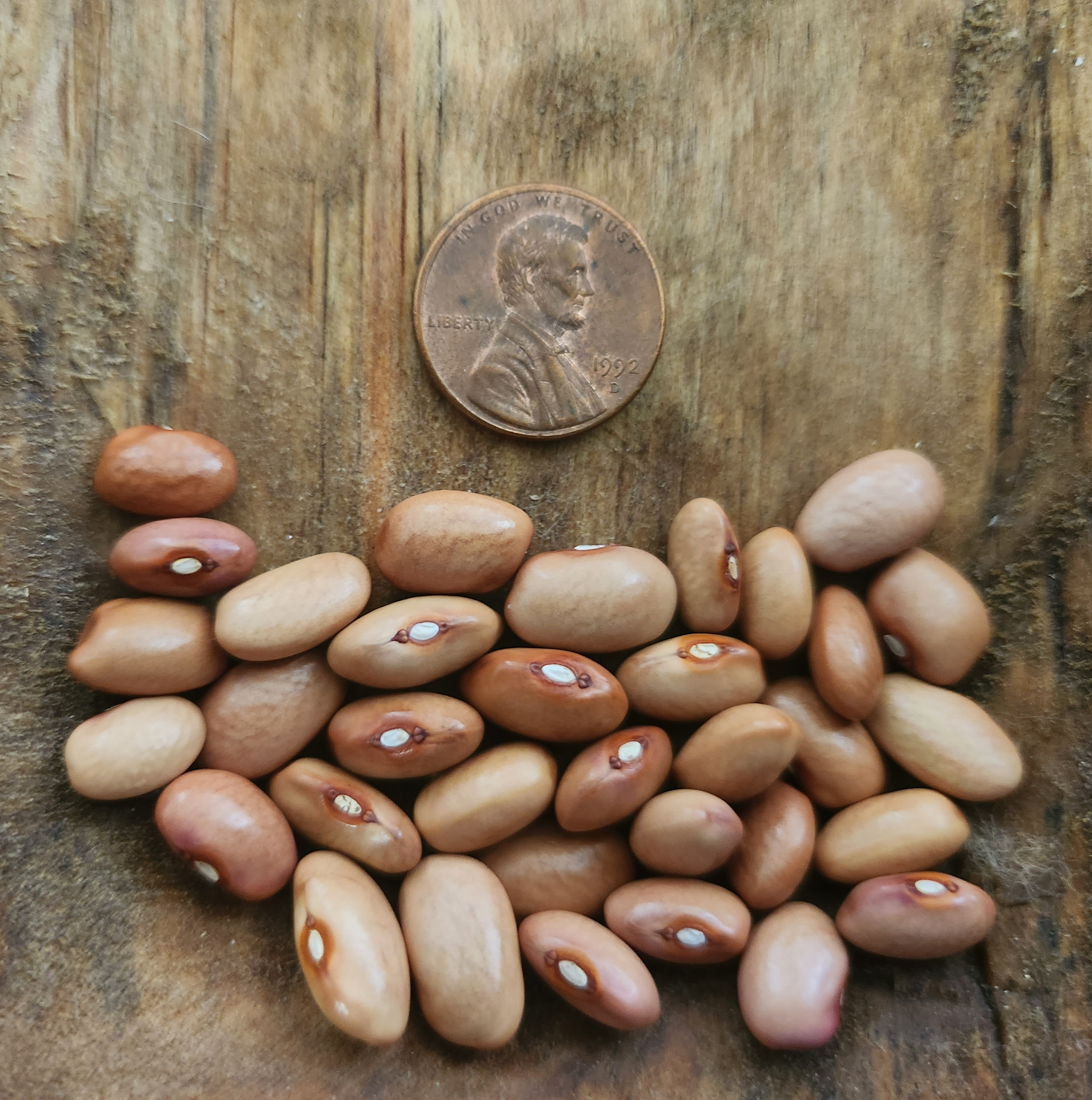
Ojito Bolita beans

- San Luis Valley Bolita – A beige, almost salmon-colored bolita, from the surrounding areas of Alamosa and Conejos county, predominantly round seed phenotype, with a semi-bushy habit.

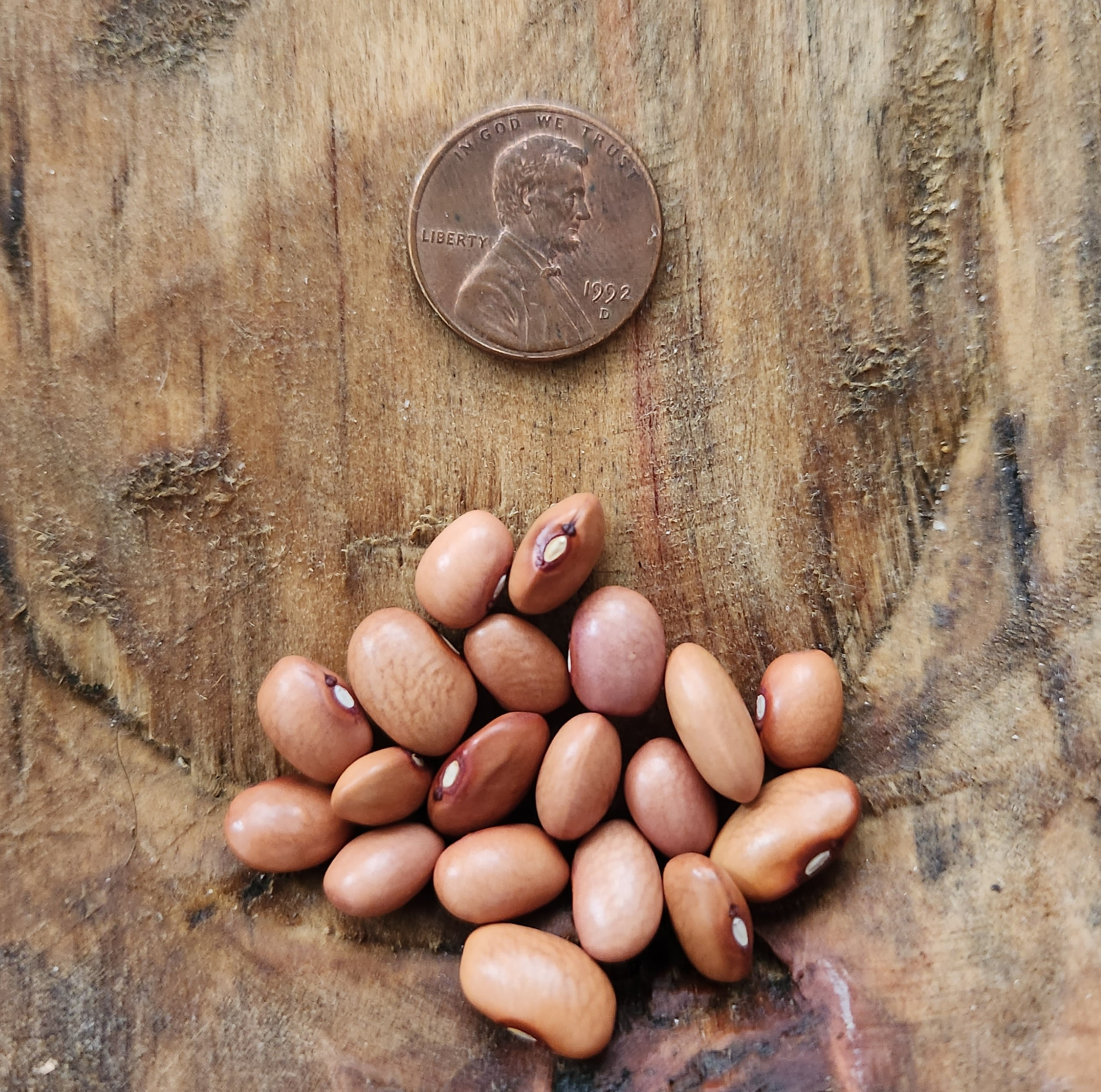
San Luis Bolita beans

== See also ==
- Pinto bean
- Black turtle bean
- New Mexican chile
- Sopaipilla
