= Aphanomyces =

Scientific classification
- Domain: Eukaryota
- Clade: Diaphoretickes
- Clade: SAR
- Clade: Stramenopiles
- Phylum: Oomycota
- Order: Saprolegniales
- Family: Leptolegniaceae
- Genus: Aphanomyces

Species
- about 45

Genus of single-celled organisms

Aphanomyces is a genus of water moulds. As of 2003 there were about 45 described species. Many of these water moulds are known as ecologically important pathogens of species of plants and animals, including fish, crustaceans, and agricultural crop plants. Aphanomyces water moulds are "one of the most important yield-limiting factors in production of legumes and sugarbeet."

Some of these water moulds are host-specific, such as A. iridis, which only infects irises. Others can infest several hosts, such as A. euteiches, which grows on several legumes. The disease that manifests in plants infected with these water moulds is sometimes known simply as Aphanomyces root rot or common root rot.

Species include:

- Aphanomyces acinetophagus
- Aphanomyces americanus
- Aphanomyces amphigynus
- Aphanomyces apophysii
- Aphanomyces astaci – crayfish plague
- Aphanomyces balboensis
- Aphanomyces bosminae
- Aphanomyces brassicae
- Aphanomyces camptostylus
- Aphanomyces cladogamus
- Aphanomyces cochlioides
- Aphanomyces coniger
- Aphanomyces daphniae
- Aphanomyces euteiches
- Aphanomyces exoparasiticus
- Aphanomyces frigidophilus
- Aphanomyces gordejevi
- Aphanomyces helicoides
- Aphanomyces hydatinae
- Aphanomyces invadans – ulcerative mycosis of fish, epizootic ulcerative syndrome, mycotic granulomatosis
- Aphanomyces iridis
- Aphanomyces irregularis
- Aphanomyces keratinophilus
- Aphanomyces laevis – cotton-wool disease of fish
- Aphanomyces magnusii
- Aphanomyces norvegicus
- Aphanomyces ovidestruens
- Aphanomyces parasiticus
- Aphanomyces patersonii
- Aphanomyces phycophilus
- Aphanomyces pisci
- Aphanomyces piscicida
- Aphanomyces polysporis
- Aphanomyces raphani – black root disease of radish
- Aphanomyces salsuginosus
- Aphanomyces scaber
- Aphanomyces sparrowii
- Aphanomyces stellatus
- Aphanomyces volgensis
