= Organic beans =

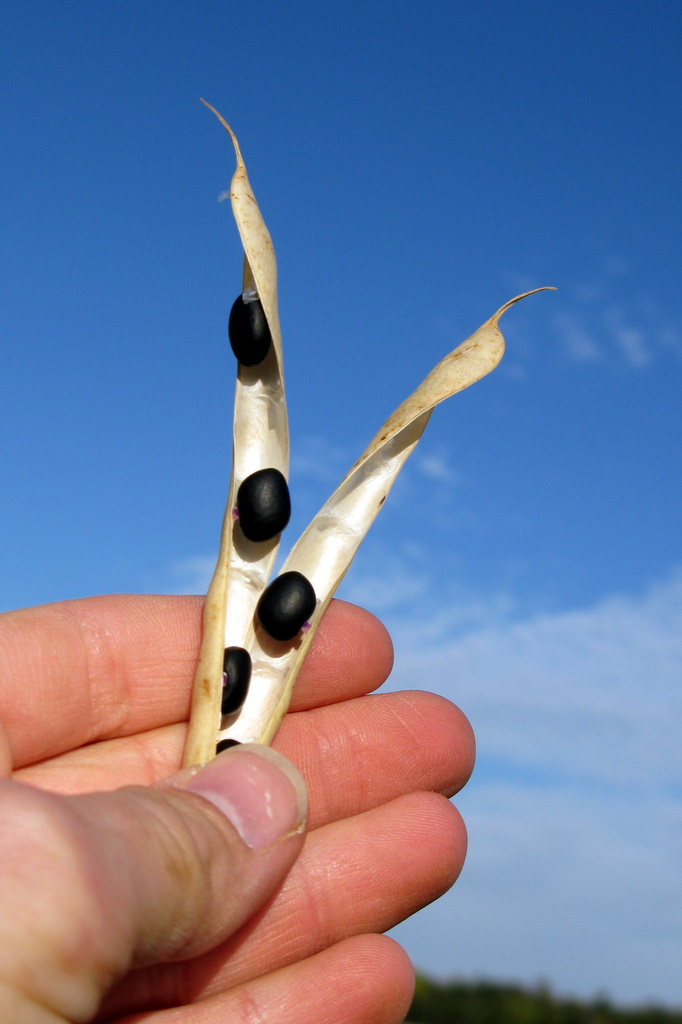
Black beans in the pod

Organic beans are produced and processed without the use of synthetic fertilizers and pesticides. In 2008, over 2,600,000 acres (11,000 km^{2}) of cropland were certified organic in the United States. Dry beans, snap beans, and soybeans were grown on 16,000 acres (65 km^{2}), 5,200 acres (21 km^{2}), and 98,000 acres (400 km^{2}), respectively.

There are three major types of organic beans: dry beans, snap beans (also known as green beans), and soybeans. The mature seeds of dry beans (Phaseolus vulgaris) serve as a protein source in a variety of foods worldwide. Dry beans and snap beans are the same species, although dry beans are distinguished from snap beans (green beans) which are consumed as immature pods. Dry and snap beans also differ from soybeans (Glycine max), in which the seeds are consumed in a variety of processed forms such as tofu, soybean meal, oil, and fermented forms such as miso. Dry beans are divided into classes with a range of seed sizes, colors, and shapes. Examples include black beans, pintos, navy beans, small red beans, and kidney beans. Soybeans are usually divided into two groups, feed-grade and food-grade, with the food-grade including soybeans for processing, "tofu-beans", and edamame, the latter of which is eaten as immature beans.

== Organic certification ==
Labeling for products that meet the USDA-NOP standards

To sell beans as organic in the United States, producers must meet the requirements of the United States Department of Agriculture (USDA) National Organic Program (NOP) under the Organic Food Production Act of 1990. A third-party certifying agency, not part of the USDA and hired by the producer, verifies that the producer has met the minimum requirements and may themselves have additional requirements. Prior to marketing crops as "certified organic", fields must be managed during a three-year transition phase using organic practices (that is, no synthetic pesticides or fertilizers). Detailed record keeping is essential for organic producers and these details are checked annually by the certifying agency who may perform a site inspection.

Certification information for other nations can be found on the Organic certification Wikipedia page.

== Production information ==
=== Organic bean producing regions in the United States ===
Michigan is currently the top organic dry bean producing state in the U.S., accounting for 37% of the area and 47% of the sales. The majority of the area is located in the "Thumb" region of Michigan, with black beans being the most common class produced organically. Colorado and North Dakota are the second and third top producers, respectively, of organic dry beans in the United States.

Washington is the top producer of organic snap beans, followed by Michigan and California. In 2008, the total sales of organic snap beans totaled over 1.4 million dollars.

The value of organic soybeans in 2008 totaled more than $50 million in the U.S., with Minnesota, Iowa, and Michigan accounting for 46% of the total production.

Snap bean harvester

=== Organic bean markets ===
Organically grown beans typically demand a price premium and as a consequence the marketing details differ from the conventional market. Organic bean producers often set up contracts with buyers prior to planting the crop. Buyers may also have special needs to consider when it comes to cleaning and processing beans in certified facilities, thereby making proximity to these certified facilities important.

Organic dry beans from the United States are marketed both nationally and abroad. In 2010, one of the markets for Michigan and Washington produced dry beans was the restaurant chain Chipotle Mexican Grill. Another market is Eden Foods Inc. Organic snap beans are marketed to a variety of companies, such as Gerber and Earth's Best, makers of organic baby food.

Organic soybeans have perhaps the most market potential of the three beans as they can be used as feed for organic animal production and processed into many different products.

=== Pest management ===
Pest management in organic dry beans must be done without the use of synthetic herbicides, fungicides, insecticides, and other pesticides. For this reason, cultural, mechanical, and biological methods are the primary means of keeping pests under control.

==== Major weed pests ====
Rotary hoe

Controlling weeds is the primary cost to many agricultural production systems, including organic beans. Weeds can reduce the emergence, growth, and yield of beans as they compete for light, water, and nutrient resources. Weeds are grouped in many ways, such as by life cycle. In organic beans, the most problematic weeds are those with summer annual and perennial life cycles.

===== Summer annuals =====
Summer annuals are weeds that germinate in the spring or summer, produce seed in the late summer to fall, and then die. Their life cycle is complete in one year.

- Common lambsquarters – broadleaf weed that emerges over an extended period of time, grows rapidly, produces large quantities of seed that can remain dormant in the soil for decades
- Common ragweed – broadleaf weed that emerges over an extended period of time, grows rapidly, and is tolerant to control by heat treatments (like a propane flamer)
- Pigweed (Amaranthus) – broadleaf weed that grows rapidly and is a prolific producer of seed
- Foxtail (Setaria) species – grass weed that grows in clumps and emerges after common lambsquarters and common ragweed
- Crabgrass (Digitaria) species – grass weed with a prostrate growth habit

===== Perennials =====
Perennial weeds can live for multiple growing seasons, usually due to hardy root stocks.

- Canada thistle- broadleaf weed with roots that can grow to a depth 15 feet (4.6 m) in the soil profile. Tillage often promotes the spread of Canada thistle by dispersing segments of the root.
- Perennial sowthistle- broadleaf weed with yellow flowers similar to dandelion that can reproduce by seed or rhizome
- Quackgrass- grass weed that reproduces primarily via rhizome. Seeds are short lived in the soil (2–4 years)

Example of weed management: Several types of tractor-pulled implements such as a rotary hoe and/or one of various types of cultivator/cultivators can be used to mechanically remove weeds from organic fields.

==== Major insect pests ====
Insects are another contributor to yield loss in organic beans. There are several examples of insects that affect organic bean systems including:

Western bean cutworm damage to dry bean

- Bean and potato leafhoppers- sucking insect that causes bean leaves to yellow at the tips and on the edges and can cause stunting
- Western bean cutworm- larvae of this insect feed on the pods of beans reducing yield and quality
- Soybean aphid – sap-sucking insect that can form large colonies on soybean. Soybean aphids can also transmit viruses from plant to plant while feeding.
- Seedcorn maggot – feed on dry and snap bean seed and seedlings. The risk of feeding is increased when temperatures are cool and the soil is wet.

Example of insect management: Bacillus thuringiensis (Bt) is a bacterium that when ingested by susceptible insects is lethal. This product is referred to as a microbial insecticide of which there are four subspecies and over 100 commercial products available for use in organic systems.

==== Major pathogens ====
Pathogens can take the form of fungi, bacteria, viruses, and nematodes. Each can act as a disruptor to plant growth and development and can have negative effects on organic bean yields. Examples of bean pathogens include:

- White mold- a fungus with a wide host range. A symptom of later stages of infection is white cottony hyphal growth on bean stems, leaves, and pods.
- Anthracnose- refers to disease caused by many different fungi. Anthracnose spores can be seedborne or overwinter on leaf litter.
- Soybean cyst nematode (soybean specific)- can cause up to 50% yield loss in soybeans due to root feeding.
- Bean common and soybean mosaic viruses- virus that occurs on bean seed and can have negative impacts on yield and bean quality. Both viruses can be transmitted from plant to plant by aphids.

Example of disease management: The onset of certain diseases, such as white mold, can be reduced by planting in rows wide enough to allow adequate air movement which can reduce humidity and decrease drying time after precipitation events. If plant material is allowed to dry quickly it will not have the 9 to 48 hours of continuous moisture on the leaf surface required for the white mold infection to occur.

==== Organically approved pesticides ====
Some naturally derived chemical products are permitted for use under organic production. All materials have to be reviewed and approved by the Organic Materials Review Institute (OMRI). Examples of organically allowable pesticides that can be used to produce organic beans include:

- Neem oil - Used as an insecticide
- Acetic acid - Used as a herbicide
- Pyrethrum - Broad spectrum insecticide derived from Chrysanthemum
- Bacillus subtilis - Used as a fungicide
- Bacillus thuringiensis - Used as an insecticide

=== Fertility ===
Because synthetic fertilizers are not permitted in organic production systems, fertility must come from sources such as:

- Green manures (cover crops)
- Composts and compost teas
- Livestock manures
- Rock minerals- such as limestone, gypsum, and rock phosphate

== See also ==
- Organic farming
- Integrated pest management
- List of organic food topics
- Organic food
- Organic cotton
- Organic milk
- Organic food culture
