= Appaloosa bean =

Bean cultivar

- Hybrid parentage: Phaseolus vulgaris
- Origin: Washington (U.S. state)

Appaloosa Bean
Nutritional value per 100 g (3.5 oz)
- Energy: 0.745019 kJ (0.178064 kcal)
- Carbohydrates: 53 g
- Dietary fiber: 33 g
- Fat: 0 g
Vitamins and minerals
Minerals	Quantity %DV^{†}
Calcium	29% 378 mg
Iron	22% 4 mg
- ^{†}Percentages estimated using US recommendations for adults, except for potassium, which is estimated based on expert recommendation from the National Academies. Source: http://www.cooksinfo.com/appaloosa-beans

The Appaloosa bean is a cultivar bean variety of the species Phaseolus vulgaris.

== Seed and plant characteristics ==
The Appaloosa Bean (Phaseolus vulgaris), plant grows up to 24 inches (610 mm) tall, with the beans about a 1/2 inch (13 mm) in length. The pods can be eaten as a fresh green bean. Front portion of the bean is ivory colored; the other end is speckled with dark purple–brown. The bean is named after the Appaloosa horses of the Nez Perce people, which have a similar speckled black and white coloration.

The seed was cultivated near the Palouse River in Eastern Washington & Northern Idaho. It is a different cultivar from the New Mexican Appaloosa, though both share similar coloration and are both named after the horse.
