= Aphanomyces cladogamus =

Scientific classification
- Domain: Eukaryota
- Clade: Sar
- Clade: Stramenopiles
- Phylum: Oomycota
- Class: Saprolegniomycetes
- Order: Saprolegniales
- Family: Leptolegniaceae
- Genus: Aphanomyces
- Species: A. cladogamus

Binomial name
- Aphanomyces cladogamus Drechsler, (1929)

Species of single-celled organism

Aphanomyces cladogamus is an oomycete plant pathogen. It causes damping off in vegetables such as peppers.
