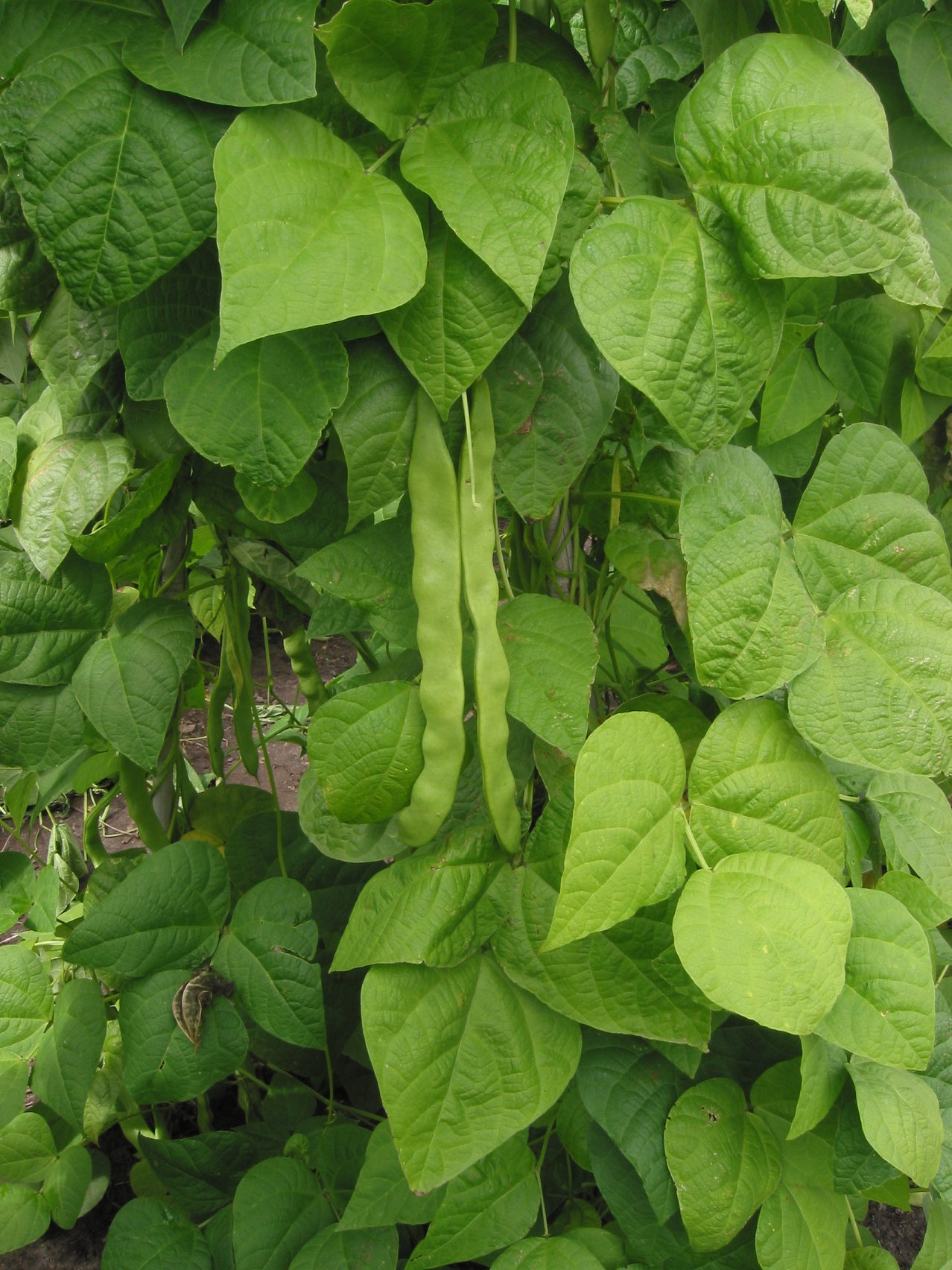
- A flat-podded variety of the common bean

Conservation status
- Least Concern (IUCN 3.1)

Scientific classification
- Kingdom: Plantae
- Clade: Tracheophytes
- Clade: Angiosperms
- Clade: Eudicots
- Clade: Rosids
- Order: Fabales
- Family: Fabaceae
- Subfamily: Faboideae
- Genus: Phaseolus
- Species: P. vulgaris

Binomial name
- Phaseolus vulgaris L.

Synonyms
- Phaseolus aborigineus Burkart; Phaseolus communis Pritz.; Phaseolus compressus DC.; Phaseolus esculentus Salisb.; Phaseolus nanus L.

= Phaseolus vulgaris =

Common bean

Common bean plant

Phaseolus vulgaris, the common bean, is a herbaceous annual plant. Its botanical classification, along with other Phaseolus species, is as a member of the legume family, Fabaceae. It forms a green-leaved vine which produces beans inside of pods.

All wild members of the species have a climbing habit, but many cultivars are classified either as bush beans or climbing beans, depending on their style of growth. In 2022, 28 million tonnes of dry common beans were produced worldwide, led by India with 23% of the total.

The common bean is the most consumed bean species in the world and is native to the Americas. It was domesticated in Mexico, Central America and the southern Andes region some 8000years ago. It has many cultivars.

Raw dry beans contain the toxic compound phytohaemagglutinin, which can be deactivated by boiling the beans for 30 minutes. In addition to the beans, the unripe green pods are used for food. The leaf is occasionally used as a vegetable and the straw as fodder.

== Description ==
Bush varieties form erect bushes 20–60 centimetres (8–20 inches) tall, while pole, or running, varieties form vines 2–3 metres (7–10 feet) long. All wild members of the species have a climbing habit. All varieties bear alternate, green or purple leaves, which are divided into three oval, smooth-edged leaflets, each 6–15 cm (2–6 in) long and 3–11 cm (1–4 in) wide.

The white, pink, or purple flowers are about a centimetre long and have 10 stamens each. The flowers are self-pollinating, which facilitates the selection of stable cultivars. The flowers give way to pods 8–20 cm (3–8 in) long and 1–1.5 cm wide. These may be green, yellow, black, or purple, each containing 4–8 beans. Some varieties develop a string along the pod; these are generally cultivated for dry beans, as green stringy beans are not commercially desirable. The beans are smooth, plump, kidney-shaped, up to 1.5 cm long, range widely in color and are often mottled in two or more colors. The beans maintain their germination capacity for up to five years.

Like most Phaseolus species, the genome has 11 chromosomal pairs (2n = 22). The genome is one of the smallest in the legume family at 625 Mbp per haploid genome.

Raw or undercooked beans contain a toxic protein called phytohaemagglutinin.

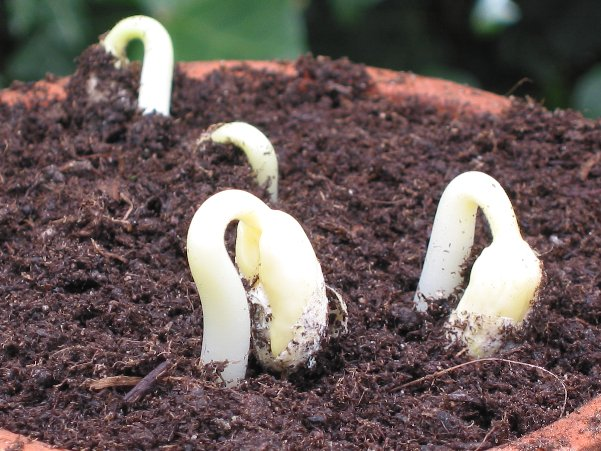
Beans germinating

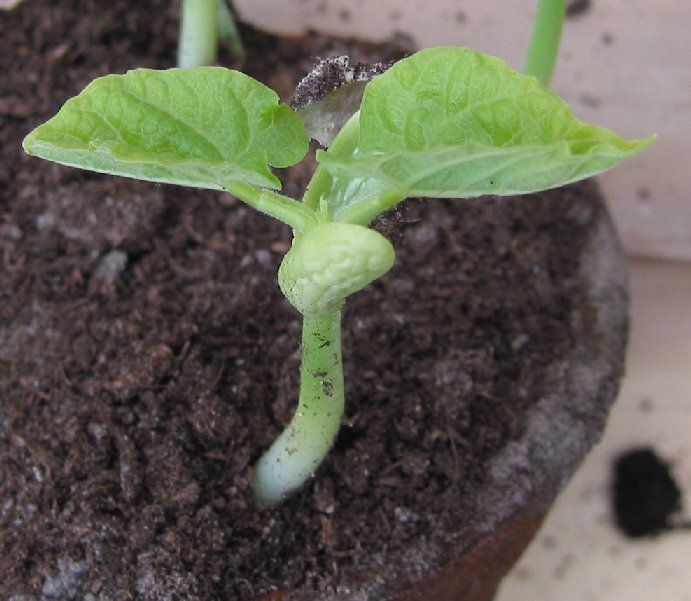
Beans sprouting

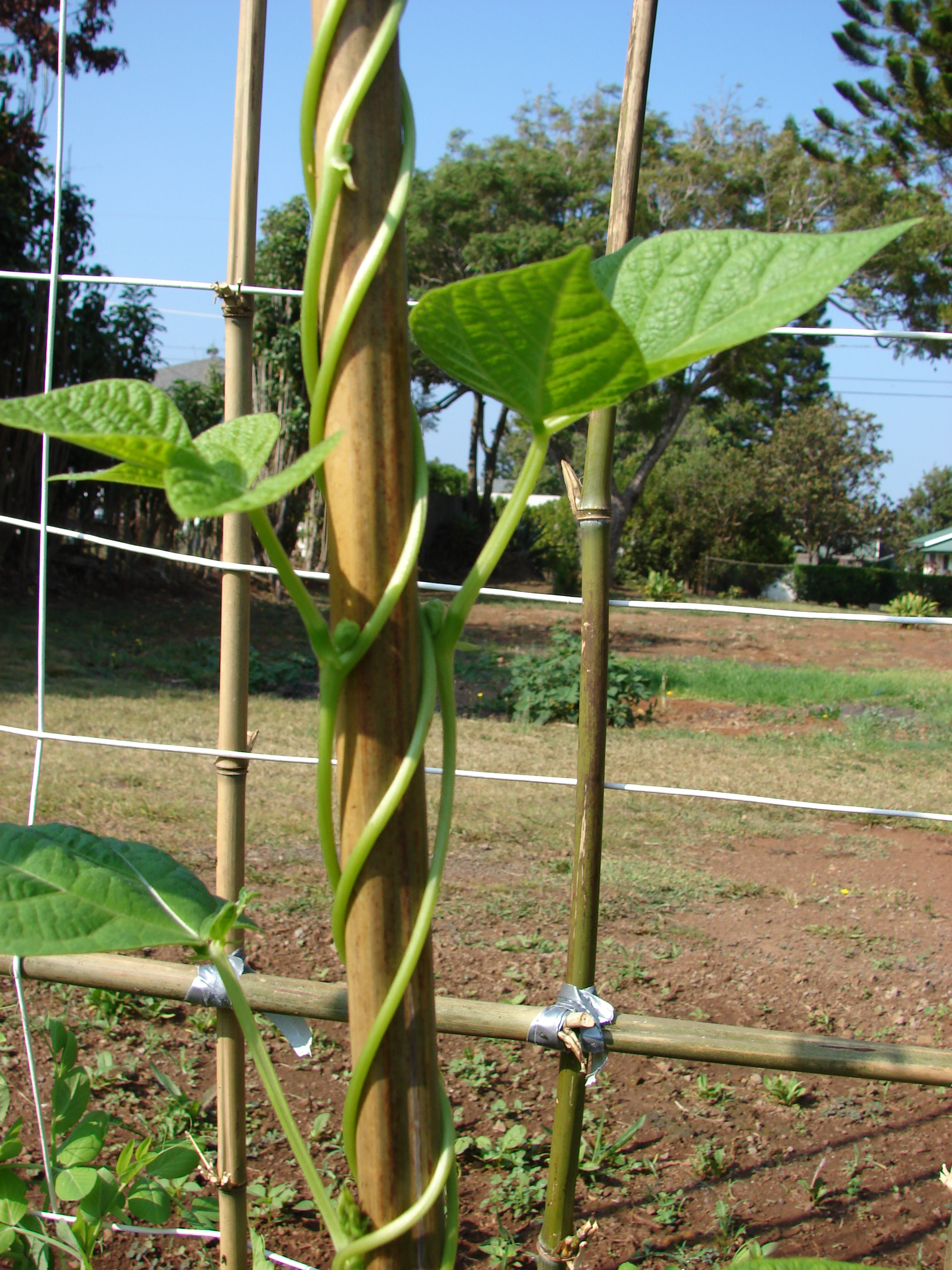
Anti-clockwise wrapping tendrils

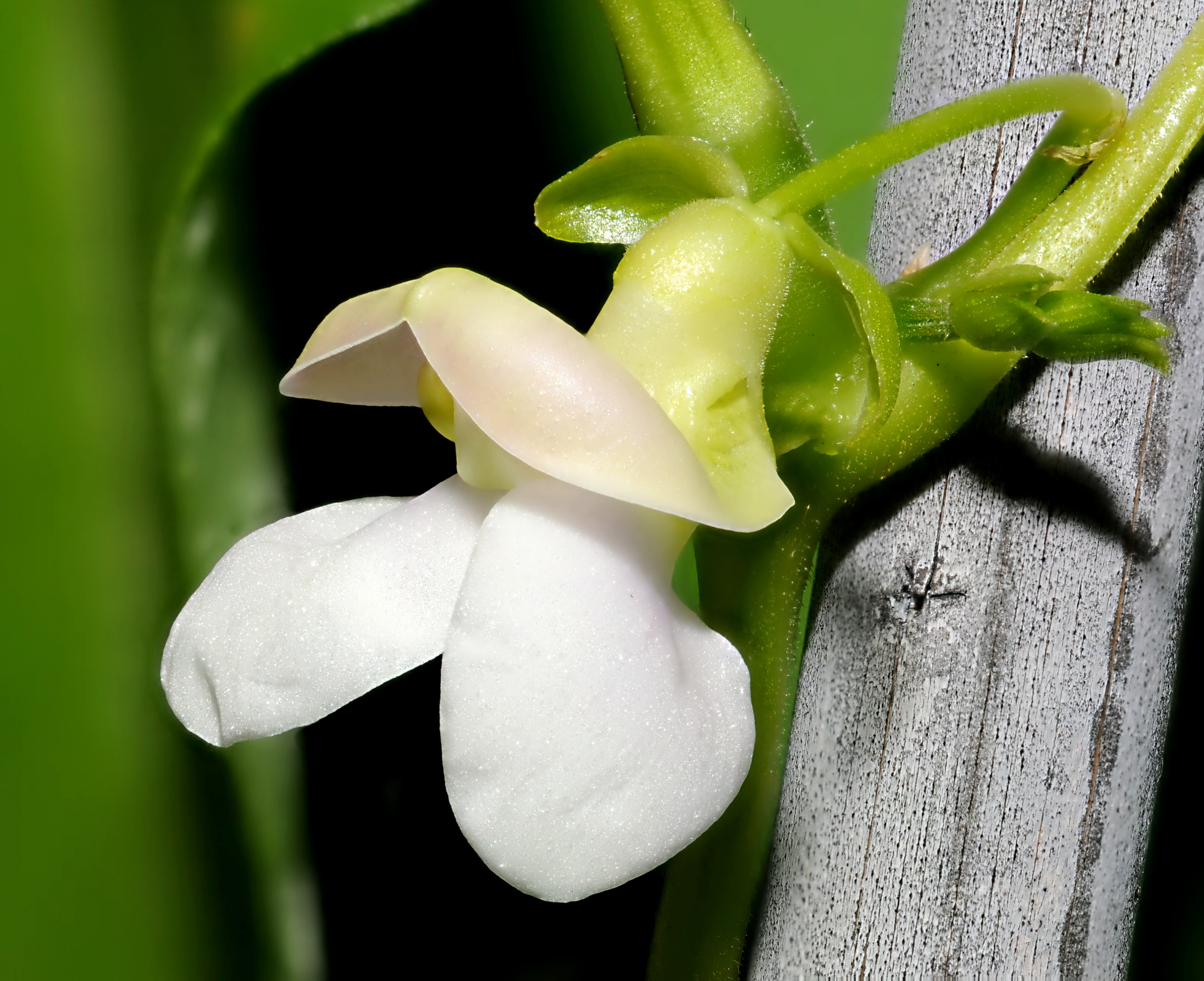
Bean flower close-up

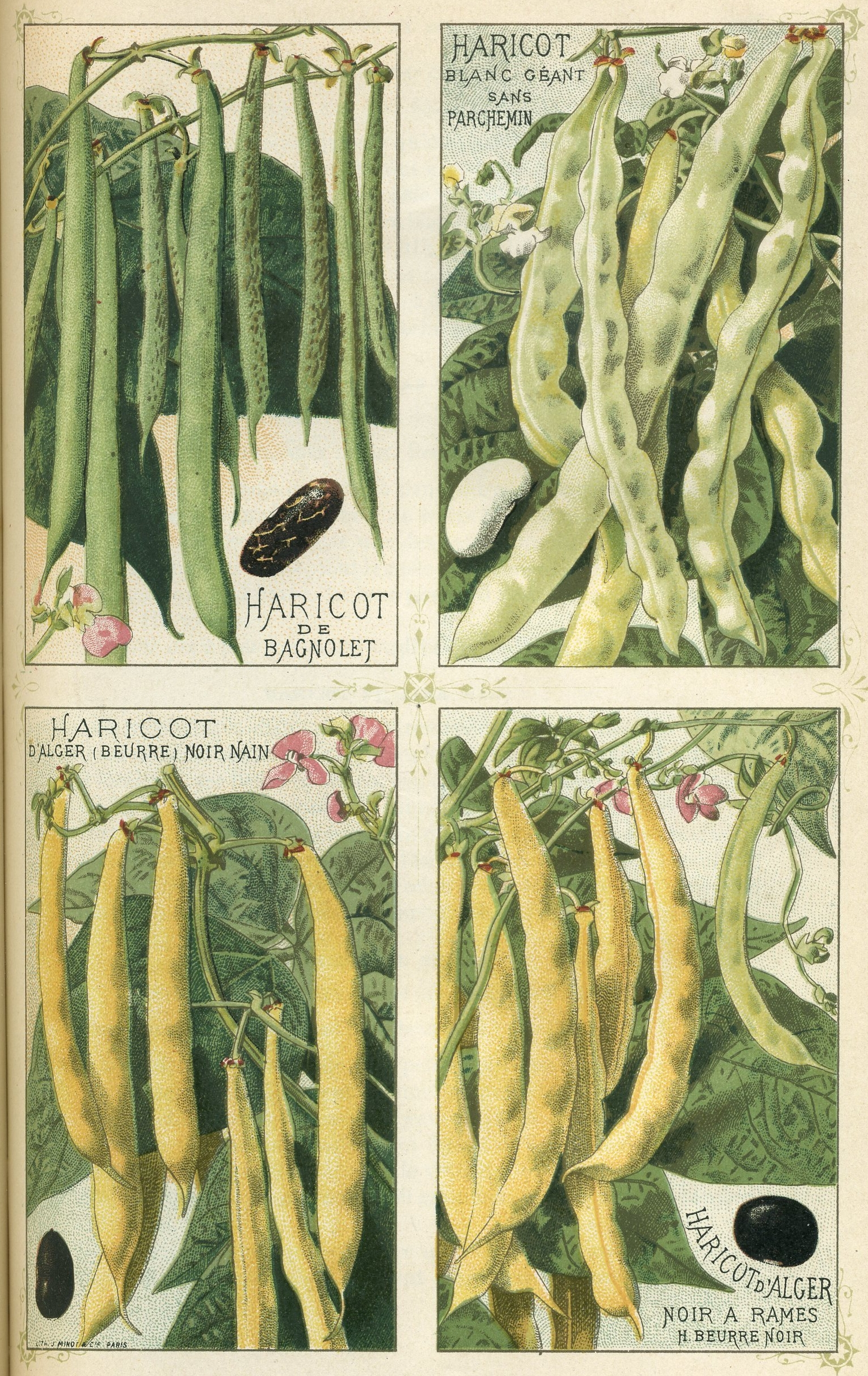
Cultivars illustrated in 1891

== Taxonomy ==
The common bean, like all Phaseolus species, is a member of the legume family, Fabaceae.

In Species Plantarum in 1753, Carl Linnaeus classified the beans known by him into genus Phaseolus and genus Dolichos, naming 11 species of Phaseolus, including 6 cultivated species and 5 "wild" species.

The beans cultivated in Europe prior to the Columbian Exchange were of Asian origin and are unrelated to New World Phaseolus species. The Eurasian species were transferred to other genera including Vigna, Vicia and Lablab, so members of the Phaseolus genus are now all from the Americas.

=== Etymology ===
Ancient Greeks used the word φάσηλος (phasēlos) to refer to the beans of Asian origins that were cultivated in Europe at the time. The Romans used both the Latinized phaseolus and their own faba to refer to different pre-Columbian species of beans, presumably using the word faseolus for smaller seeds like those belonging to the genus Vigna such as black-eyed peas and the word faba for larger seeds, such as the fava beans. This latter word, faba, was related to the Proto-Germanic bauno, from which the Old English word bean is derived and has the meaning of "bean, pea, legume". When Phaseolus vulgaris arrived in Europe in the 16th century, this species was yet another seed in a pod, thus there were already words in the European languages describing it.

In the Americas, P. vulgaris is also known as ayacotl in Nahuatl (Aztec language), búul in Mayan (Maya language) and purutu in Quechua (Inca language). In Argentina, Bolivia, Chile, Paraguay and Uruguay, the Spanish name poroto is used, being derived from its corresponding Quechua word. Additional names include the Castilian Spanish frijol, the Portuguese feijão, and the Catalan fesol.

== Distribution ==
Two genetic pools of the domestication of P. vulgaris 1 – Mesoamerican area 2 – Andean area

Wild P. vulgaris is native to the Americas. It was domesticated separately in Mesoamerica and in the southern Andes region some 8000years ago, giving the domesticated bean two gene pools.

Beans, squash, and maize (corn) are the three Mesoamerican crops that constitute the "Three Sisters", central to indigenous American agriculture.

The common bean arrived in Europe as part of the Columbian exchange. It is now grown on every continent except Antarctica.

== Ecology ==
Like most members of Fabaceae, common beans acquire the nitrogen they require through an association with rhizobia, which are nitrogen-fixing bacteria.

== Cultivation ==
Good commercial yield in favorable environments under irrigation is 5 to 7 tonnes per hectare (2 to 3 short ton/acre) fresh and 1.4 to 1.8 t/ha (0.6 to 0.8 short ton/acre) dry seed.

=== Cultivars and varieties ===
Archeologists found large-seeded varieties of the domesticated bean in the highlands of Peru, dating to 2300 BC, and spreading to the coastal regions by around 500 BC. Small-seeded varieties were found in sites in Mexico, dating to 300 BC, which then spread north and east of the Mississippi River by 1000 AD.

Many well-known bean cultivars and varieties belong to this species, and the list below is in no way exhaustive. Both bush and running (pole) cultivars/varieties exist. The colors and shapes of pods and seeds vary over a wide range.

Name	Image	Description
Anasazi		Anasazi beans are a dappled red and white bean first cultivated by Ancestral Puebloan people around 130 AD in what is now the Four Corners region of the United States. Anasazi Bean is often confused with Jacob's Cattle variety, but Anasazi has splashes of color, whereas Jacob's Cattle has splashes and small spots. Anasazi beans were adopted by commercial growers beginning in the 1980s and marketed under the name "Anasazi"; traditionally they were known by the Spanish names frijol conejo (rabbit bean), vaquita (little cow), or pájaro carpintero (woodpecker).
Appaloosa		Front portion of the bean is ivory colored; the other end is speckled with reddish-purple and mocha. The bean is named after the Appaloosa ponies of the Nez Perce tribe. The seed was cultivated near the Palouse River in Eastern Washington and Northern Idaho.
Black turtle		The black turtle bean has small, shiny black seeds. It is especially popular in Latin American cuisine.
Bolita bean		Bolita beans are a traditional variety utilized in New Mexican cuisine by New Mexican Hispanos from northern New Mexico and southern Colorado. They can range from whitish-tan to beige and even pinkish-purple in color.
Calypso		Calypso beans, also called panda beans or yin–yang beans, are half black and half white, with one or two black dots in the white area. When young, the pods can be harvested as green beans. But when full-grown, they are used as a bean for drying.
Cranberry		The cranberry beans originated in Colombia as the cargamanto bean. Borlotti or Roman beans are a variety of cranberry beans bred in Italy to have a thicker skin. They are much used in Mediterranean cuisine. A widespread cultivar of European borlotti is 'Borlotto Lingua di Fuoco' (Tongue of Fire).
Dragon tongue		The dragon tongue bean is a type of cranberry bean. It is a flavorful, juicy bean whose seeds are encased in a buffed, colorful pod with mottled burgundy patterns throughout the shell's surface. The shelled beans are pale pistachio green in color, their size, petite, and their shape, ovate and slightly curved.
Flageolet		Flageolet beans are picked before full maturity and dried in the shade to retain a green color and a distinct taste. The seeds are small, light green, and kidney-shaped. If shelled and cooked when fresh but semi-dry, the texture is firm yet creamy. They are often eaten in France, where they traditionally accompany lamb.
Great northern beans		Great northern beans are a large, flat, kidney-shaped white bean. They have a mild, nutty flavor. They are popular in North America and often added to soups and casseroles.
Jacob's cattle		Similar to Anasazi in appearance, with the exception of having also dots. Legend says the Passamaquoddy indigenous people of Maine gave these beans as a gift to Joseph Clark, the first European child born in Lubec, Maine in the 1600s. Also known as Trout.
Kidney		Kidney beans, also known as red beans, are named for their visual resemblance in shape and color to kidneys. They are sometimes used in chili con carne and are an integral part of the cuisine in northern regions of India. They are also used in New Orleans and much of southern Louisiana for the Monday Creole dish of red beans and rice as well as the Caribbean habichuelas guisadas and Central American gallo pinto.
Mocha with cherry		"Mocha with cherry" is a polebean. This variety is said to come from the Rodope area in Bulgaria, and to be related to "Papa de Rola" and "Dove's Breast".
North Holland brown		This bean is an old Dutch Heirloom bush variety primarily used for dried beans.
Pea, painted pony		A type of P. vulgaris called pea bean has been recorded in Britain since the 16th century. In the US, the name "pea bean" is also used to describe small white beans and the same name is used for Vigna unguiculata subsp. sesquipedalis, also called yard-long bean and cowpea. The seeds of the British pea bean are bicolored red-brown and white (not to be confused with Jacob's Cattle, which is darker red than reddish-brown). The plants are typical climbing beans. The beans are either eaten in the pod-like French beans or may be harvested when mature and eaten as other dried beans.
Peruano		Also known as mayocoba, canary, canario, Peruvian, Mexican yellow bean. A light green to jaundice yellow kidney-shaped bean that is preferred in certain regions of Mexico (such as Jalisco) for making frijoles refritos, and in Peru for making tacu tacu, a pan-fried cake of leftover beans and rice. Often described as having a "buttery" and "creamy" texture.
Pink		Pink beans are small, pale pink, oval-shaped beans also known by the Spanish name habichuelas rosadas. The Santa Maria pinquito (Spanglish = pink and small), is commercially grown on the mesas above Santa Maria, California, and is a necessary ingredient in Santa Maria-style barbecue.
Pinto		Pinto beans are named for their mottled skin (Spanish: pinto = painted or mottled). They are the most common bean in the United States and northwestern Mexico, and are most often eaten whole in broth or mashed and refried. Either whole or mashed, they are a common filling for burritos. The young pods may also be harvested and cooked as green pinto beans.
Polish eagle beans		Also called by the Independence bean by the Polish people because the brown pattern on the inner side of the bean resembles an eagle, the Polish emblem. This bean variety was cultivated in the 19th Century as an act of patriotism by the Polish people.
Rattlesnake		A medium-sized, oblong bean with light brown seeds striped with brown markings. Named for the snake-like manner in which their pods coil around the vine.
Small red beans		Small red beans, also known as "Mexican red beans", "Central American red beans", and "New Orleans red beans". Popular in central america. Often confused with kidney beans their cousin for a similar color.
Sulphur		Also known as "China yellow bean", a thin-skinned, nearly round Maine heirloom bean that has a tawny yellow color but cooks white and has a distinctly unique flavor. This is a choice variety for use in the traditional Bean Hole style.
Tiger's eye		A bush variety, thought to have originated in Chile or Argentina.
White		Navy beans or haricot beans are particularly popular in the United Kingdom and the United States. White beans are the most abundant plant-based source of phosphatidylserine known.
Yellow (Enola type)		'Sinaloa Azufrado', 'Mayocoba', and 'Peruano' (also called canary) are yellow beans. Peruano beans (see above) are small, oval, yellow beans about 1/2 in (1 cm) long with a thin skin. They have a creamy texture when cooked. Despite the name ('Peruvian beans' in Spanish), they are native to Mexico. Yellow beans are uncommon in the United States due to a controversial patent issued in 1999 to John Proctor, who selected and named a strain of yellow beans from seeds he brought back from Mexico. U.S. Patent No. 5,894,079 (the Enola or yellow bean patent) granted POD-NERS, LLC., exclusive right to import and sell yellow beans in the US from 1999 through 2008 when the patent was rejected after reexamination.
Yellow eye		Also known as Maine yellow eye, this is the most popular baking bean in Maine, which comes in several strains, including the 'Steuben', one of the oldest heirloom beans. It has a wide appeal for its clean, mild taste and is considered the baked bean of choice for church and grange suppers.

Dry bean production – 2022
Country	Millions of tonnes
India	6.6
Brazil	2.8
Myanmar	2.7
China	1.3
United States	1.2
Mexico	1.0
World	28.3
Source: FAOSTAT of the United Nations

=== Production ===
In 2022, world production of dry common beans was 28 million tonnes, led by India with 23% of the total. Brazil and Myanmar were secondary producers.

== Toxicity ==
The toxic compound phytohaemagglutinin, a lectin, is present in many common bean varieties but is especially concentrated in red kidney beans. White kidney beans contain about a third as much phytohaemagglutinin as the red variety; broad beans (Vicia faba) contain 5–10% of the amount that red kidney beans contain.

Phytohaemagglutinin can be inactivated by a two-step process. The United States Food and Drug Administration recommends soaking the dry beans for at least five hours in water, which should then be discarded; this first step is largely for reducing indigestible carbohydrates. Then boiling the hydrated (wet, soft) beans for 30 minutes to ensure they reach a sufficient temperature for long enough to destroy the toxin completely.

Outbreaks of poisoning have been associated with cooking kidney beans in slow cookers at 80 °C/176 °F, which is insufficient to deactivate all toxins.

The primary symptoms of phytohaemagglutinin poisoning are nausea, vomiting, and diarrhea. Onset is from one to three hours after consumption of improperly prepared beans, and symptoms typically resolve within a few hours. Consumption of as few as four or five raw, soaked kidney beans can cause symptoms. Canned red kidney beans are safe to use immediately, as they have already been cooked.

Beans are high in purines, which are metabolized to uric acid. Uric acid is not a toxin but may promote the development or exacerbation of gout. However, more recent research has questioned this association, finding that moderate intake of purine-rich foods is not associated with an increased risk of gout.

Beans, snap, green, raw
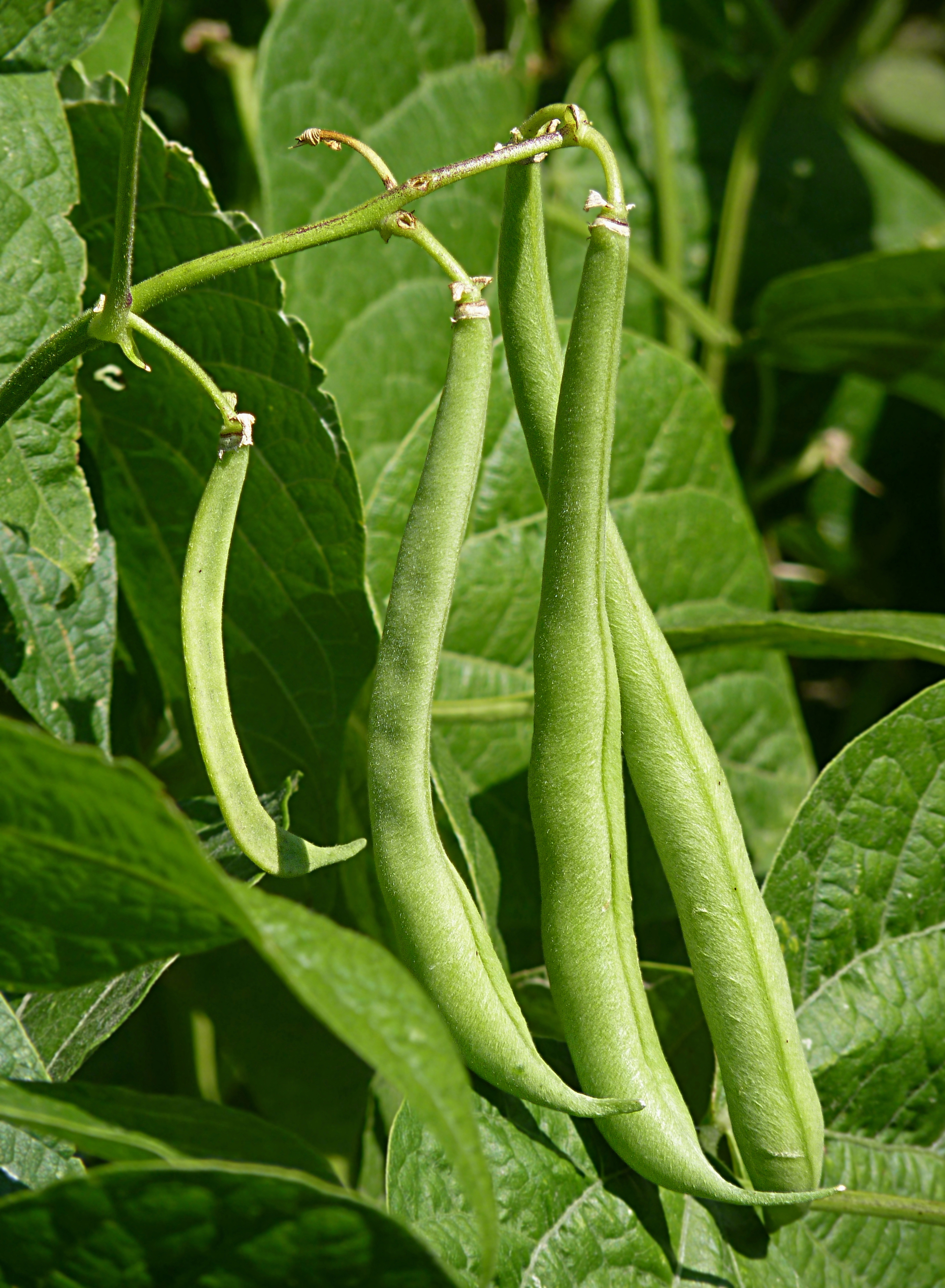

Nutritional value per 100 g (3.5 oz)
- Energy: 152 kJ (36 kcal)
- Carbohydrates: 6.97 g
- Sugars: 3.26 g
- Dietary fiber: 2.7 g
- Fat: 0.22 g
- Protein: 1.3 g
Vitamins and minerals
Vitamins	Quantity %DV^{†}
Vitamin A equiv. beta-Carotene lutein zeaxanthin	4% 35 μg 4% 379 μg 640 μg
Thiamine (B1)	7% 0.082 mg
Riboflavin (B2)	8% 0.104 mg
Niacin (B3)	5% 0.734 mg
Pantothenic acid (B5)	5% 0.225 mg
Vitamin B6	8% 0.141 mg
Folate (B9)	8% 33 μg
Vitamin C	14% 12.2 mg
Vitamin E	3% 0.41 mg
Vitamin K	36% 43 μg
Minerals	Quantity %DV^{†}
Calcium	3% 37 mg
Copper	8% 0.069 mg
Iron	6% 1.03 mg
Magnesium	6% 25 mg
Manganese	9% 0.216 mg
Phosphorus	3% 38 mg
Potassium	7% 211 mg
Selenium	1% 0.6 μg
Sodium	0% 6 mg
Zinc	2% 0.24 mg
- Other constituents: Quantity
- Water: 90.3 g
- Link to USDA Database entry
- ^{†}Percentages estimated using US recommendations for adults, except for potassium, which is estimated based on expert recommendation from the National Academies.

== Uses ==
=== Nutrition ===
Beans, white, mature seeds, cooked, boiled, without salt
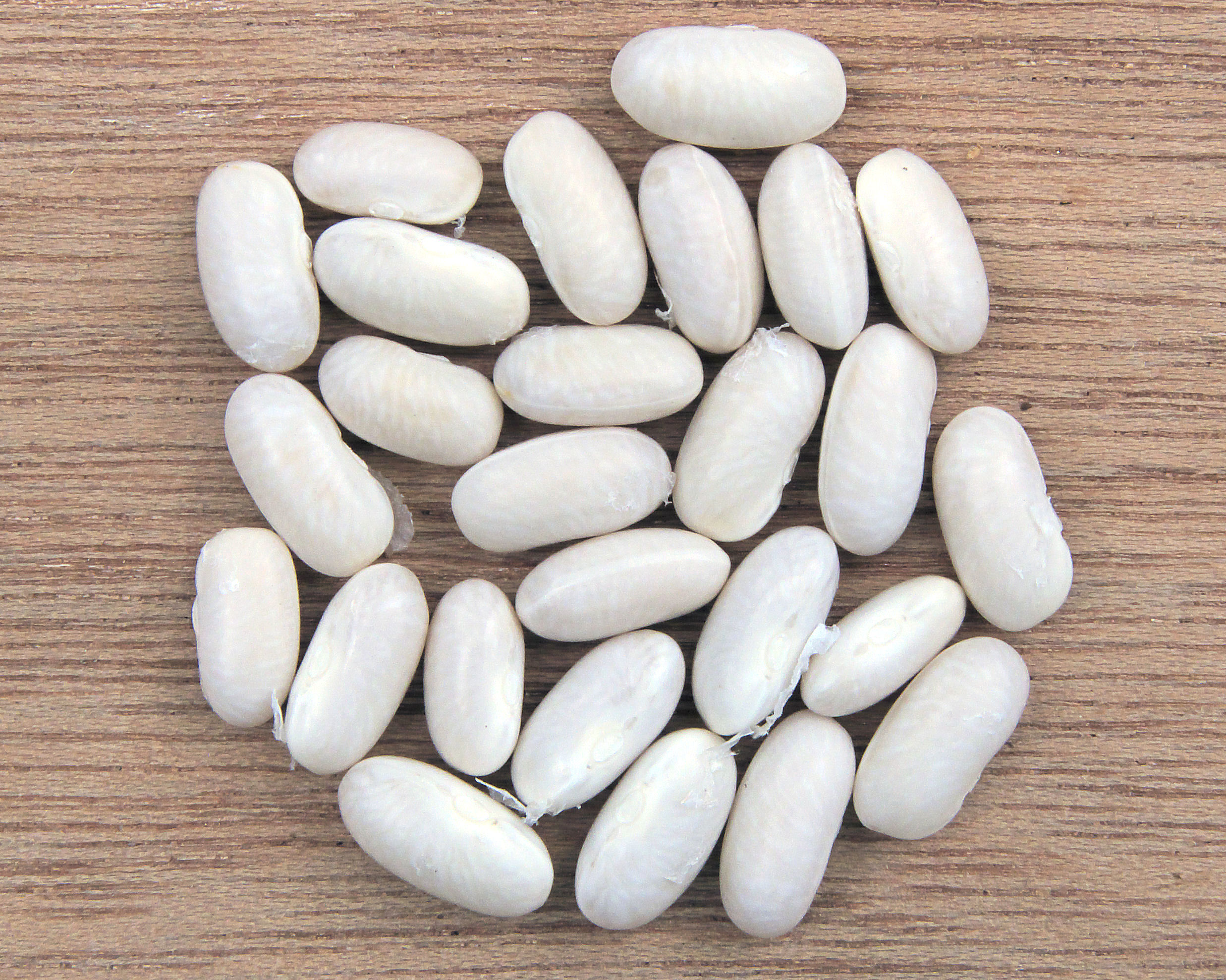

Nutritional value per 100 g (3.5 oz)
- Energy: 581 kJ (139 kcal)
- Carbohydrates: 25.1 g
- Sugars: 0.34 g
- Dietary fiber: 6.3 g
- Fat: 0.35 g
- Protein: 9.73 g
Vitamins and minerals
Vitamins	Quantity %DV^{†}
Thiamine (B1)	10% 0.118 mg
Riboflavin (B2)	4% 0.046 mg
Niacin (B3)	1% 0.14 mg
Pantothenic acid (B5)	5% 0.229 mg
Vitamin B6	5% 0.093 mg
Folate (B9)	20% 81 μg
Vitamin C	0% 0 mg
Vitamin E	6% 0.94 mg
Vitamin K	3% 3.5 μg
Minerals	Quantity %DV^{†}
Calcium	7% 90 mg
Copper	32% 0.287 mg
Iron	21% 3.7 mg
Magnesium	15% 63 mg
Manganese	28% 0.636 mg
Phosphorus	9% 113 mg
Potassium	19% 561 mg
Selenium	2% 1.3 μg
Sodium	0% 6 mg
Zinc	13% 1.38 mg
- Other constituents: Quantity
- Water: 63.1 g
- Link to USDA Database entry
- ^{†}Percentages estimated using US recommendations for adults, except for potassium, which is estimated based on expert recommendation from the National Academies.

Raw green beans are 90% water, 7% carbohydrates, and 1% protein and contain negligible fat. In a reference amount of 100 grams (3.5 oz), raw green beans supply about 36 calories and are a rich source (20% or more of the US Daily Value, DV) of vitamin K (41% DV) and a moderate source (10–19% DV) of vitamin C, vitamin B6, and manganese.

Dry white common beans, after boiling, are 63% water, 25% carbohydrates, and 10% protein and contain little fat. In a reference amount of 100 grams (3.5 oz), boiled white common beans supply about 139 calories and are a rich source of folate and manganese, with moderate amounts of thiamine and several dietary minerals.

=== Dry beans ===
Dry beans will keep indefinitely if stored in a cool, dry place, but as time passes, their nutritive value and flavor degrade, and cooking times lengthen. Dried beans are almost always cooked by boiling, often after being soaked in water for several hours. While the soaking is not strictly necessary, it shortens cooking time and results in more evenly textured beans. In addition, soaking beans removes 5 to 10% of the gas-producing sugars that can cause flatulence for some people. The methods include simple overnight soaking and the power-soak method, in which beans are boiled for three minutes and then set aside for 2–4 hours. Before cooking, the soaking water is drained off and discarded. Dry common beans take longer to cook than most pulses: Cooking times vary from one to four hours but are substantially reduced with pressure cooking.

In Mexico, Central America, and South America, the traditional spice used with beans is epazote, which is also said to aid digestion. In East Asia, a type of seaweed, kombu, is added to beans as they cook for the same purpose. Salt, sugar, and acidic foods such as tomatoes may harden uncooked beans, resulting in seasoned beans at the expense of slightly longer cooking times.

Dry beans may also be bought cooked and canned as refried beans, or whole with water, salt, and sometimes sugar.

=== Green beans and wax beans ===
The three commonly known types of green beans are string, or snap, beans, which may be round or have a flat pod; stringless or French beans, which lack a tough, fibrous string running along the length of the pod; and runner beans, which belong to a separate species, Phaseolus coccineus. Green beans may have a purple rather than green pod, which changes to green when cooked. Wax beans are P. vulgaris beans that have a yellow or white pod. Wax bean cultivars are commonly grown; the plants are often of the bush, or dwarf, form.

As the name implies, snap beans break easily when the pod is bent, giving off a distinct audible snapping sound. The pods of snap beans (green, yellow, and purple) are harvested when they are rapidly growing, fleshy, tender (not tough and stringy), and bright in color, and the seeds are small and underdeveloped (8 to 10 days after flowering).

Green beans and wax beans are often steamed, boiled, stir-fried, or baked in casseroles.

=== Shelling beans ===
Shell, shelled, or shelling beans are beans removed from their pods before being cooked or dried. Common beans can be used as shell beans, but the term also refers to other species of beans whose pods are not typically eaten, such as lima beans, soybeans, peas, and fava beans. Fresh shell beans are nutritionally similar to dry beans but are prepared more like vegetables, often steamed, fried, or made into soups.

=== Popping (nuña) beans ===
The nuña is an Andean subspecies, P. v. subsp. nunas (formerly P. vulgaris Nuñas group), with seeds that come in a variety of shapes, colors, and patterns. When cooked on high heat, the bean explodes, exposing the inner part in the manner of popcorn and other puffed grains. Notably, these beans do not require soaking or boiling before consumption, and the dried bean can be safely eaten after being popped.

=== Other uses ===
Bean leaves have been used to trap bedbugs in houses. Microscopic hairs (trichomes) on the bean leaves entrap the insects.

Beans have been used as devices in various methods of divination since ancient times. Fortune-telling using beans is called favomancy.

P. vulgaris has been found to bio-accumulate zinc, manganese, and iron and have some tolerance to their respective toxicities, suggesting suitability for natural bio-remediation of heavy-metal-contaminated soils.

== In culture ==
In 1528, Pope Clemente VII received some white beans, which thrived. Five years later, he gave a bag of beans as a present to his niece, Catherine, on her wedding to Prince Henri of France, along with the county of the Lauragais, whose county town is Castelnaudary, now synonymous with the white bean dish of cassoulet.

== Gallery ==
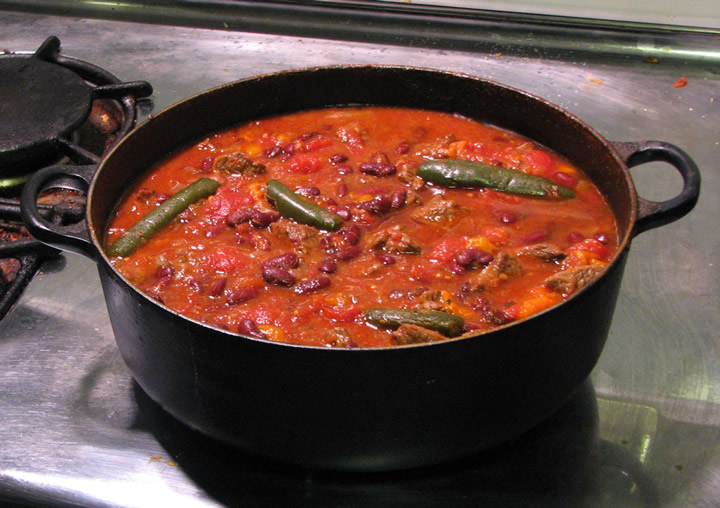
Chili con carne

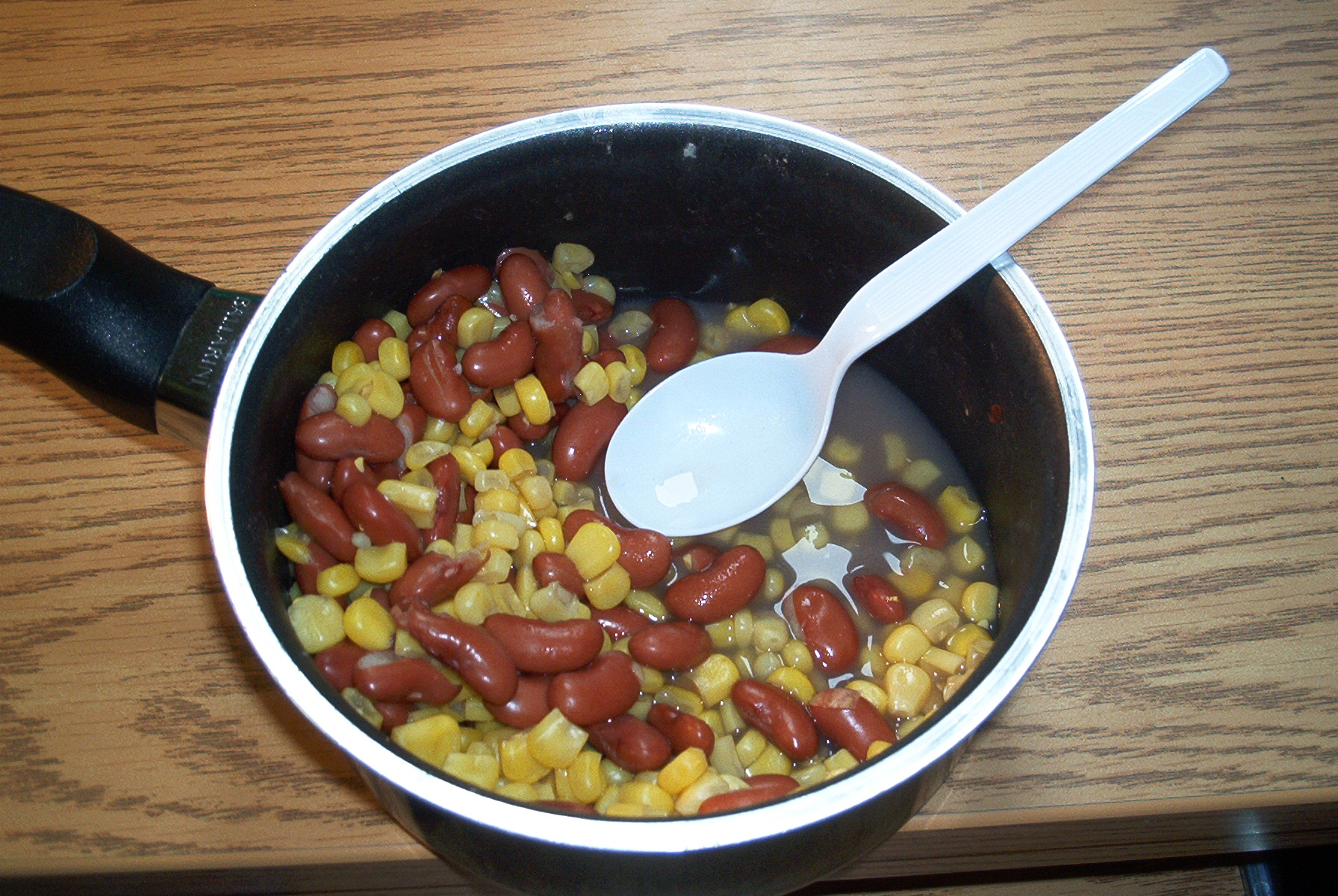
Succotash

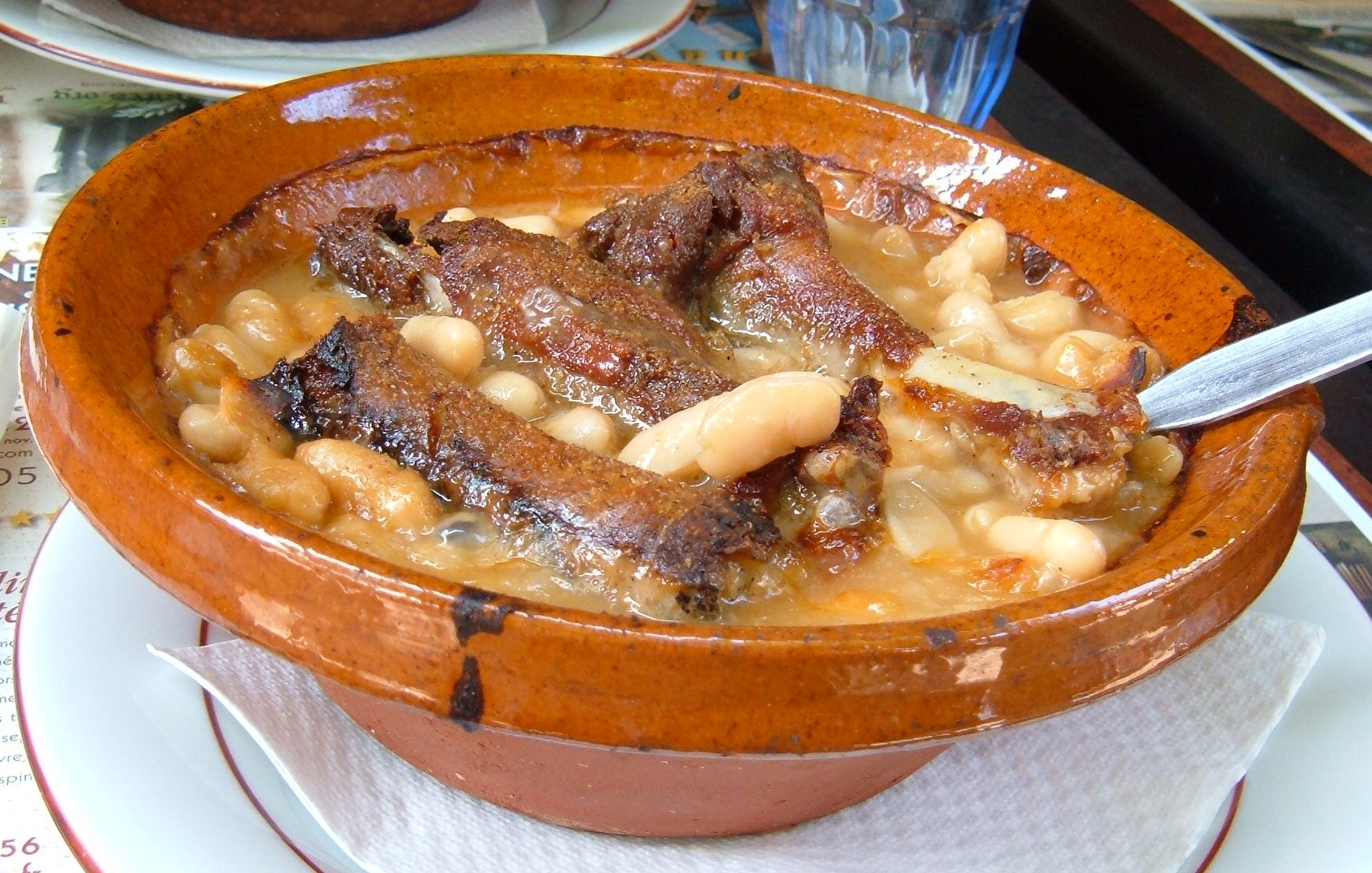
Cassoulet

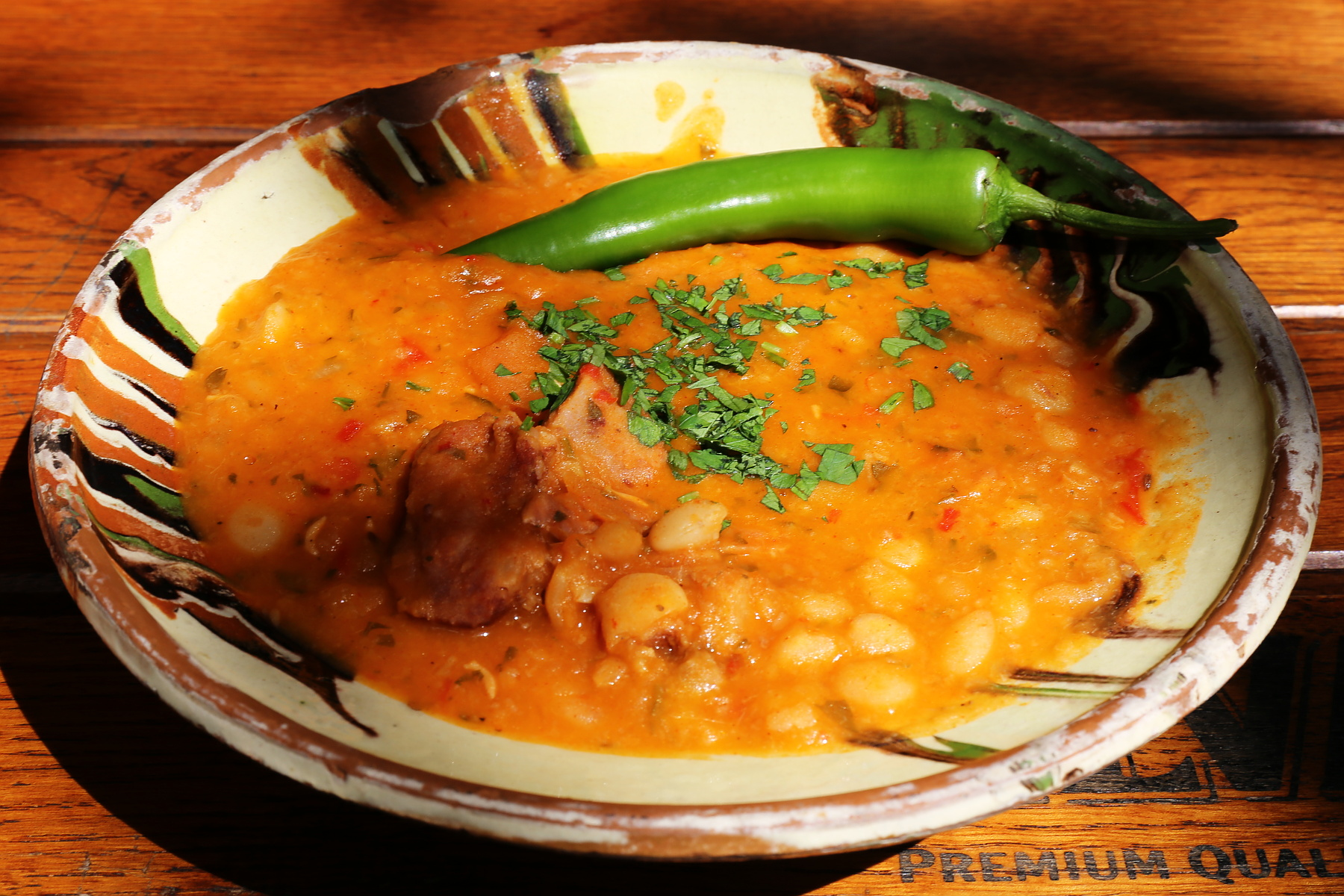
Beans with smoked pork, a traditional Romanian dish

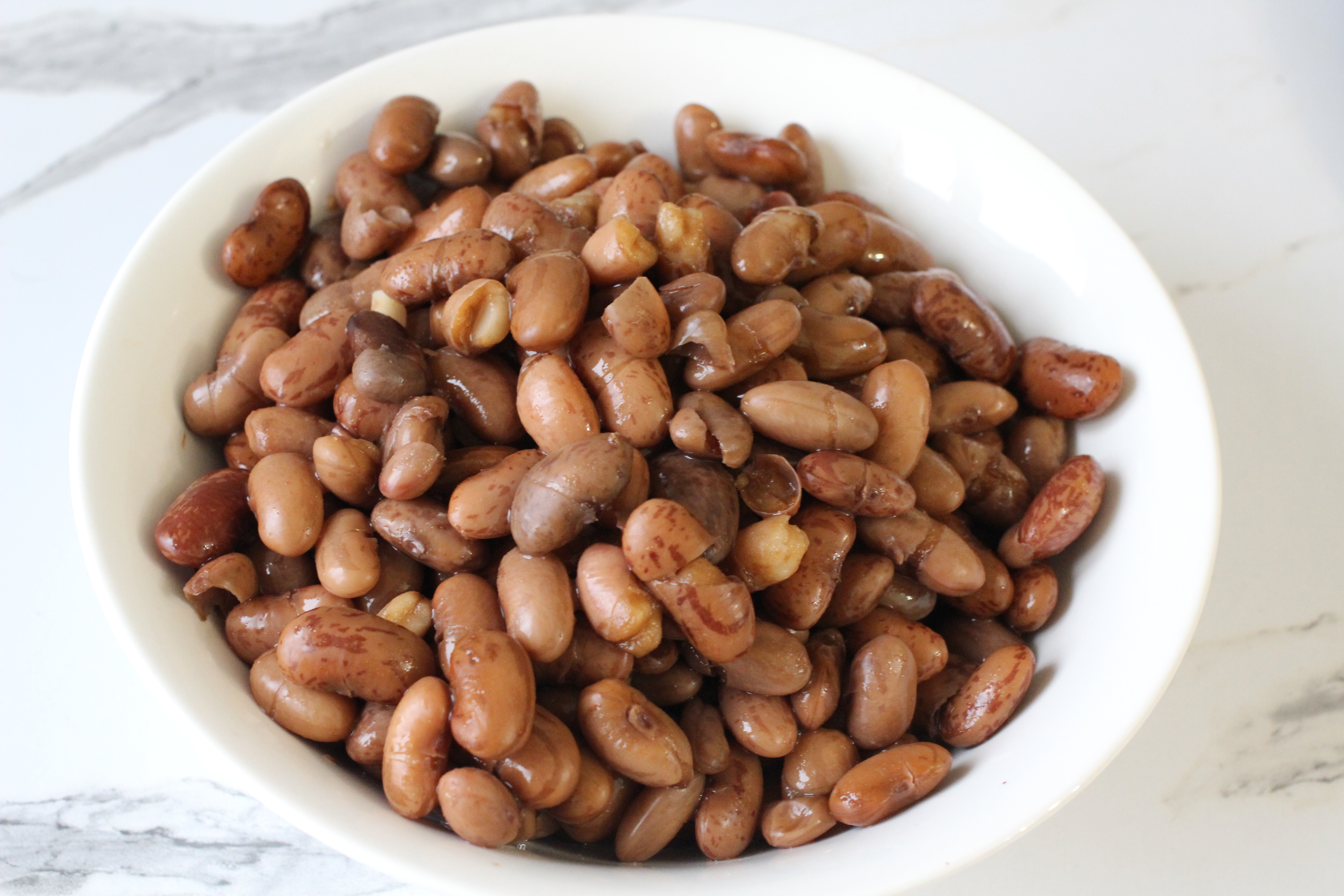
Boiled beans

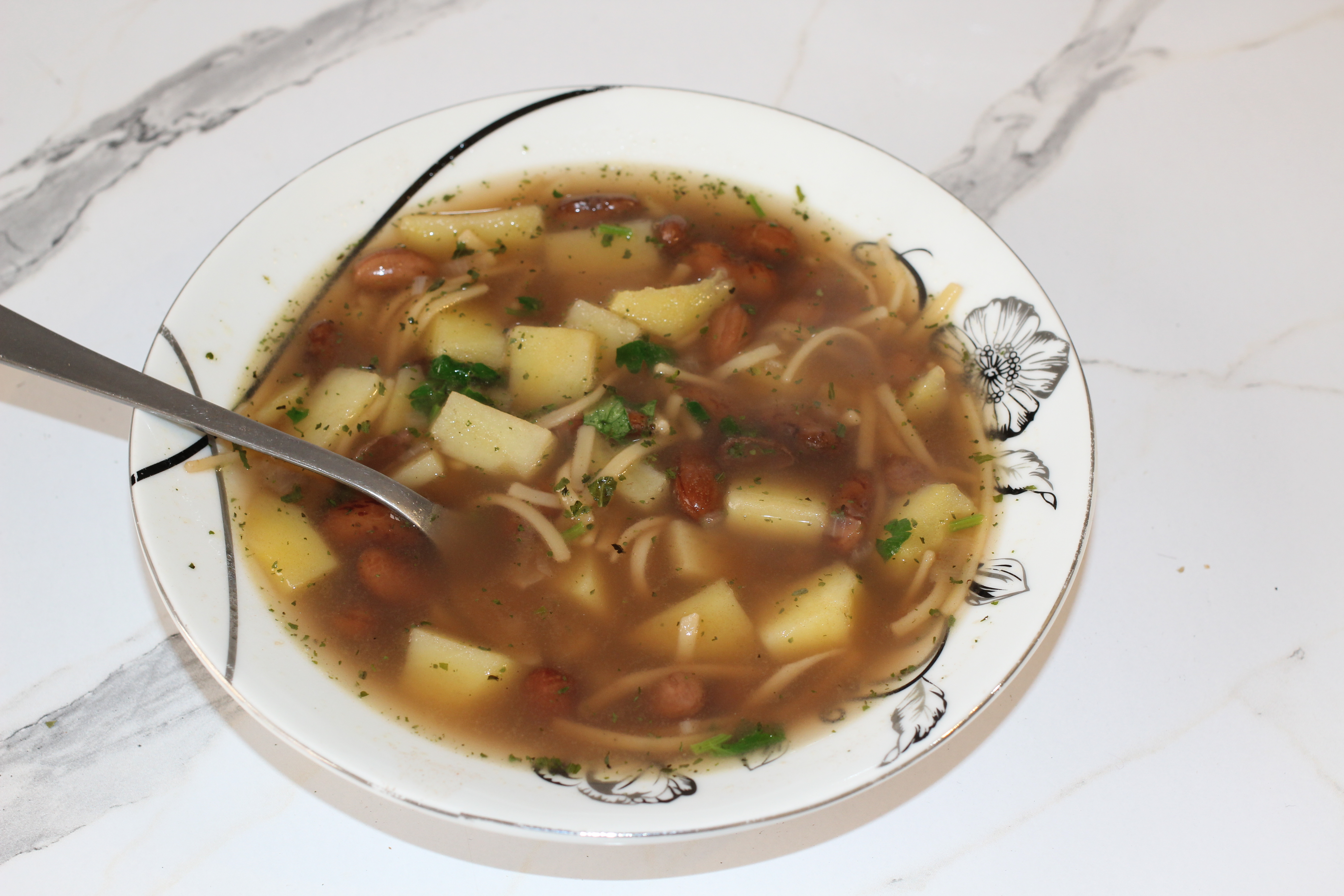
Bean soup

== See also ==
- Adzuki bean
- Chickpea
- Dal
- Lentil
- List of dried foods
- List of diseases of the common bean
- Mung bean
- Organic beans
- Vicia faba, or broad bean
