= Flageolet bean =

Variety of bean

Flageolet beans, raw
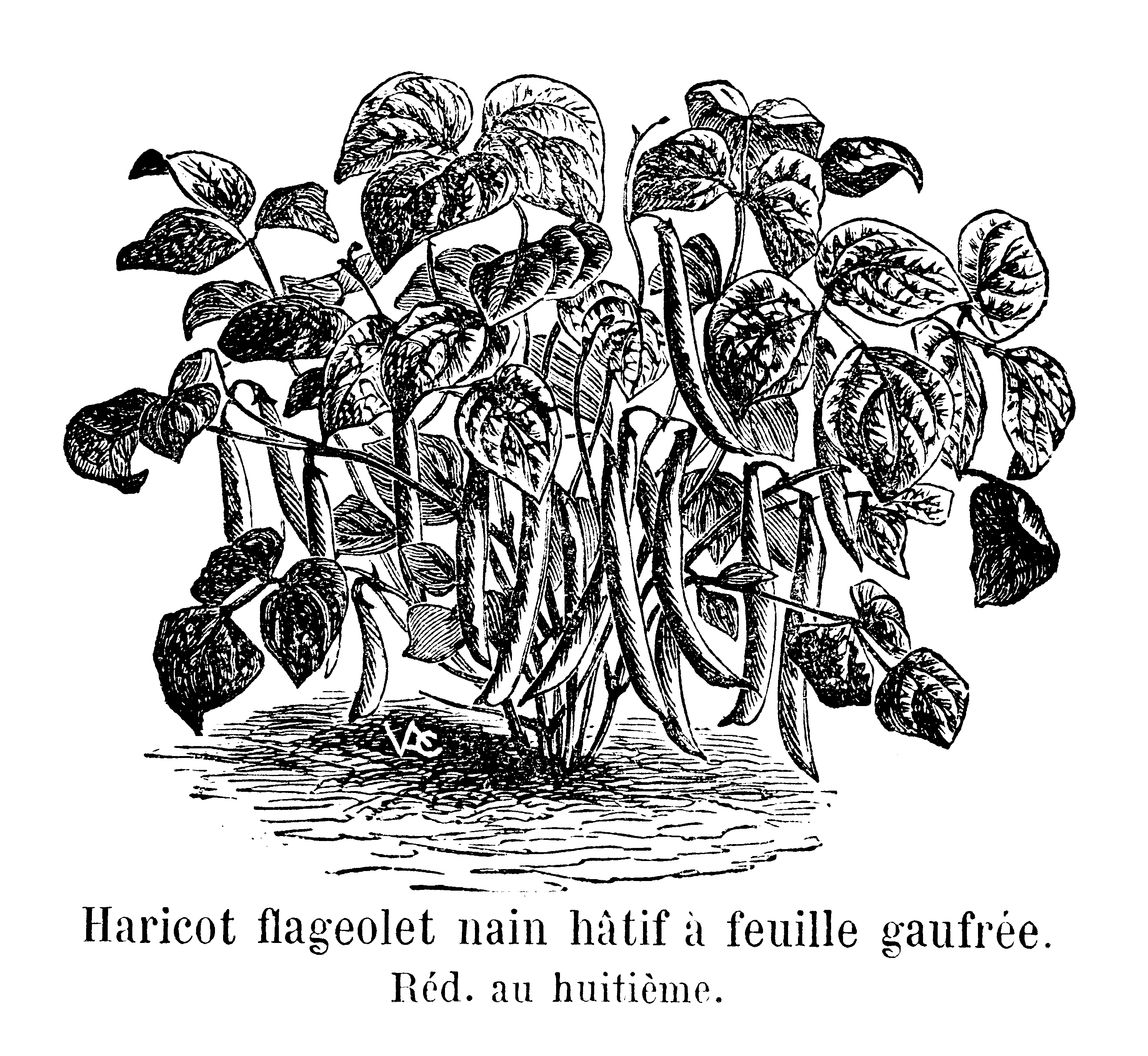

Nutritional value per 100 g (3.5 oz)
- Energy: 1,084 kJ (259 kcal)
- Carbohydrates: 19.8 g
- Sugars: 1.0 g
- Dietary fiber: 40.4 g
- Fat: 6.2 g
- Protein: 30.4 g
Vitamins and minerals
Minerals	Quantity %DV^{†}
Sodium	0% 10 mg
- ^{†}Percentages estimated using US recommendations for adults, except for potassium, which is estimated based on expert recommendation from the National Academies

The flageolet bean is a variety of the common bean (Phaseolus vulgaris) originating from France. The flageolet is picked before full maturity and dried in the shade to retain its green color. The bean is small, light green, and kidney-shaped. The texture is firm and creamy when shelled and cooked, and in France the bean is a traditional accompaniment to a roasted leg of lamb. Besides France, the flageolet bean is grown in California.

Flageolet bean varieties include:

- Chevrier (the original heirloom)
- Elsa
- Flambeau
- Flamingo

== Etymology ==
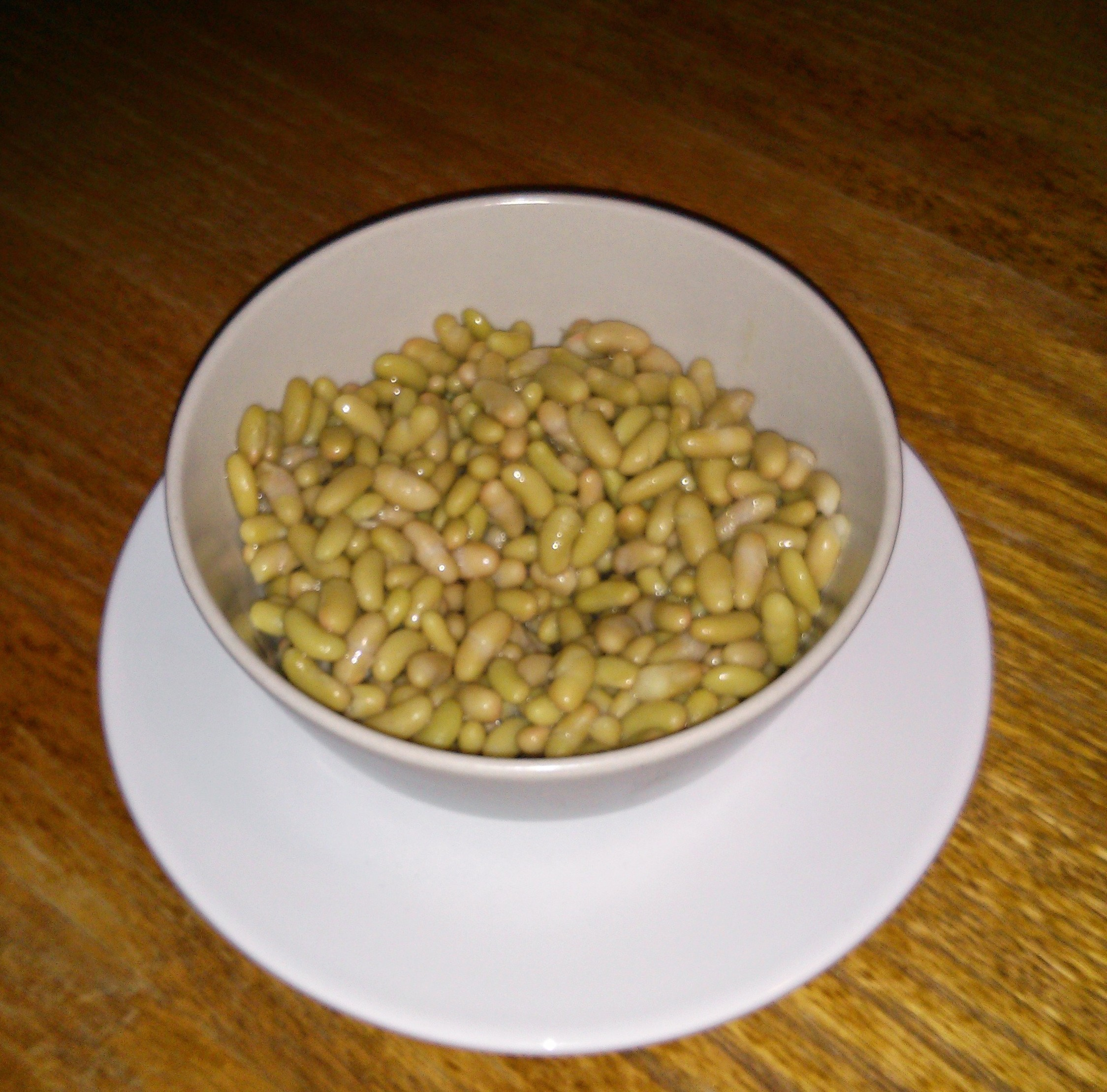
Canned flageolet beans

The bean's name is most likely derived from the appearance of its pod. It may be derived from an Old French word for "little flute" (flageolet). The name could also be a corruption of the Latin genus "phaseolus" from "phaselus" (a small boat).
