= Cranberry bean =

Variety of common bean

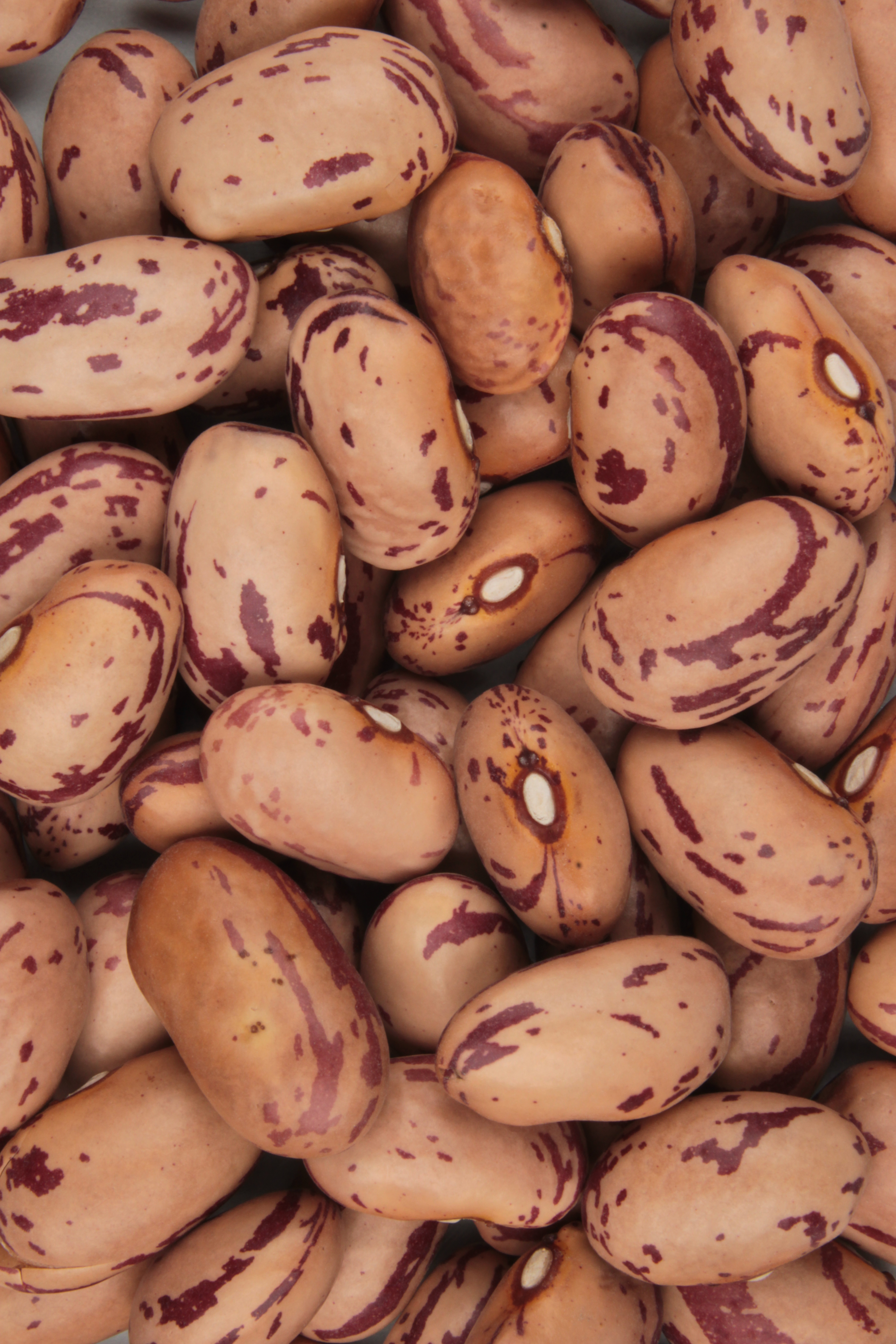
- Species: Phaseolus vulgaris
- Marketing names: Borlotti bean, cranberry bean, Roman bean, saluggia bean and rosecoco bean
- Origin: North and South America

Borlotti beans, raw
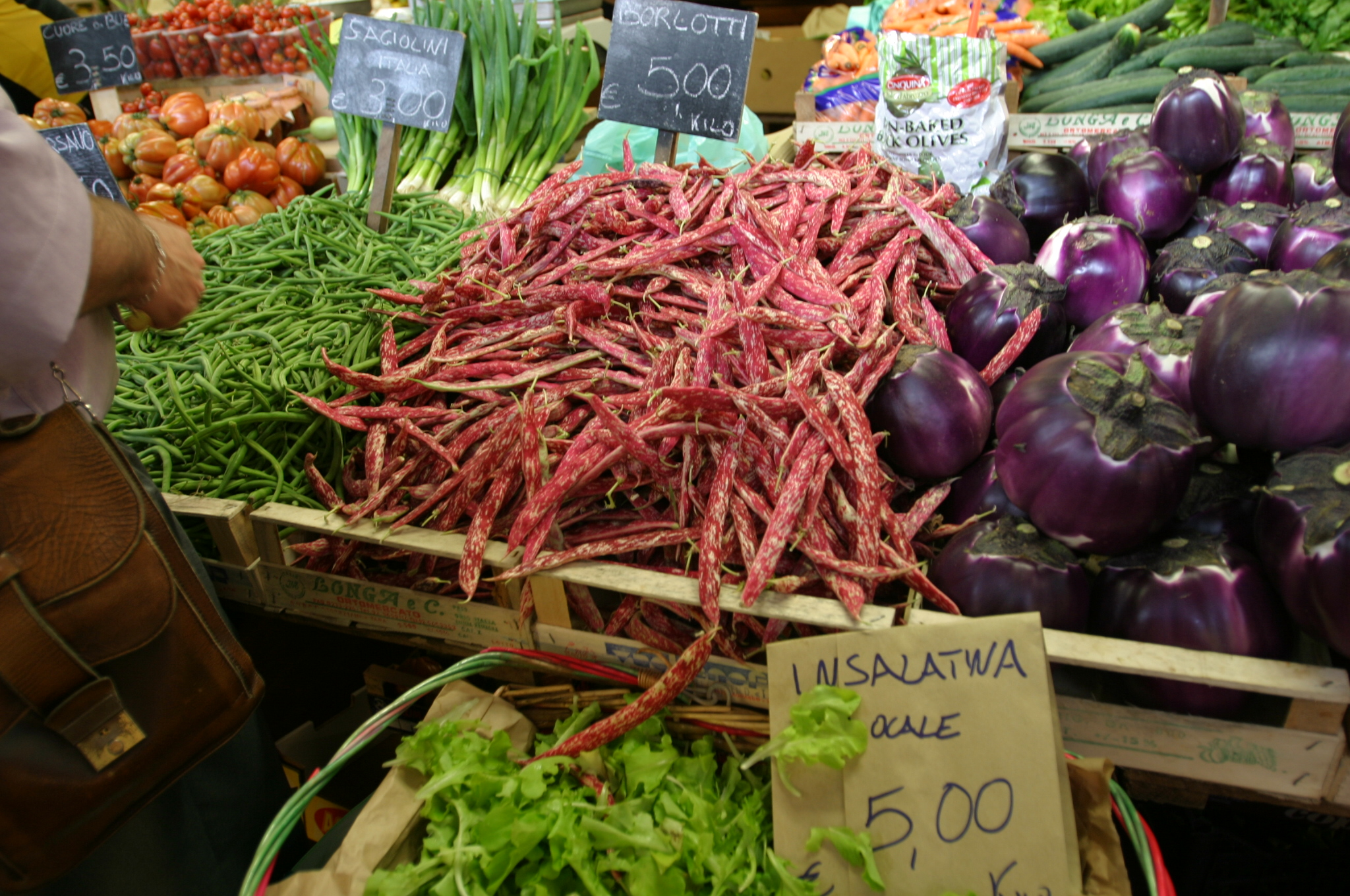
- Fresh borlotti beans

Nutritional value per 100 g (3.5 oz)
- Energy: 1,458 kJ (348 kcal)
- Carbohydrates: 60.05 g
- Sugars: 2.4 g
- Dietary fiber: 24.7 g
- Fat: 1.23 g
- Saturated: 0.244 g
- Protein: 23.03 g
Vitamins and minerals
Minerals	Quantity %DV^{†}
Sodium	0% 6 mg
- ^{†}Percentages estimated using US recommendations for adults.

The cranberry bean is a variety of common bean (Phaseolus vulgaris) first bred in Colombia as the cargamanto. It is also known as the borlotti bean, Roman bean, romano bean (not to be confused with the Italian flat bean, a green bean also called "romano bean"), saluggia bean, gadhra bean or rosecoco bean. The bean is a medium to large tan or hazelnut-colored bean splashed or streaked with red, magenta or black.

Saluggia beans are regional, a borlotti bean named after Saluggia in northern Italy for marketing purposes and where they have been grown since the early 1900s.

== Characteristics ==
The borlotti bean is a variety of the cranberry bean bred in Italy to have a thicker skin. It is used in Italian, Portuguese (called the Catarino bean), Turkish, and Greek cuisine.

The cranberry bean looks similar to the pinto bean, but cranberry beans are larger and have big maroon, magenta, or black specks on a creamy white background, more like Great Northern beans. After cooking, however, the specks vanish and the beans take on a more even, darker color.

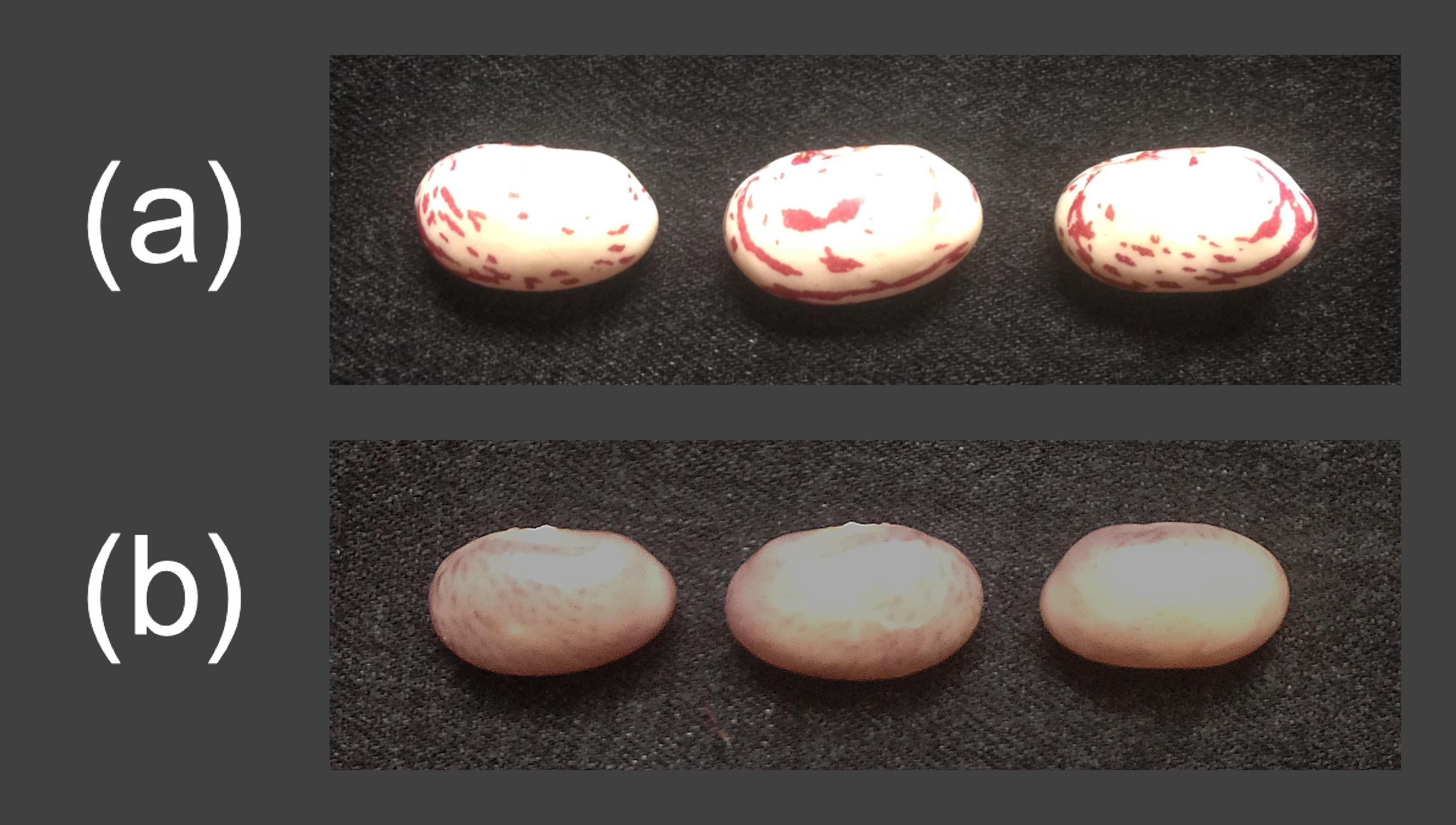
(a) three raw borlotti beans. (b) the same three borlotti beans, but cooked.

A new cranberry bean variety, Crimson, is light tan speckled with maroon. It is resistant to viruses and has a high yield.

'Crimson' is a new cranberry dry bean.

=== Cultivars ===
- Borlotto Lingua di Fuoco (Tongue of Fire), 60 days, bush, heirloom
