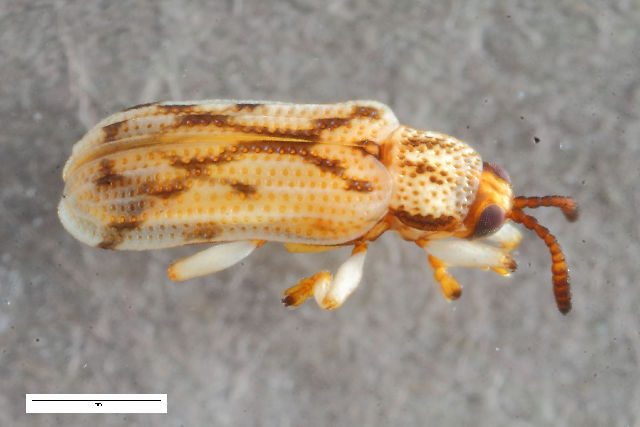

Scientific classification
- Kingdom: Animalia
- Phylum: Arthropoda
- Clade: Pancrustacea
- Class: Insecta
- Order: Coleoptera
- Suborder: Polyphaga
- Infraorder: Cucujiformia
- Family: Chrysomelidae
- Genus: Sumitrosis
- Species: S. ancoroides

Binomial name
- Sumitrosis ancoroides (Schaeffer, 1933)

Synonyms
- Anoplitis ancoroides Schaeffer, 1933

= Sumitrosis ancoroides =

Species of beetle

Sumitrosis ancoroides is a species of leaf beetle in the family Chrysomelidae. It is found in North America, where it has been recorded from Canada (Alberta, Manitoba, Saskatchewan) and the United States (Alabama, Arkansas, District of Columbia, Florida, Georgia, Illinois, Iowa, Kansas, Louisiana, Maryland, Mississippi, Missouri, New Jersey, Oklahoma, Pennsylvania, South Carolina, Tennessee, Texas, Virginia).

== Description ==
Adults reach a length of about 2.9-3.7 mm. The antennae are black. The lateral margins of the pronotum have a black vitta and a black somewhat V-shaped marking. The suture of the elytra is partly bluish black and there is a small anchor-shaped spot, as well as three small black spots.

== Biology ==
The recorded food plants are Strophostyles helvola, Strophostyles umbellata, Stylosanthes biflora and Glycine max.
