= Wild bean =

Wild bean is a common name for several plants and may refer to:

- Phaseolus, a genus in the family Fabaceae
- Strophostyles helvula, a species of bean in the family Fabaceae
- Strophostyles umbellata, a species of bean in the family Fabaceae
