= Phaseolus trilobus =

Phaseolus trilobus can refer to:

- Phaseolus trilobus Aiton, a synonym of Pueraria montana var. lobata (Willd.) Maesen & S.M.Almeida ex Sanjappa & Predeep
- Phaseolus trilobus Michx., a synonym of Strophostyles helvola (L.) Elliott
