= Sumitrosis opacicollis =

Scientific classification
- Kingdom: Animalia
- Phylum: Arthropoda
- Clade: Pancrustacea
- Class: Insecta
- Order: Coleoptera
- Suborder: Polyphaga
- Infraorder: Cucujiformia
- Family: Chrysomelidae
- Genus: Sumitrosis
- Species: S. opacicollis

Binomial name
- Sumitrosis opacicollis (Baly, 1885)

Synonyms
- Chalepus opacicollis Baly, 1885

Species of beetle

Sumitrosis opacicollis is a species of beetle of the family Chrysomelidae. It is found in Panama.

== Description ==
The head is smooth, the vertex and front faintly impressed with a longitudinal groove and the interocular space very slightly produced. The antennae are robust, slightly tapering at the base and apex. The thorax is scarcely longer than broad, with the sides rounded, converging in front, obsoletely angulate, convex, transversely impressed on the hinder disc, and again less distinctly so before the middle, opaque, impressed, but not very closely, with large, ill-defined punctures. The elytra are elongate, parallel and regularly rounded at the apex, the sides finely, the apical margin more strongly and irregularly, serrulate. Each elytron has eight, at the extreme base with nine, rows of large, deeply impressed punctures, the second, fourth, and sixth interspaces costate, the sixth serrulate.

== Biology ==
The food plant is unknown.
