= Sumitrosis tibialis =

Scientific classification
- Kingdom: Animalia
- Phylum: Arthropoda
- Clade: Pancrustacea
- Class: Insecta
- Order: Coleoptera
- Suborder: Polyphaga
- Infraorder: Cucujiformia
- Family: Chrysomelidae
- Genus: Sumitrosis
- Species: S. tibialis

Binomial name
- Sumitrosis tibialis (Baly, 1885)

Synonyms
- Chalepus tibialis Baly, 1885

Species of beetle

Sumitrosis tibialis is a species of beetle of the family Chrysomelidae. It is found in Panama.

== Description ==
The head is smooth and slightly produced between the eyes. The antennae are nearly half the length of the body and slightly thickened towards the apex. The thorax is broader than long, the sides obsoletely angulate, straight and parallel from the base to the middle, then converging and slightly sinuate to the apex. The anterior angle is obliquely produced into a distinct subacute tooth, transversely convex, faintly excavated transversely behind the middle, coarsely and closely foveolate-punctate, the punctures rather more distant on the medial line. The lateral margin, together with a broad discoidal vitta, is black, the apical margin narrowly edged with piceous. The elytra are rather broader than the thorax, with the sides parallel, very faintly constricted in the middle, obsoletely serrulate. The apex is regularly rounded, its serratures rather more distinct. Each elytron has eight, at the extreme base with nine, rows of punctures, the second, fourth, and sixth interspaces costate.

== Biology ==
The food plant is unknown.
