= Sumitrosis amica =

Scientific classification
- Kingdom: Animalia
- Phylum: Arthropoda
- Clade: Pancrustacea
- Class: Insecta
- Order: Coleoptera
- Suborder: Polyphaga
- Infraorder: Cucujiformia
- Family: Chrysomelidae
- Genus: Sumitrosis
- Species: S. amica

Binomial name
- Sumitrosis amica (Baly, 1885)

Synonyms
- Anoplitis amica Baly, 1885; Chalepus amicus

Species of beetle

Sumitrosis amica is a species of beetle of the family Chrysomelidae. It is found in Colombia, Panama and Venezuela.

== Description ==
The vertex and front are smooth and impunctate, the latter obsoletely sulcate. The antennae are nearly half the length of the body, filiform and slightly thickened towards the apex. The thorax is broader than long and subcylindrical, the sides converging from the base to the apex, more quickly converging and sinuate before the middle, the latter obtusely rounded, with the anterior angle acute. The disc is transversely excavated behind the middle, coarsely and deeply punctured. The elytra are nearly parallel, conjointly rounded at the apex, minutely serrulate. Each elytron has eight, at the extreme base with nine, regular rows of punctures, the second, fourth, and sixth interspaces costate.

== Biology ==
The recorded food plants are Heliconia species.
