= Sumitrosis testacea =

Scientific classification
- Kingdom: Animalia
- Phylum: Arthropoda
- Clade: Pancrustacea
- Class: Insecta
- Order: Coleoptera
- Suborder: Polyphaga
- Infraorder: Cucujiformia
- Family: Chrysomelidae
- Genus: Sumitrosis
- Species: S. testacea

Binomial name
- Sumitrosis testacea (Pic, 1934)

Synonyms
- Anoplitis testacea Pic, 1934

Species of beetle

Sumitrosis testacea is a species of beetle of the family Chrysomelidae. It is found in Argentina.

== Biology ==
The food plant is unknown.
