= Sumitrosis lepidula =

Scientific classification
- Kingdom: Animalia
- Phylum: Arthropoda
- Clade: Pancrustacea
- Class: Insecta
- Order: Coleoptera
- Suborder: Polyphaga
- Infraorder: Cucujiformia
- Family: Chrysomelidae
- Genus: Sumitrosis
- Species: S. lepidula

Binomial name
- Sumitrosis lepidula (Weise, 1905)

Synonyms
- Anoplitis lepidula Weise, 1905

Species of beetle

Sumitrosis lepidula is a species of beetle of the family Chrysomelidae. It is found in Peru.

== Biology ==
The food plants is unknown.
