= Sumitrosis weisei =

Scientific classification
- Kingdom: Animalia
- Phylum: Arthropoda
- Clade: Pancrustacea
- Class: Insecta
- Order: Coleoptera
- Suborder: Polyphaga
- Infraorder: Cucujiformia
- Family: Chrysomelidae
- Genus: Sumitrosis
- Species: S. weisei

Binomial name
- Sumitrosis weisei Staines, 1993

Synonyms
- Charistena championi Baly, 1885 (preocc.)

Species of beetle

Sumitrosis weisei is a species of beetle of the family Chrysomelidae. It is found in Belize.

== Description ==
The head is tinged with aeneous and the vertex and front are impressed with a number of longitudinal grooves. The antennae are slightly longer than the head and thorax, robust and thickened towards the apex. The thorax is subcylindrical, rather broader than long, the sides obtusely angulate, straight and parallel behind the middle, obliquely converging anteriorly. The upper surface is deeply and closely punctured and there is a patch on the lateral margin, which is, together with the extreme apex, black. The elytra are parallel, regularly rounded at the apex, faintly sinuate at the sutural angle and distinctly serrulate. Each elytron has eight, at the extreme base with nine, rows of large deep punctures, the second, fourth, and sixth interspaces moderately costate, the suture also thickened.

== Biology ==
The food plant is unknown.
