= Sumitrosis bondari =

Scientific classification
- Kingdom: Animalia
- Phylum: Arthropoda
- Clade: Pancrustacea
- Class: Insecta
- Order: Coleoptera
- Suborder: Polyphaga
- Infraorder: Cucujiformia
- Family: Chrysomelidae
- Genus: Sumitrosis
- Species: S. bondari

Binomial name
- Sumitrosis bondari (Uhmann, 1953)

Synonyms
- Anoplitis bondari Uhmann, 1953

Species of beetle

Sumitrosis bondari is a species of beetle of the family Chrysomelidae. It is found in Brazil (Bahia).

== Biology ==
The recorded food plant is Calopogonium velutinum.
