= Sumitrosis latior =

Scientific classification
- Kingdom: Animalia
- Phylum: Arthropoda
- Clade: Pancrustacea
- Class: Insecta
- Order: Coleoptera
- Suborder: Polyphaga
- Infraorder: Cucujiformia
- Family: Chrysomelidae
- Genus: Sumitrosis
- Species: S. latior

Binomial name
- Sumitrosis latior (Pic, 1932)

Synonyms
- Anoplitis latior Pic, 1932

Species of beetle

Sumitrosis latior is a species of beetle of the family Chrysomelidae. It is found in Brazil (Goiás).

== Biology ==
The food plants is unknown.
