= Sumitrosis trinidadica =

Scientific classification
- Kingdom: Animalia
- Phylum: Arthropoda
- Clade: Pancrustacea
- Class: Insecta
- Order: Coleoptera
- Suborder: Polyphaga
- Infraorder: Cucujiformia
- Family: Chrysomelidae
- Genus: Sumitrosis
- Species: S. trinidadica

Binomial name
- Sumitrosis trinidadica (Uhmann, 1950)

Synonyms
- Anoplitis trinidadica Uhmann, 1950

Species of beetle

Sumitrosis trinidadica is a species of beetle of the family Chrysomelidae. It is found in Trinidad.

== Biology ==
The food plant is unknown.
