= Sumitrosis triplehorni =

Scientific classification
- Kingdom: Animalia
- Phylum: Arthropoda
- Clade: Pancrustacea
- Class: Insecta
- Order: Coleoptera
- Suborder: Polyphaga
- Infraorder: Cucujiformia
- Family: Chrysomelidae
- Genus: Sumitrosis
- Species: S. triplehorni

Binomial name
- Sumitrosis triplehorni Riley, 2015

Species of beetle

Sumitrosis triplehorni is a species of beetle of the family Chrysomelidae. It is found in the United States, where it has only been recorded from the southern part of the Florida peninsula and the Florida Keys.

== Description ==
Adults reach a length of about 2.8–3.4 mm.
