= Sumitrosis heringi =

Scientific classification
- Kingdom: Animalia
- Phylum: Arthropoda
- Clade: Pancrustacea
- Class: Insecta
- Order: Coleoptera
- Suborder: Polyphaga
- Infraorder: Cucujiformia
- Family: Chrysomelidae
- Genus: Sumitrosis
- Species: S. heringi

Binomial name
- Sumitrosis heringi (Uhmann, 1935)

Synonyms
- Anoplitis heringi Uhmann, 1935

Species of beetle

Sumitrosis heringi is a species of beetle of the family Chrysomelidae. It is found in Costa Rica.

== Biology ==
The recorded food plants Chusquea species and bamboo.
