= Sumitrosis chacoensis =

Scientific classification
- Kingdom: Animalia
- Phylum: Arthropoda
- Clade: Pancrustacea
- Class: Insecta
- Order: Coleoptera
- Suborder: Polyphaga
- Infraorder: Cucujiformia
- Family: Chrysomelidae
- Genus: Sumitrosis
- Species: S. chacoensis

Binomial name
- Sumitrosis chacoensis (Uhmann, 1938)

Synonyms
- Anoplitis chacoensis Uhmann, 1938

Species of beetle

Sumitrosis chacoensis is a species of beetle of the family Chrysomelidae. It is found in Argentina.

== Biology ==
The recorded food plants are Phaseolus species.
