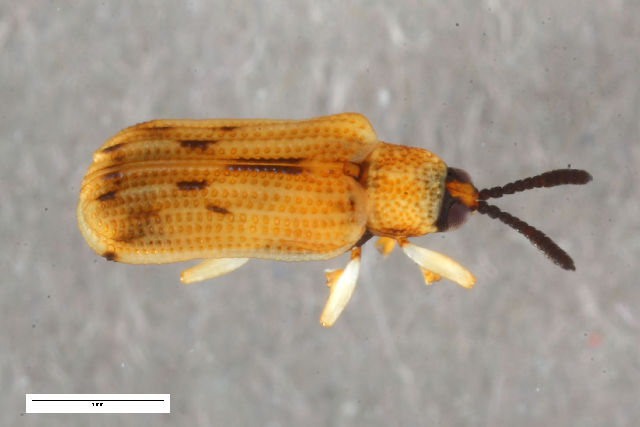

Scientific classification
- Kingdom: Animalia
- Phylum: Arthropoda
- Clade: Pancrustacea
- Class: Insecta
- Order: Coleoptera
- Suborder: Polyphaga
- Infraorder: Cucujiformia
- Family: Chrysomelidae
- Genus: Sumitrosis
- Species: S. pallescens

Binomial name
- Sumitrosis pallescens (Baly, 1885)

Synonyms
- Chalepus pallescens Baly, 1885; Chalepus jansoni Baly, 1885

= Sumitrosis pallescens =

Species of beetle

Sumitrosis pallescens is a species of leaf beetle in the family Chrysomelidae. It is found in Central America and North America, where it has been recorded from the United States (Florida, Louisiana, Maryland, Mississippi, North Carolina, South Carolina, Texas, West Virginia), Costa Rica, Mexico (Guerrero, Tabasco, Tamaulipas, Veracruz), Nicaragua and Panama.

== Description ==
Adults reach a length of about 3.1-3.5 mm. The pronotum and elytra are pale yellow, the latter with some piceous spots towards the apex.

== Biology ==
The recorded food plant is Chamaecrista fasciculata, while adults have been collected on Chamaecrista nictitans.
