= Sumitrosis lebasi =

Scientific classification
- Kingdom: Animalia
- Phylum: Arthropoda
- Clade: Pancrustacea
- Class: Insecta
- Order: Coleoptera
- Suborder: Polyphaga
- Infraorder: Cucujiformia
- Family: Chrysomelidae
- Genus: Sumitrosis
- Species: S. lebasi

Binomial name
- Sumitrosis lebasi (Chapuis, 1877)

Synonyms
- Odontota lebasi Chapuis, 1877; Anoplitis lebasi

Species of beetle

Sumitrosis lebasi is a species of beetle of the family Chrysomelidae. It is found in Bolivia, Brazil and Paraguay.

== Biology ==
The food plant is unknown.
