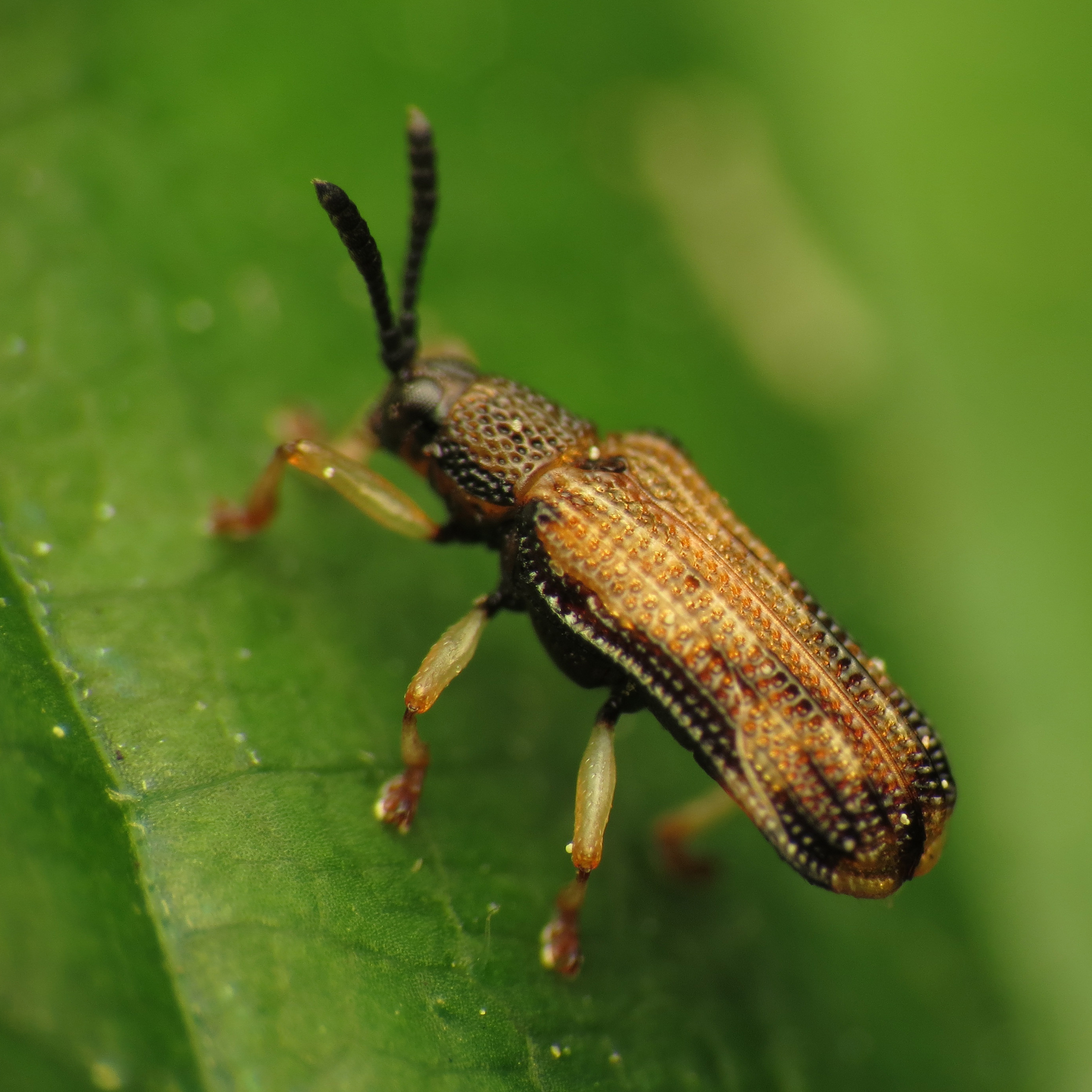

Scientific classification
- Kingdom: Animalia
- Phylum: Arthropoda
- Clade: Pancrustacea
- Class: Insecta
- Order: Coleoptera
- Suborder: Polyphaga
- Infraorder: Cucujiformia
- Family: Chrysomelidae
- Genus: Sumitrosis
- Species: S. inaequalis

Binomial name
- Sumitrosis inaequalis (Weber, 1801)

Synonyms
- Hispa inaequalis Weber, 1801; Hispa suturalis Fabricius, 1801; Hispa obsoleta Say, 1823; Hispa pallida Say, 1823; Hispa flavipes Germar, 1824; Hispa baucis Newman, 1838; Sumitrosis arnetti Butte, 1969

= Sumitrosis inaequalis =

Species of beetle

Sumitrosis inaequalis is a species of leaf beetle in the family Chrysomelidae. It is found in Central America and North America, where it has been recorded from Canada (Alberta, British Columbia, Manitoba, New Brunswick, Nova Scotia, Ontario, Quebec, Prince Edward Island, Saskatchewan) and the United States (Alabama, Arizona, Arkansas, California, Colorado, Connecticut, Delaware, Florida, Georgia, Illinois, Indiana, Iowa, Kansas, Kentucky, Louisiana, Maine, Maryland, Massachusetts, Michigan, Minnesota, Mississippi, Missouri, Montana, Nebraska, New Hampshire, New Jersey, New York, North Carolina, Ohio, Oklahoma, Pennsylvania, Rhode Island, South Carolina, Tennessee, Texas, Utah, Vermont, Virginia, West Virginia, Wisconsin, Wyoming).

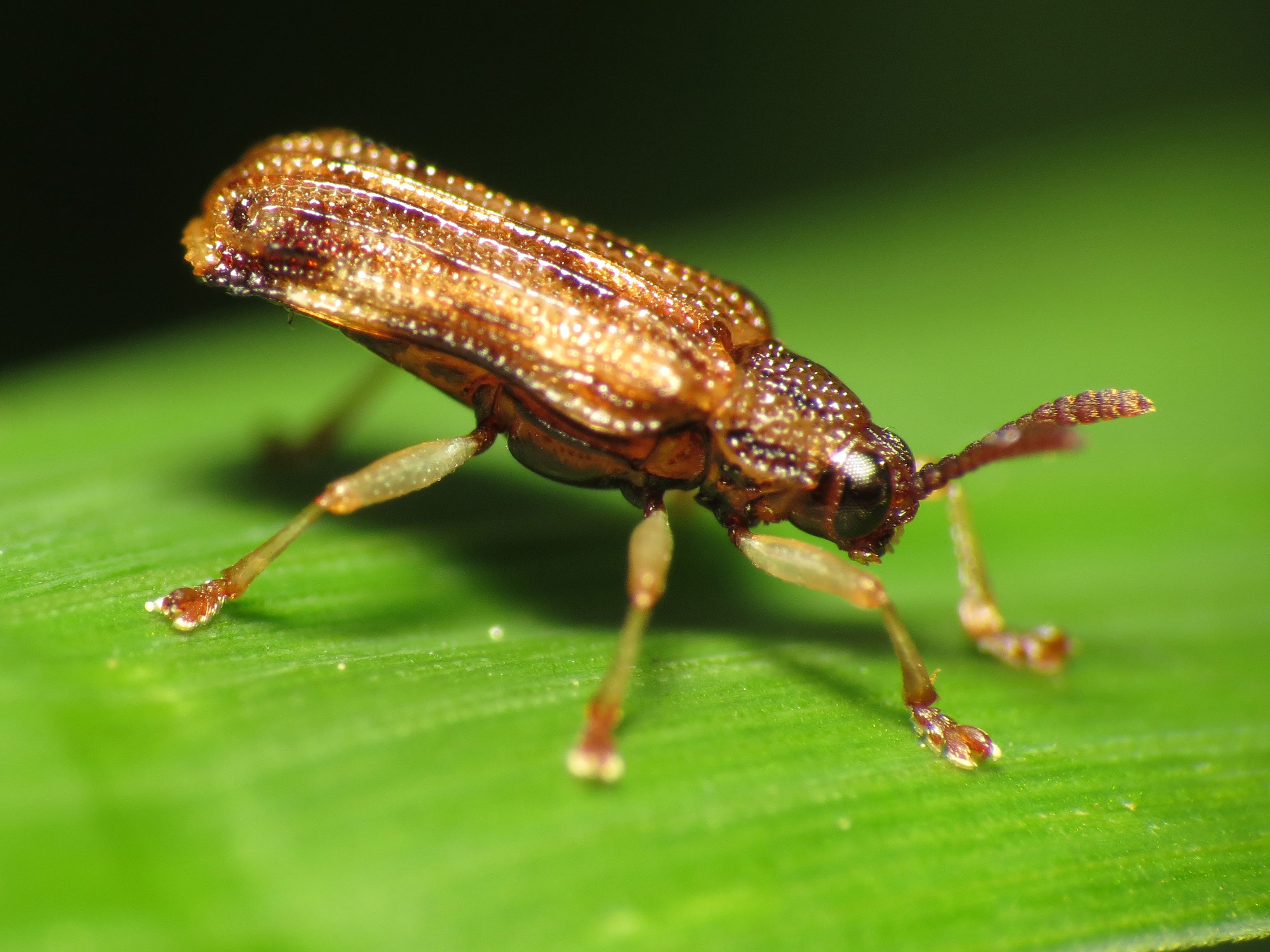

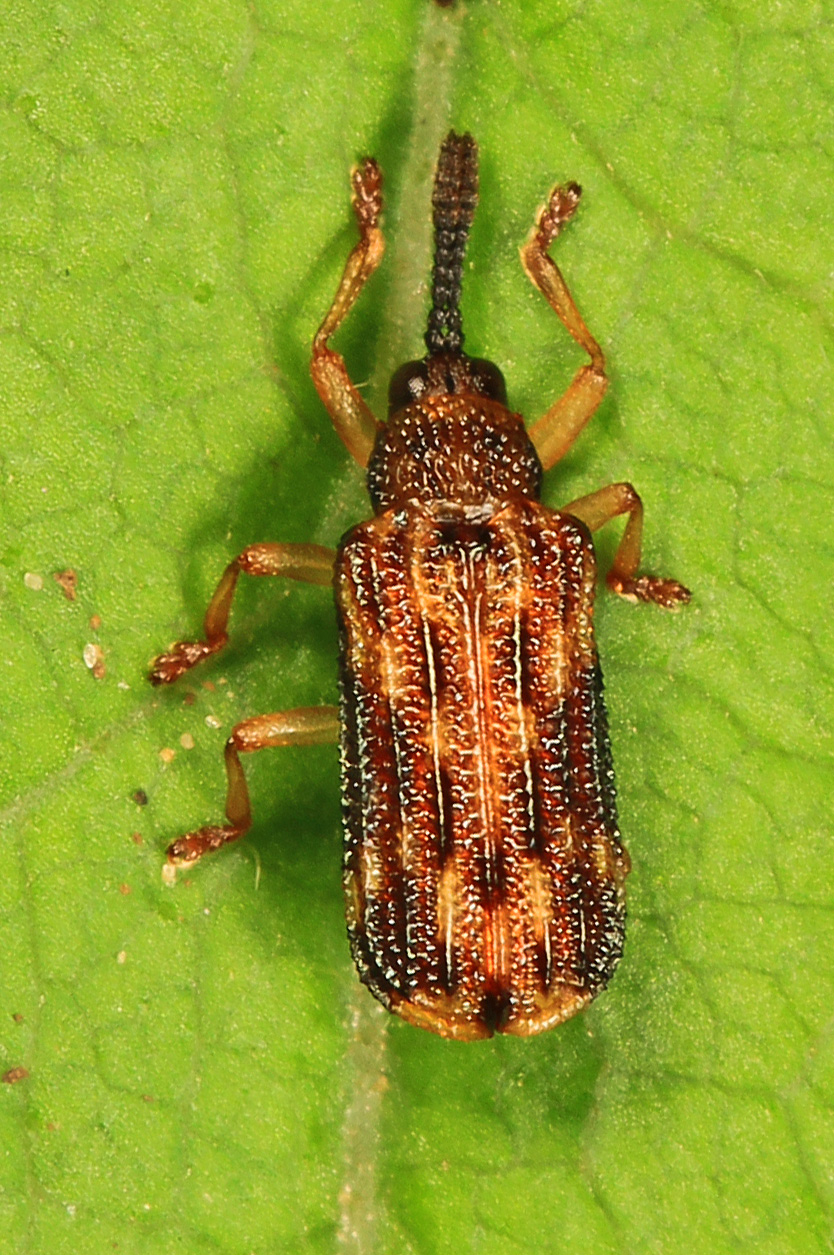

== Description ==
Adults reach a length of about 3.4-4.2 mm. Adults are very variable in colour. The pronotum might be pale or maculate with piceous. The elytra range from pale yellow with faint black markings to black with faint yellow spots.

== Biology ==
The species is a leaf miner on hosts such as Eurybia divaricata, Symphyotrichum cordifolium, and Ambrosia artemisiifolia.
