= Sumitrosis gestroi =

Scientific classification
- Kingdom: Animalia
- Phylum: Arthropoda
- Clade: Pancrustacea
- Class: Insecta
- Order: Coleoptera
- Suborder: Polyphaga
- Infraorder: Cucujiformia
- Family: Chrysomelidae
- Genus: Sumitrosis
- Species: S. gestroi

Binomial name
- Sumitrosis gestroi (Weise, 1906)

Synonyms
- Anoplitis gestroi Weise, 1906

Species of beetle

Sumitrosis gestroi is a species of beetle of the family Chrysomelidae. It is found in Belize, Costa Rica and Nicaragua.

== Biology ==
The food plant is unknown.
