= Sumitrosis obliterata =

Scientific classification
- Kingdom: Animalia
- Phylum: Arthropoda
- Clade: Pancrustacea
- Class: Insecta
- Order: Coleoptera
- Suborder: Polyphaga
- Infraorder: Cucujiformia
- Family: Chrysomelidae
- Genus: Sumitrosis
- Species: S. obliterata

Binomial name
- Sumitrosis obliterata (Chapuis, 1877)

Synonyms
- Odontota obliterata Chapuis, 1877; Anoplitis obliterata

Species of beetle

Sumitrosis obliterata is a species of beetle of the family Chrysomelidae. It is found in Colombia.

== Biology ==
The food plant is unknown.
