= Sumitrosis reichardti =

Scientific classification
- Kingdom: Animalia
- Phylum: Arthropoda
- Clade: Pancrustacea
- Class: Insecta
- Order: Coleoptera
- Suborder: Polyphaga
- Infraorder: Cucujiformia
- Family: Chrysomelidae
- Genus: Sumitrosis
- Species: S. reichardti

Binomial name
- Sumitrosis reichardti (Uhmann, 1968)

Synonyms
- Anoplitis reichardti Uhmann, 1968

Species of beetle

Sumitrosis reichardti is a species of beetle of the family Chrysomelidae. It is found in Brazil (São Paulo).

== Biology ==
The food plant is unknown.
