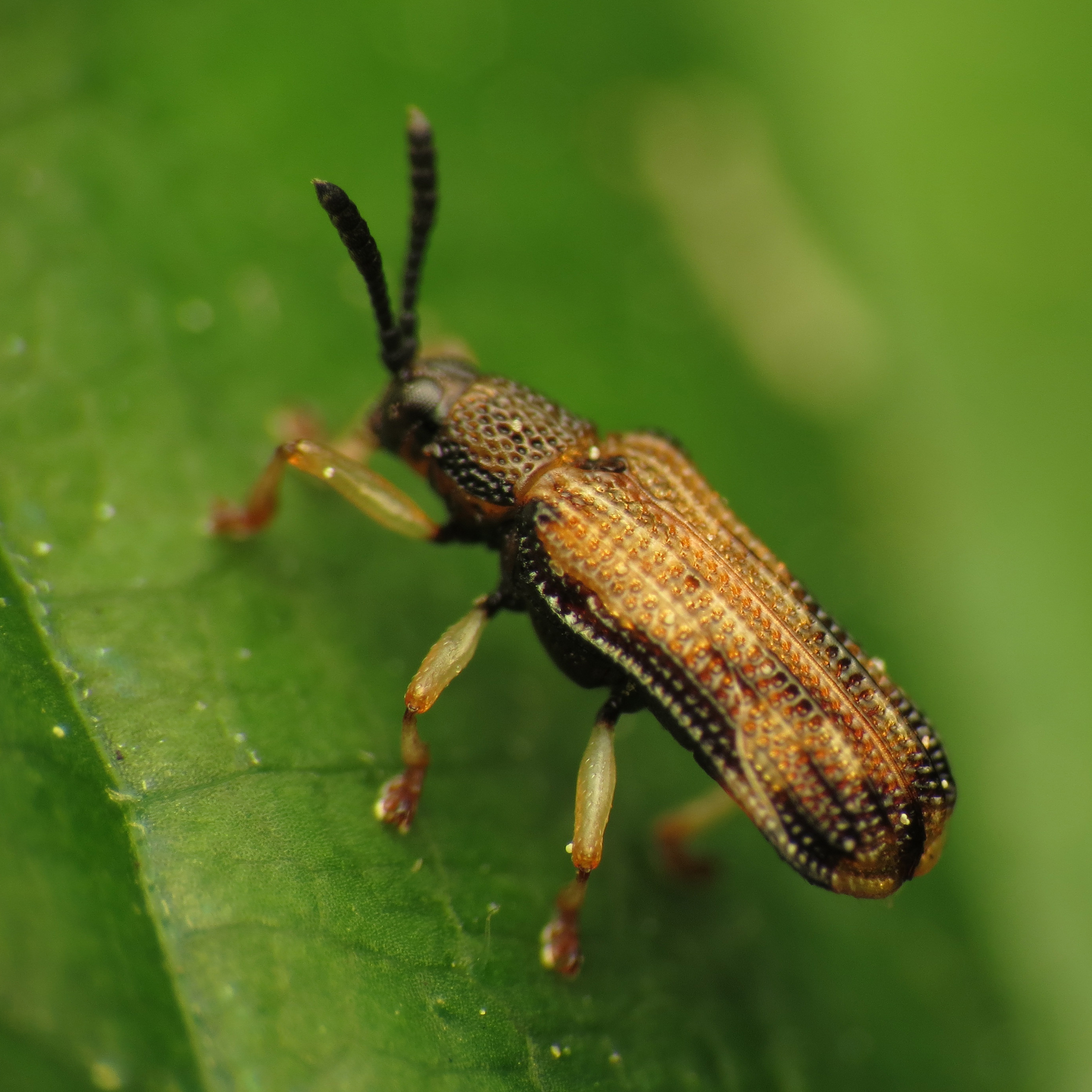
- Sumitrosis inaequalis

Scientific classification
- Kingdom: Animalia
- Phylum: Arthropoda
- Class: Insecta
- Order: Coleoptera
- Suborder: Polyphaga
- Infraorder: Cucujiformia
- Family: Chrysomelidae
- Tribe: Chalepini
- Genus: Sumitrosis; Butte, 1969

Synonyms
- Anoplitis Kirby. Giebel, 1852

= Sumitrosis =

Genus of beetles

Sumitrosis is a genus of leaf beetles in the family Chrysomelidae. There are at least 60 described species in Sumitrosis.

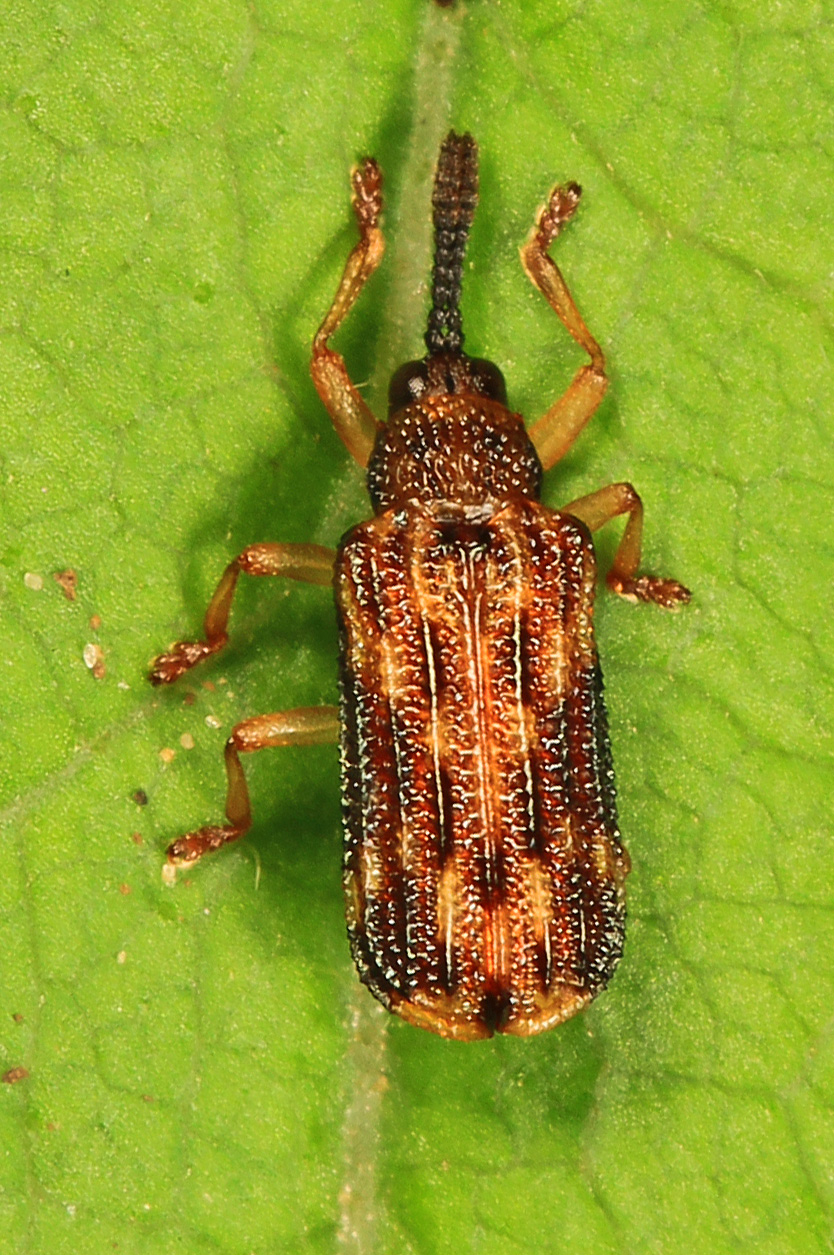
Sumitrosis inaequalis

== Species ==
- Sumitrosis amica (Baly, 1885)
- Sumitrosis ancoroides (Schaeffer, 1933)
- Sumitrosis annulipes (Pic, 1932)
- Sumitrosis bifasciata (Pic, 1929)
- Sumitrosis binotaticollis (Pic, 1929)
- Sumitrosis bondari (Uhmann, 1953)
- Sumitrosis brevenotata (Pic, 1929)
- Sumitrosis breviceps (Baly, 1885)
- Sumitrosis bruchi (Uhmann, 1938)
- Sumitrosis chacoensis (Uhmann, 1938)
- Sumitrosis championi (Weise, 1911)
- Sumitrosis congener (Baly, 1885)
- Sumitrosis curta (Pic, 1929)
- Sumitrosis difficilis (Monrós and Viana, 1947)
- Sumitrosis distinctus (Baly, 1885)
- Sumitrosis diversipes (Baly, 1885)
- Sumitrosis flavipennis (Weise, 1910)
- Sumitrosis fryi (Baly, 1885)
- Sumitrosis fuscicornis (Weise, 1910)
- Sumitrosis germaini (Pic, 1929)
- Sumitrosis gestroi (Weise, 1906)
- Sumitrosis heringi (Uhmann, 1935)
- Sumitrosis imparallela (Pic, 1932)
- Sumitrosis inaequalis (Weber, 1801)
- Sumitrosis instabilis (Baly, 1885)
- Sumitrosis lateapicalis (Pic, 1934)
- Sumitrosis latior (Pic, 1932)
- Sumitrosis lebasi (Chapuis, 1877)
- Sumitrosis lepidula (Weise, 1905)
- Sumitrosis maculata (Uhmann, 1931)
- Sumitrosis marginella (Weise, 1905)
- Sumitrosis minima (Pic, 1932)
- Sumitrosis minuta (Pic, 1932)
- Sumitrosis obidosensis (Pic, 1929)
- Sumitrosis obliterata (Chapuis, 1877)
- Sumitrosis obscura (Chapuis, 1877)
- Sumitrosis octostriata (Chapuis, 1877)
- Sumitrosis opacicollis (Baly, 1885)
- Sumitrosis pallescens (Baly, 1885)
- Sumitrosis parallela (Champion, 1894)
- Sumitrosis peruana (Pic, 1929)
- Sumitrosis picta (Weise, 1910)
- Sumitrosis placida (Baly, 1885)
- Sumitrosis pretiosula (Uhmann, 1961)
- Sumitrosis regularis (Weise, 1905)
- Sumitrosis reichardti (Uhmann, 1968)
- Sumitrosis replexa (Uhmann, 1931)
- Sumitrosis rosea (Weber, 1801) (leafminer beetle)
- Sumitrosis semilimbata (Baly, 1885)
- Sumitrosis signifera (Weise, 1905)
- Sumitrosis steinheili (Chapuis, 1877)
- Sumitrosis subangulata (Chapuis, 1877)
- Sumitrosis terminatus (Baly, 1885)
- Sumitrosis tesseraria (Weise, 1905)
- Sumitrosis testacea (Pic, 1934)
- Sumitrosis tibialis (Baly, 1885)
- Sumitrosis trinidadica (Uhmann, 1950)
- Sumitrosis triplehorni Riley, 2015
- Sumitrosis varians (Uhmann, 1961)
- Sumitrosis weisei Staines, 1993
- Sumitrosis weyrauchi Uhmann, 1967
