= Sumitrosis diversipes =

Scientific classification
- Kingdom: Animalia
- Phylum: Arthropoda
- Clade: Pancrustacea
- Class: Insecta
- Order: Coleoptera
- Suborder: Polyphaga
- Infraorder: Cucujiformia
- Family: Chrysomelidae
- Genus: Sumitrosis
- Species: S. diversipes

Binomial name
- Sumitrosis diversipes (Baly, 1885)

Synonyms
- Chalepus diversipes Baly, 1885; Anoplitis diversipes

Species of beetle

Sumitrosis diversipes is a species of beetle of the family Chrysomelidae. It is found in Mexico (Oaxaca).

== Description ==
The head is moderately produced between the eyes and minutely granulose. The front impressed with a longitudinal groove. The antennae are slender and filiform. The thorax is transverse, the sides converging from base to apex, distinctly angulate, slightly bisinuate. The upper surface is subcylindrical, transversely depressed on the hinder disc, closely covered with large coarse punctures. The elytra are narrowly oblong, slightly dilated apical margin conjointly obtuse, broadly sinuate on either side. The outer margin (the sinuate apices excepted) is serrulate and the upper surface is granulose. Each elytron (at the base and on the medial disc) has eight, at the apex with nine, rows of fine, but distinctly impressed punctures, the second interspace, together with the suture at its apex, strongly costate. The sixth interspace is less strongly elevated.

== Biology ==
The food plant is unknown.
