= Sumitrosis marginella =

Scientific classification
- Kingdom: Animalia
- Phylum: Arthropoda
- Clade: Pancrustacea
- Class: Insecta
- Order: Coleoptera
- Suborder: Polyphaga
- Infraorder: Cucujiformia
- Family: Chrysomelidae
- Genus: Sumitrosis
- Species: S. marginella

Binomial name
- Sumitrosis marginella (Weise, 1905)

Synonyms
- Anoplitis marginella Weise, 1905

Species of beetle

Sumitrosis marginella is a species of beetle of the family Chrysomelidae. It is found in Brazil (Goiás) and Trinidad.

== Biology ==
The recorded food plant is Phaseolus vulgaris.
