= Sumitrosis placida =

Scientific classification
- Kingdom: Animalia
- Phylum: Arthropoda
- Clade: Pancrustacea
- Class: Insecta
- Order: Coleoptera
- Suborder: Polyphaga
- Infraorder: Cucujiformia
- Family: Chrysomelidae
- Genus: Sumitrosis
- Species: S. placida

Binomial name
- Sumitrosis placida (Baly, 1885)

Synonyms
- Chalepus placidus Baly, 1885

Species of beetle

Sumitrosis placida is a species of beetle of the family Chrysomelidae. It is found in Guatemala and Mexico (Jalisco, Tabasco).

== Description ==
The head is smooth and impunctate, the interocular space moderately produced. The antennae are scarcely more than half the length of the body and filiform. The thorax is broader than long, the sides obtusely angulate, straight and parallel from the base to the middle, then obliquely converging to the apex, the anterior angle armed with an oblique obtuse tooth, subcylindrical, broadly flattened and excavated on the hinder disc, closely covered with large, irregular, foveolate punctures. There is an irregular longitudinal space on the middle disc, commencing in front of the transverse depression, and extending anteriorly nearly to the apical margin, shining, impunctate, its medial line impressed with a fine longitudinal groove. A longitudinal vitta, abbreviated anteriorly, together with the extreme edge of the lateral margin, is blackish-piceous. The scutellum is oblong, the sides distinctly, the apex faintly, emarginate. The elytra are parallel, serrulate on the sides, the apex rounded and acutely denticulate. Each elytron has eight, at the extreme base with nine, rows of punctures, tricostate, the suture also elevated.

== Biology ==
The recorded food plant is Helicarpus pallidus.
