= Sumitrosis fuscicornis =

Scientific classification
- Kingdom: Animalia
- Phylum: Arthropoda
- Clade: Pancrustacea
- Class: Insecta
- Order: Coleoptera
- Suborder: Polyphaga
- Infraorder: Cucujiformia
- Family: Chrysomelidae
- Genus: Sumitrosis
- Species: S. fuscicornis

Binomial name
- Sumitrosis fuscicornis (Weise, 1910)

Synonyms
- Anoplitis fuscicornis Weise, 1910; Anoplitis canavaliae Maulik, 1929

Species of beetle

Sumitrosis fuscicornis is a species of beetle of the family Chrysomelidae. It is found in Argentina and Brazil (Bahia).

== Biology ==
The recorded food plants are Canavalia ensiformis, Dolichos lablab, Meibomia aspersa, Meibomia discolor, Phaseolus vulgaris, Phaseolus lunatus, Pueraria lobata, Cajanus indicus, Cajanus cajan and Glycine max.
