= Sumitrosis obidosensis =

Scientific classification
- Kingdom: Animalia
- Phylum: Arthropoda
- Clade: Pancrustacea
- Class: Insecta
- Order: Coleoptera
- Suborder: Polyphaga
- Infraorder: Cucujiformia
- Family: Chrysomelidae
- Genus: Sumitrosis
- Species: S. obidosensis

Binomial name
- Sumitrosis obidosensis (Pic, 1929)

Synonyms
- Anoplitis obidosensis Pic, 1929

Species of beetle

Sumitrosis obidosensis is a species of beetle of the family Chrysomelidae. It is found in Brazil.

== Biology ==
The food plant is unknown.
