= Sumitrosis congener =

Scientific classification
- Kingdom: Animalia
- Phylum: Arthropoda
- Clade: Pancrustacea
- Class: Insecta
- Order: Coleoptera
- Suborder: Polyphaga
- Infraorder: Cucujiformia
- Family: Chrysomelidae
- Genus: Sumitrosis
- Species: S. congener

Binomial name
- Sumitrosis congener (Baly, 1885)

Synonyms
- Chalepus congener Baly, 1885; Anoplitis congener

Species of beetle

Sumitrosis congener is a species of beetle of the family Chrysomelidae. It is found in Costa Rica and Panama.

== Description ==
The vertex is smooth and impunctate and the front is broadly sulcate and piceo-fulvous. The interocular space is rather strongly produced and obtuse. The antennae are less than half the length of the body, robust, subfusiform, and attenuated at the base and apex. The thorax is slightly broader than long, the sides subangulate, straight and nearly parallel from the base to the middle, then obliquely converging towards the apex, transversely convex, depressed behind the middle, and coarsely and closely punctured. The elytra is broader than the thorax, the sides parallel, slightly dilated towards the apex, the latter rounded, conjointly subangulate emarginate at the suture. Each elytron has eight, at the extreme base with nine, rows of large, deep punctures, the second interspace rather strongly, and the suture together with the fourth and sixth interspaces moderately, costate.

== Biology ==
The food plant is unknown.
