= Sumitrosis parallela =

Scientific classification
- Kingdom: Animalia
- Phylum: Arthropoda
- Clade: Pancrustacea
- Class: Insecta
- Order: Coleoptera
- Suborder: Polyphaga
- Infraorder: Cucujiformia
- Family: Chrysomelidae
- Genus: Sumitrosis
- Species: S. parallela

Binomial name
- Sumitrosis parallela (Champion, 1894)

Synonyms
- Chalepus parallela Champion, 1894

Species of beetle

Sumitrosis parallela is a species of beetle of the family Chrysomelidae. It is found in Mexico (Veracruz).

== Biology ==
The food plant is unknown.
