= Sumitrosis breviceps =

Scientific classification
- Kingdom: Animalia
- Phylum: Arthropoda
- Clade: Pancrustacea
- Class: Insecta
- Order: Coleoptera
- Suborder: Polyphaga
- Infraorder: Cucujiformia
- Family: Chrysomelidae
- Genus: Sumitrosis
- Species: S. breviceps

Binomial name
- Sumitrosis breviceps (Baly, 1885)

Synonyms
- Chalepus breviceps Baly, 1885; Anoplitis breviceps

Species of beetle

Sumitrosis breviceps is a species of beetle of the family Chrysomelidae. It is found in Panama.

== Description ==
The head is short and rotundate and the clypeus is very short and transverse. The interocular space is obsoletely produced. The antennae are robust, equal in length to the head and thorax. The thorax is transverse and subcylindrical, the sides straight and parallel from the base to the middle, then very slightly converging towards the apex, armed just behind the latter with a minute tooth, the anterior angle with an oblique obtuse tooth. The disc is transversely depressed behind, deeply and somewhat closely punctured. The elytra are oblong, slightly dilated towards the posterior apices conjointly obtuse, the hinder angle distinct. The sides are minutely, while the apical angle and margin are obsoletely serrulate. The posterior angle is armed with one or two coarser serratures than those on the sides. Each elytron has eight, at the extreme base with nine, regular rows of punctures, the second, fourth, and sixth interspaces, together with the suture, costate.

== Biology ==
The food plant is unknown.
