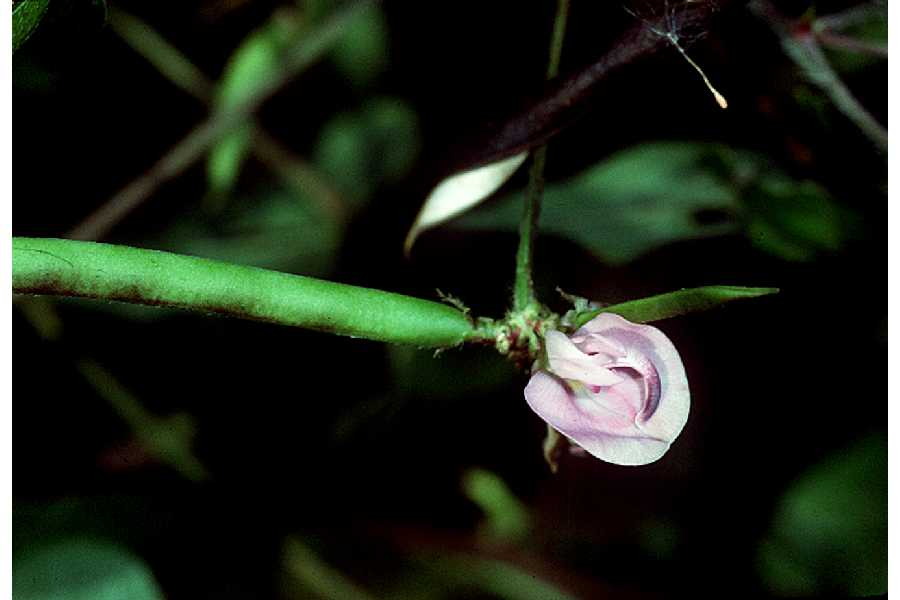

Scientific classification
- Kingdom: Plantae
- Clade: Tracheophytes
- Clade: Angiosperms
- Clade: Eudicots
- Clade: Rosids
- Order: Fabales
- Family: Fabaceae
- Subfamily: Faboideae
- Clade: Millettioids
- Tribe: Phaseoleae
- Subtribe: Phaseolinae
- Genus: Strophostyles; Elliott, 1823

Species
- Strophostyles helvola (L.) Elliott, 1823; Strophostyles leiosperma (Torrey & A. Gray) Piper, 1926; Strophostyles umbellata (Muhl. ex Willd.) Britton, 1897

Synonyms
- Phasellus Medik., 1787; Phaseolus sect. Strophostyles (Elliott) DC., 1825; Phaseolus sect. Strophostyles (Elliott) DC. subsect. Lobatifolii DC.,1825; Phaseolus sect. Strophostyles (Elliott) DC. subsect. Integrifolii DC.,1825; Phaseolus sect. Strophostyles (Elliott) DC. emend. Benth., 1837

= Strophostyles =

Genus of legumes

Strophostyles is monophyletic three-species genus of flowering plants in the family Fabaceae, subfamily Faboideae. Common names for the genus include wild bean and fuzzybean (due to their pubescent pods and seed coverings). It consists of annual and perennial herbaceous vines, ranging in their native distribution from Nevada, east to Florida, and north to the Great Lakes and eastern Canada. The etymology of the name is strophe (turning) + stylos (style), referring to the curve of the style within the keel petal.

== Distinctive traits ==
Strophostyles is the only genus within subtribe Phaseolinae (e.g., Phaseolus, Vigna, Lablab) with a native distribution center in the United States. Like other Phaseolinae, the keel petal of its papilionoid flowers are curled inward to the right, although in Strophostyles and a few other genera only the very tip of the keel is coiled.

== Ecology ==
Strophostyles typically inhabits sites near freshwater or saline reservoirs (e.g., ponds, ditches, coastal dunes, etc.), sand prairies, and ruderal sites. The seeds are eaten by birds and rodents, which may serve as a dispersal mechanism, though their distribution throughout ruderal, disturbed sites suggests unintentional human distribution as well.

== Ethnobotany ==
Strophostyles helvola has been used by Native North Americans for food and medicine. The Choctaw consumed boiled, mashed roots, and archaeological evidence suggests that their seeds were consumed as well, which are smaller but with a similar nutrition profile to Phaseolus vulgaris. The Houma made a decoction of the seeds to treat typhoid, and the Iroquois applied leaves to treat poison ivy rashes and warts.

== Species ==
Recognized species are supported by:

- Strophostyles helvola (L.) Elliot (legitimate name; but variously called S. helvula)
- Strophostyles leiosperma (Torrey & A. Gray) Piper
- Strophostyles umbellata (Muhl. ex Willd.) Britton

Species identification is still ambiguous due to similar morphological characters and potential interspecific hybridization.

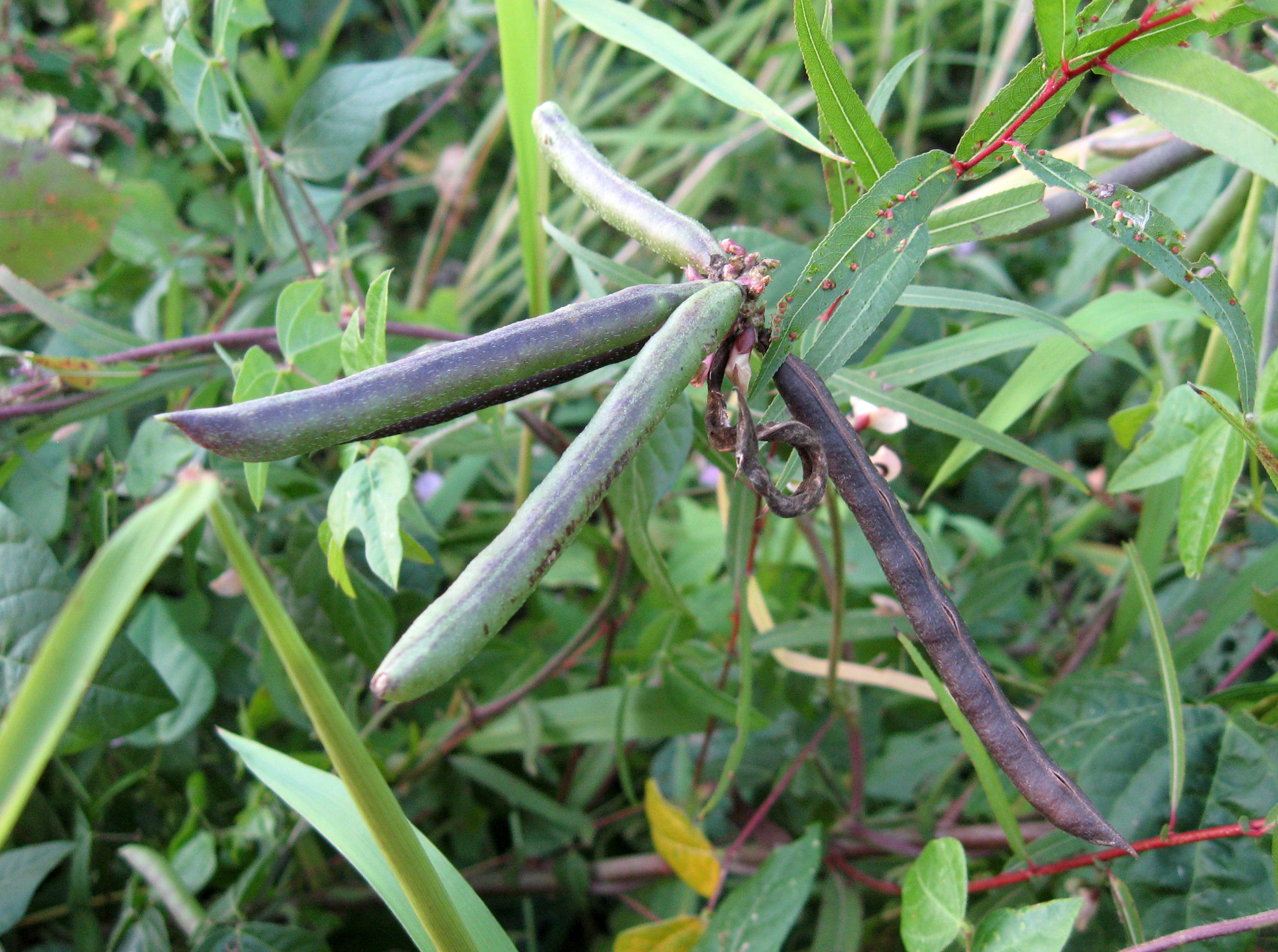

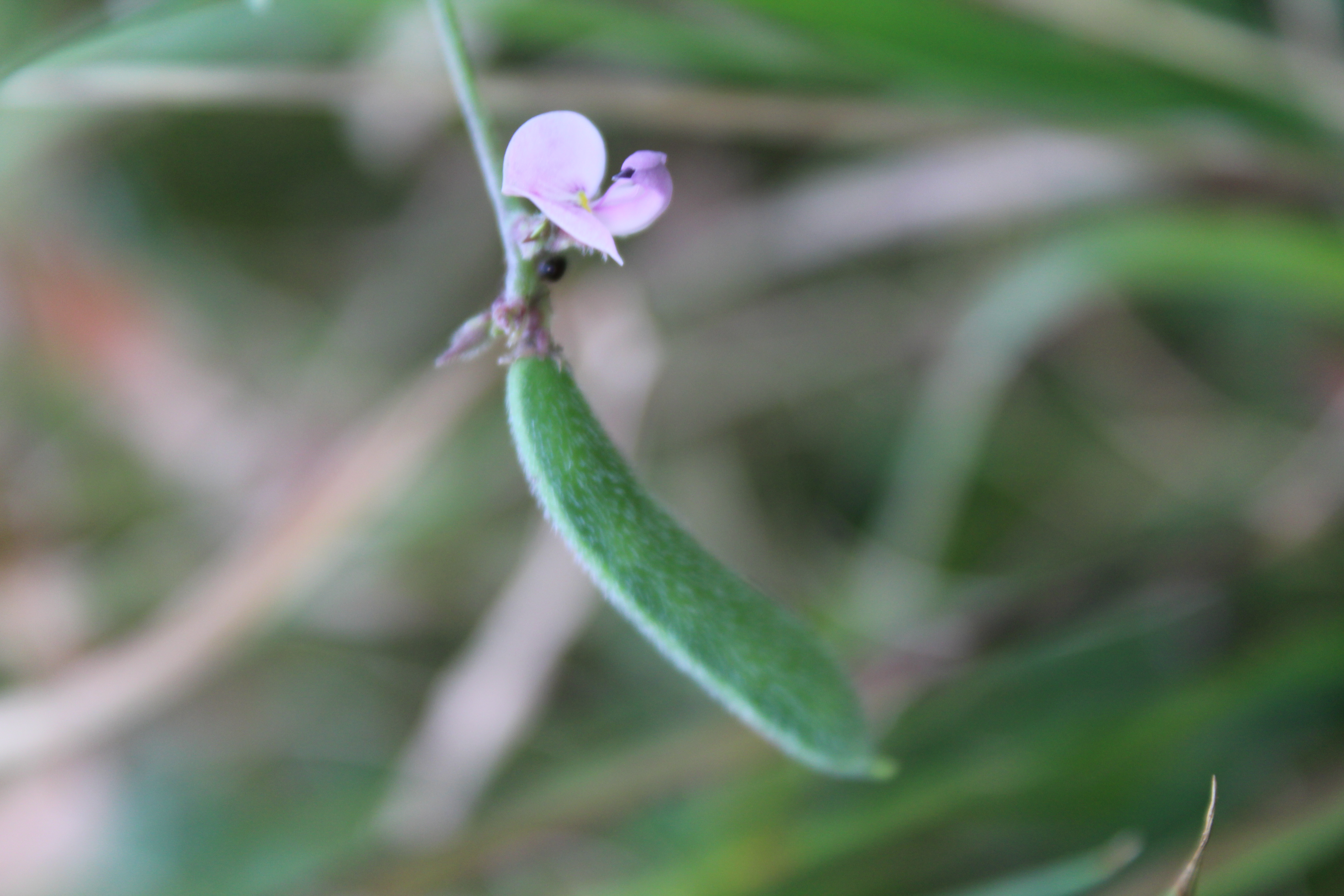

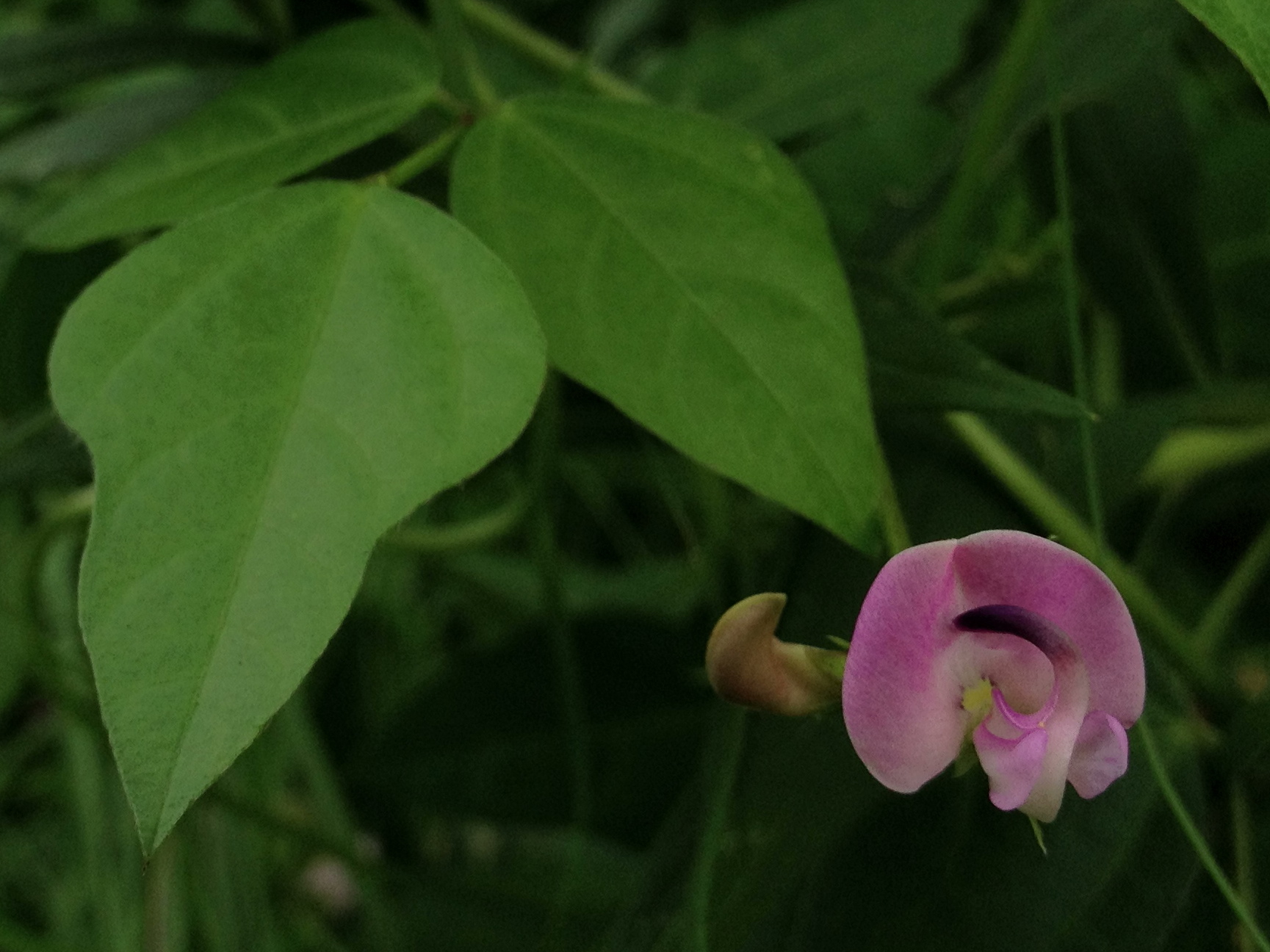

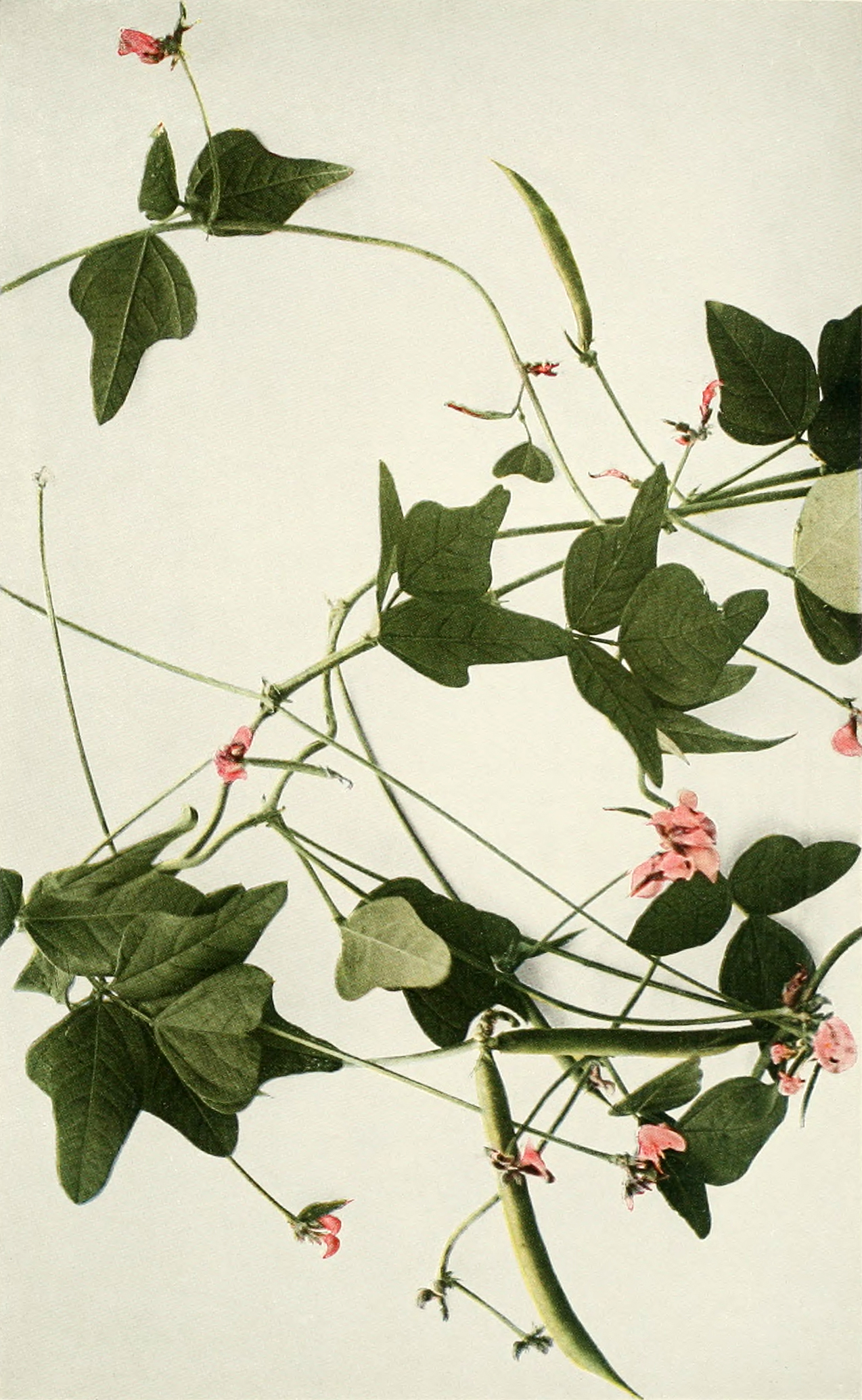

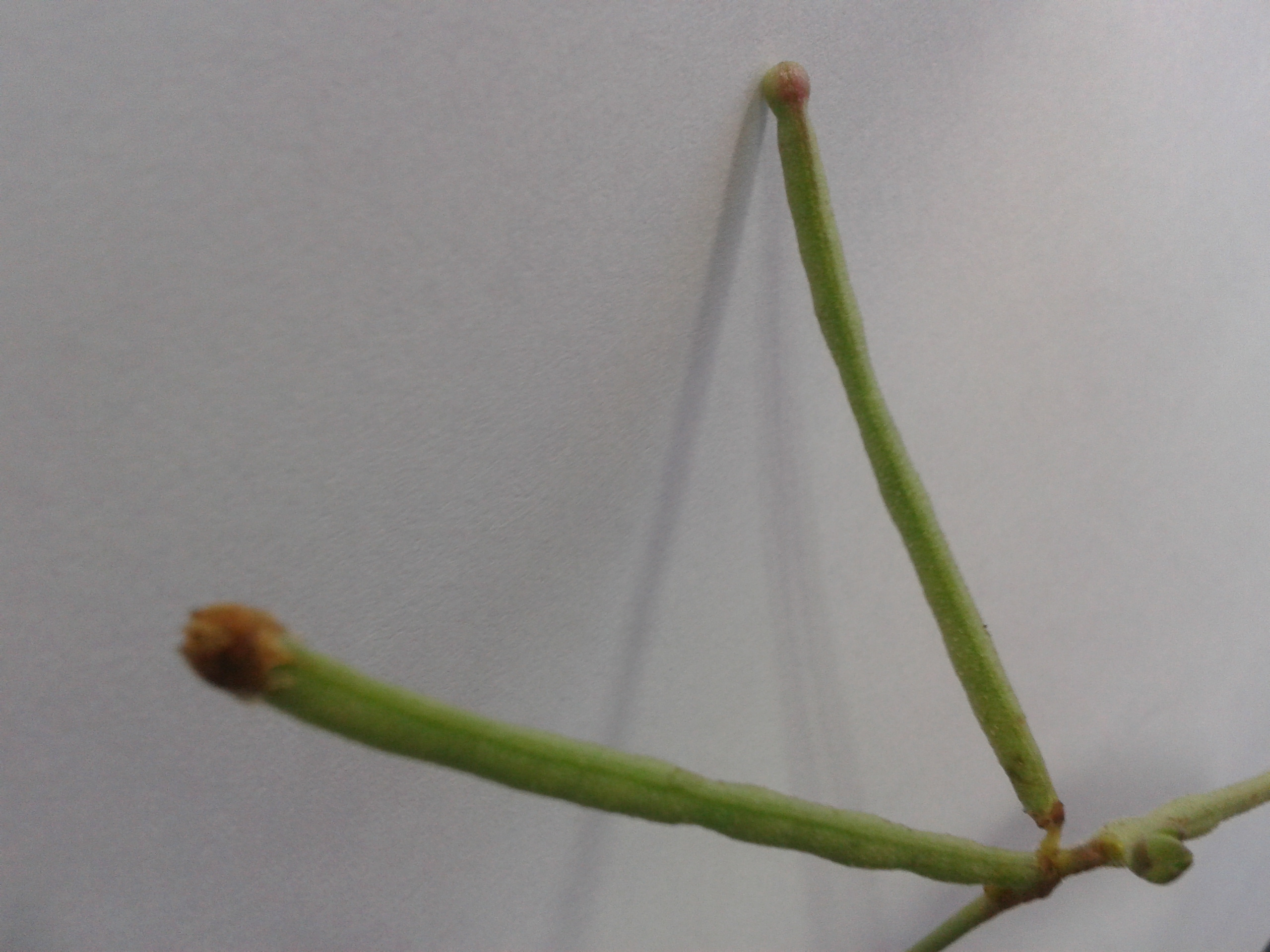

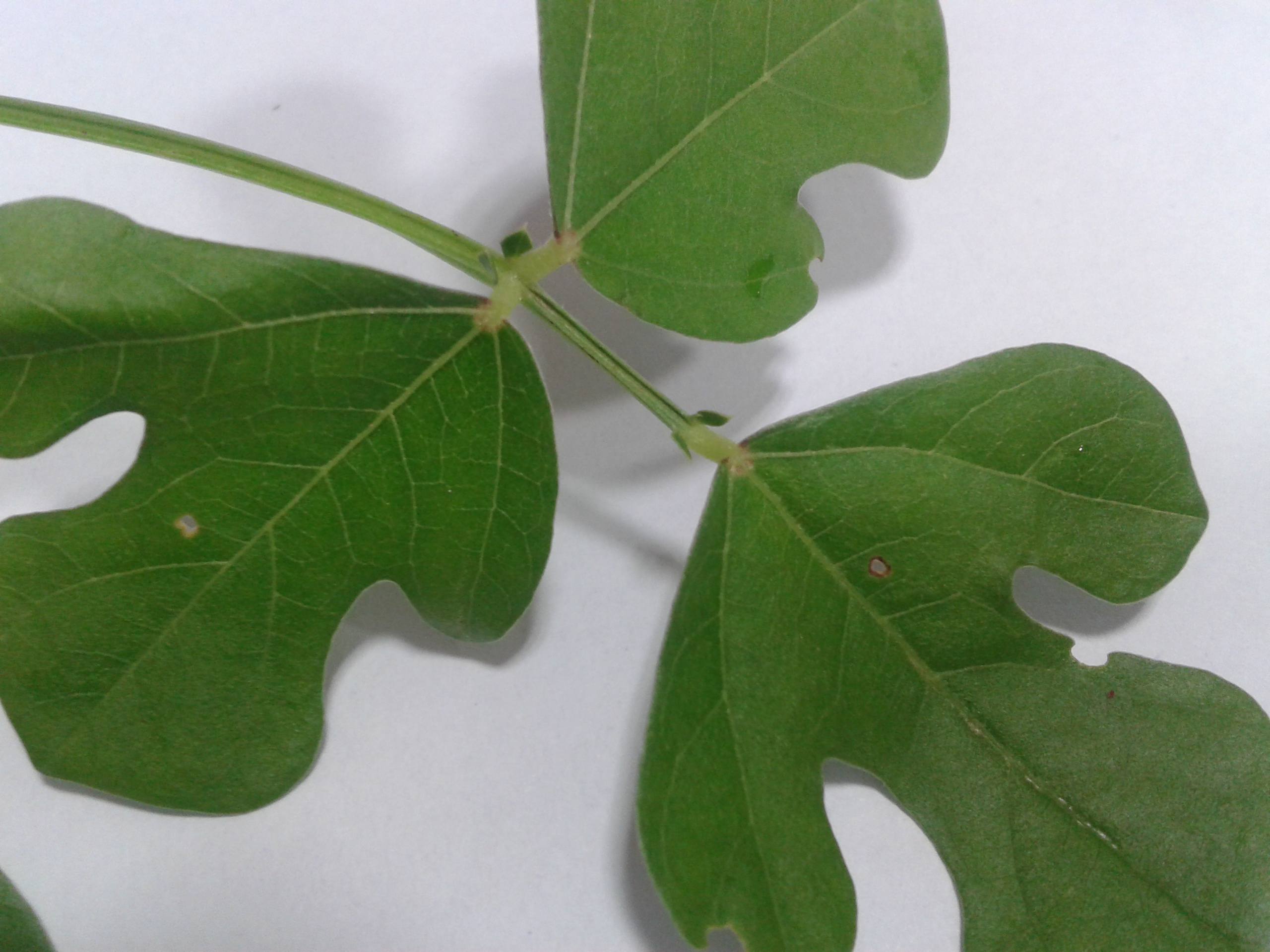

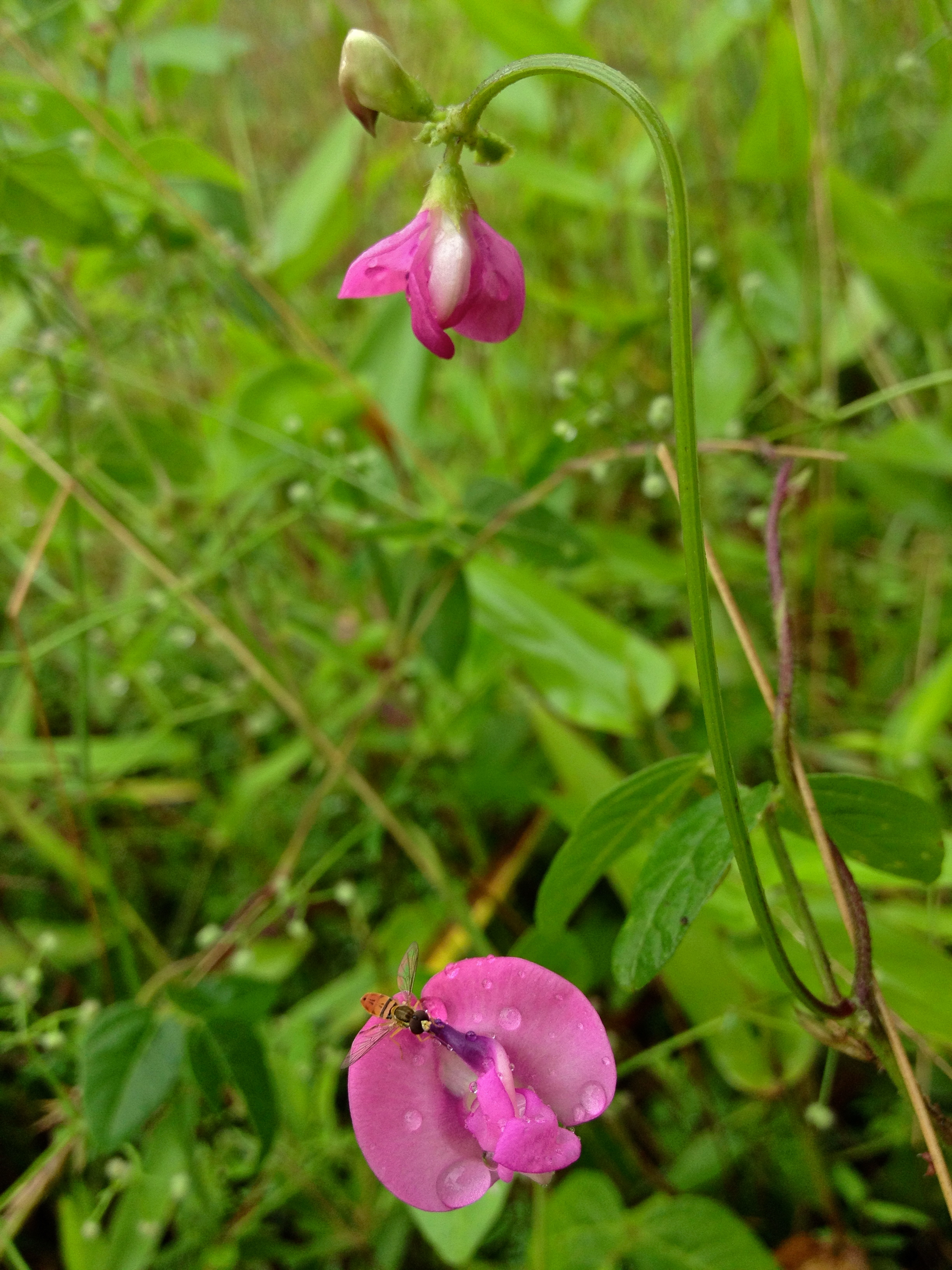

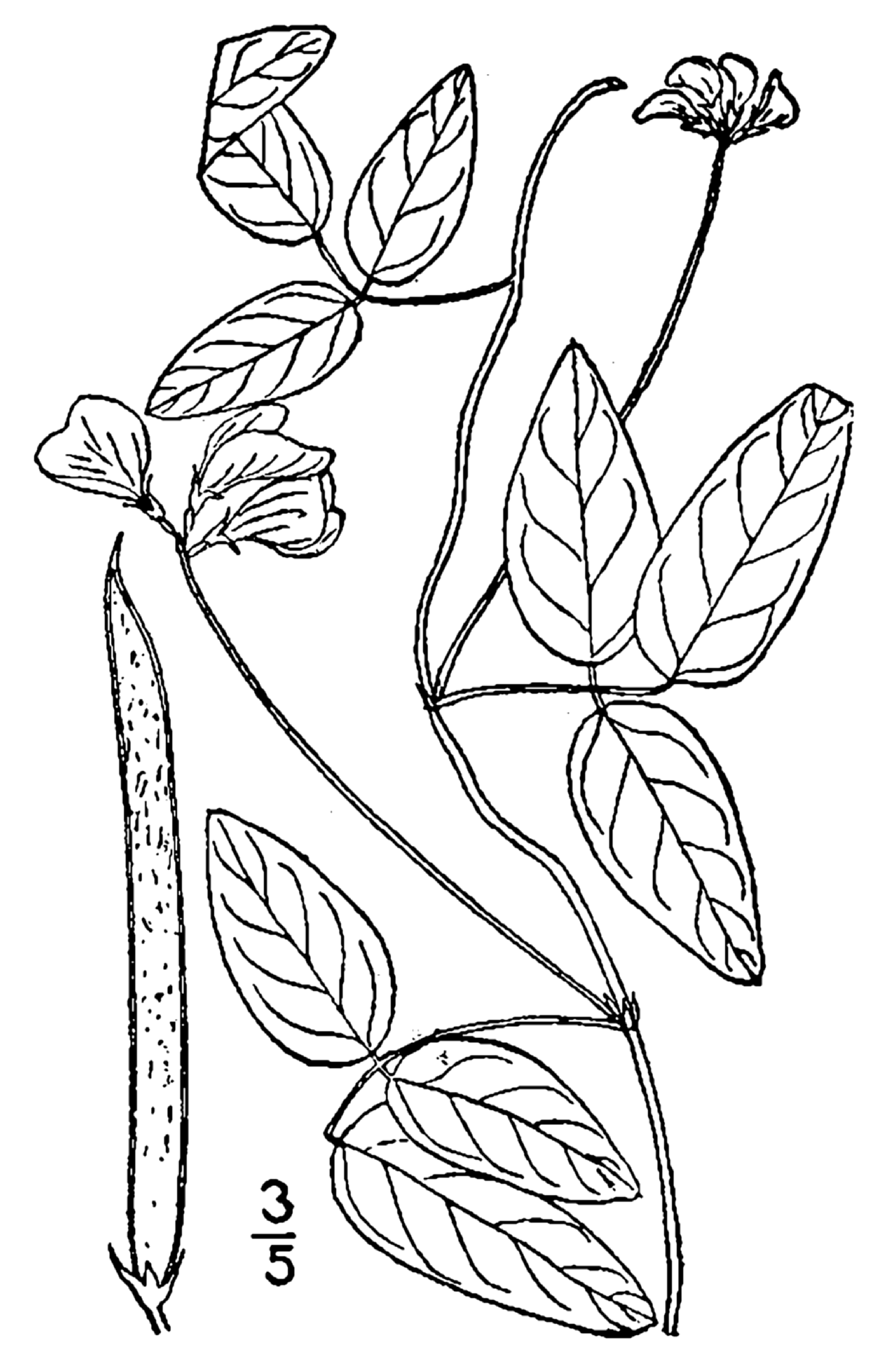

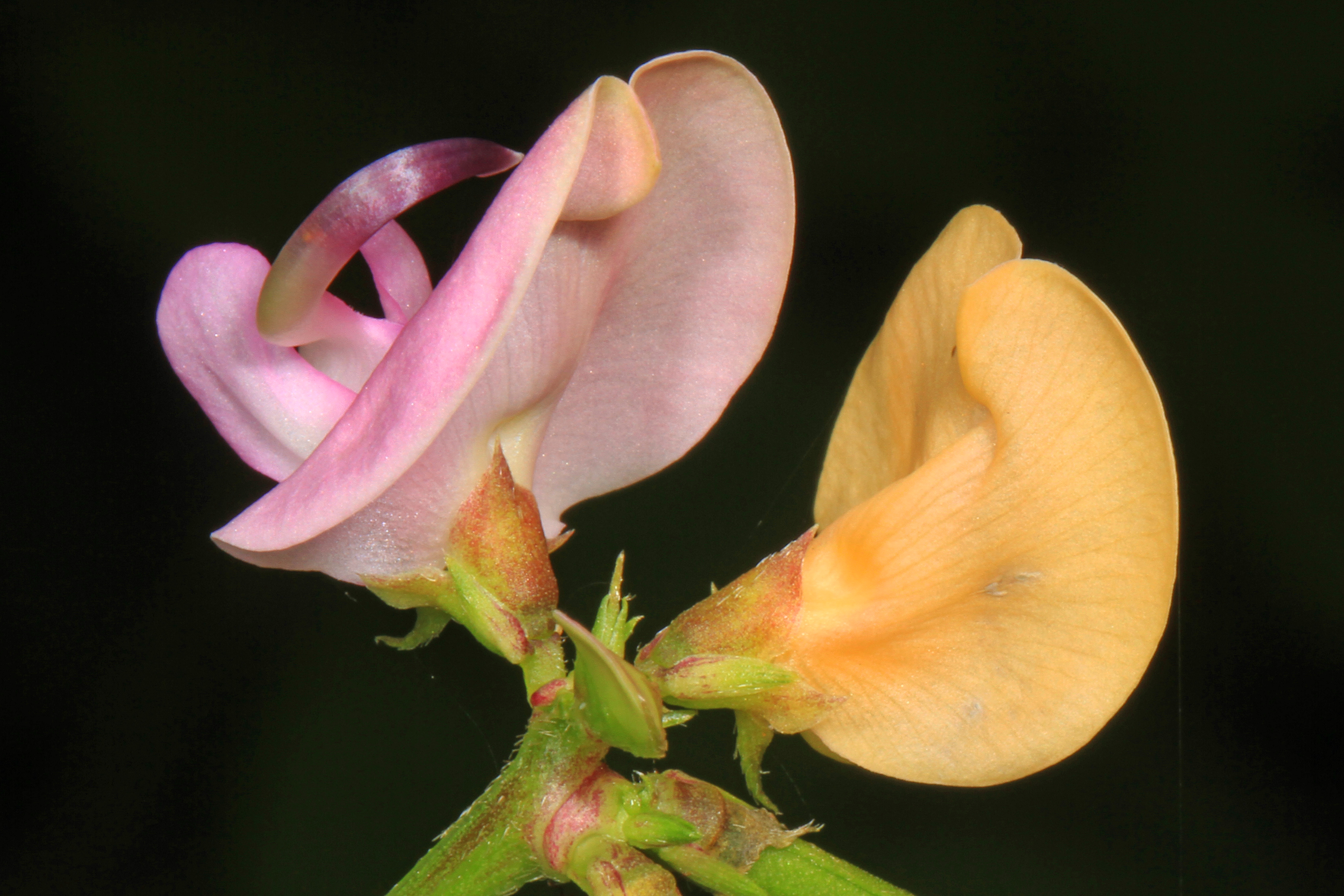

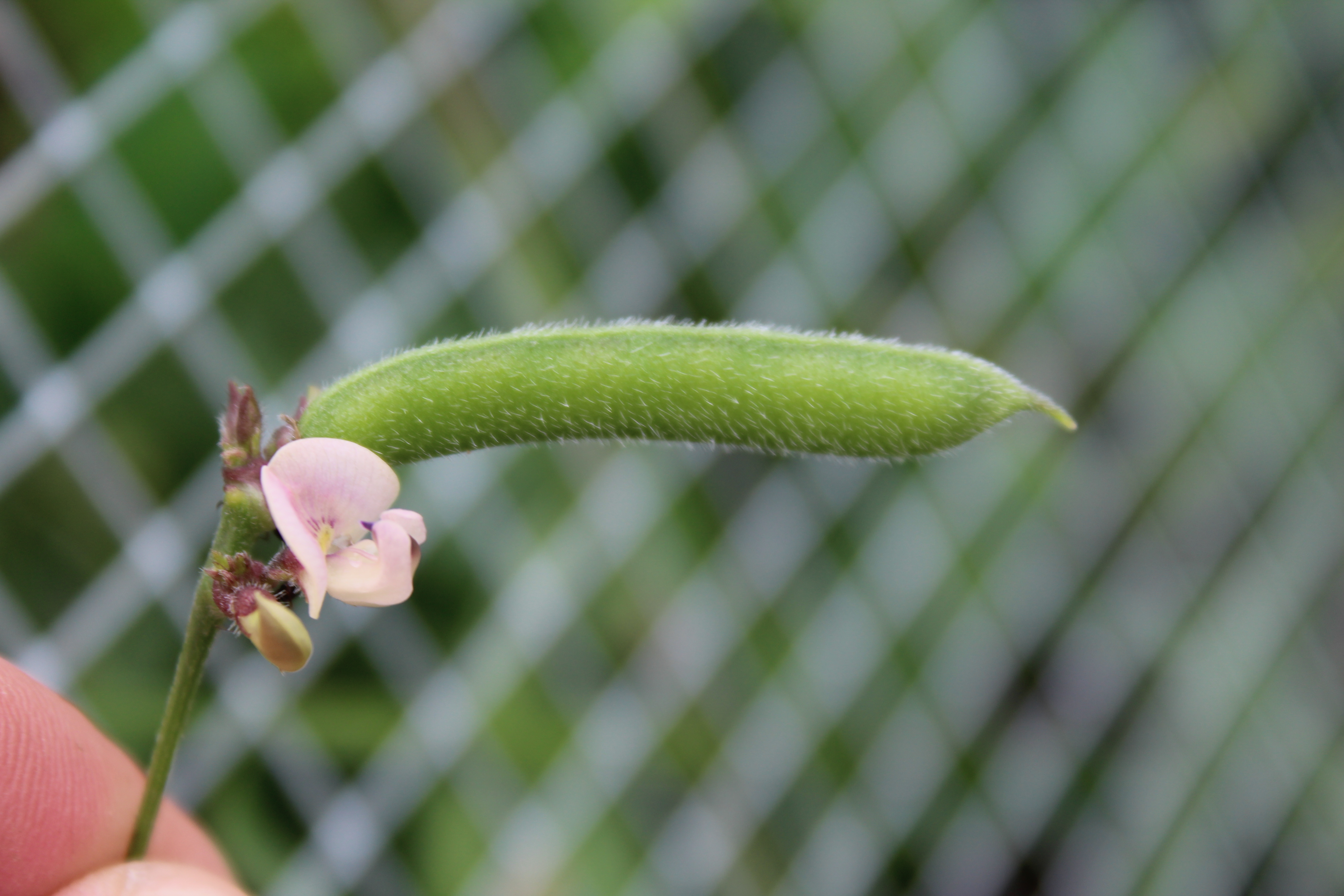
