= Sumitrosis semilimbata =

Scientific classification
- Kingdom: Animalia
- Phylum: Arthropoda
- Clade: Pancrustacea
- Class: Insecta
- Order: Coleoptera
- Suborder: Polyphaga
- Infraorder: Cucujiformia
- Family: Chrysomelidae
- Genus: Sumitrosis
- Species: S. semilimbata

Binomial name
- Sumitrosis semilimbata (Baly, 1885)

Synonyms
- Chalepus semilimbata Baly, 1885; Chalepus semilimbatus

Species of beetle

Sumitrosis semilimbata is a species of beetle of the family Chrysomelidae. It is found in Mexico (Veracruz).

== Description ==
The vertex and front are impressed with a deep longitudinal fovea, and the interocular space is moderately produced. The antennae are about one third the length of the body, slightly but distinctly thickened towards the apex. The thorax is transverse, the sides rounded, nearly straight and parallel behind the middle, then rounded and converging towards the apex, deeply sinuate behind the anterior angle, the latter produced laterally into a short, acute tooth, transversely convex, rather deeply excavated in front of the scutellum, deeply and rather closely punctured. The elytra are subelongate, parallel, obtusely rounded at the apex and finely serrulate. Each elytron has eight rows of deep punctures, the sixth row obsolete on the middle disc, the second and fourth interspaces broadly, the sixth less strongly, costate. The lateral margin is narrowly edged with blackish aeneous.

== Biology ==
The food plant is unknown.
