= Sumitrosis terminatus =

Scientific classification
- Kingdom: Animalia
- Phylum: Arthropoda
- Clade: Pancrustacea
- Class: Insecta
- Order: Coleoptera
- Suborder: Polyphaga
- Infraorder: Cucujiformia
- Family: Chrysomelidae
- Genus: Sumitrosis
- Species: S. terminatus

Binomial name
- Sumitrosis terminatus (Baly, 1885)

Synonyms
- Chalepus terminatus Baly, 1885; Anoplitis terminatus laetifica Weise, 1905; Chalepus saundersi Baly, 1885; Anoplitis terminatus subapicalis Pic, 1929

Species of beetle

Sumitrosis terminatus is a species of beetle of the family Chrysomelidae. It is found in Belize, Colombia, Costa Rica, Guatemala, Mexico (Tabasco, Veracruz) and Panama.

== Description ==
The head is smooth and impunctate, the front impressed with three short longitudinal grooves and the interocular space is moderately produced. The antennae are nearly half the length of the body, filiform, rather slender and slightly thickened towards the apex. The thorax is rather broader than long and subconical, the sides converging from the base to the apex, transversely convex, transversely depressed on the hinder disc, closely punctured. The hinder margin is elevated. The elytra are broader than the sides, parallel and very slightly enlarged towards the posterior angle. The apex is obtusely rounded, the outer margin nearly entire, obsoletely serrulate behind the middle and at the apex. Each elytron has eight, at the extreme base with nine, rows of large, deep punctres, the second, fourth, and sixth interspaces moderately costate.

== Biology ==
The recorded food plants are Fabaceae species.
