= Sumitrosis championi =

Scientific classification
- Kingdom: Animalia
- Phylum: Arthropoda
- Clade: Pancrustacea
- Class: Insecta
- Order: Coleoptera
- Suborder: Polyphaga
- Infraorder: Cucujiformia
- Family: Chrysomelidae
- Genus: Sumitrosis
- Species: S. championi

Binomial name
- Sumitrosis championi (Weise, 1911)

Synonyms
- Chalepus flavipes Champion, 1894 (preocc.); Baliosus championi Weise, 1911

Species of beetle

Sumitrosis championi is a species of beetle of the family Chrysomelidae. It is found in Mexico (Morelos).

== Biology ==
The food plant is unknown.
