= Sumitrosis instabilis =

Scientific classification
- Kingdom: Animalia
- Phylum: Arthropoda
- Clade: Pancrustacea
- Class: Insecta
- Order: Coleoptera
- Suborder: Polyphaga
- Infraorder: Cucujiformia
- Family: Chrysomelidae
- Genus: Sumitrosis
- Species: S. instabilis

Binomial name
- Sumitrosis instabilis (Baly, 1885)

Synonyms
- Chalepus instabilis Baly, 1885; Anoplitis instabilis

Species of beetle

Sumitrosis instabilis is a species of beetle of the family Chrysomelidae. It is found in Costa Rica, Guatemala and Mexico (Oaxaca, Veracruz).

== Description ==
The head is smooth and impunctate, the interocular space moderately produced. The vertex is sometimes black. The antennae are more than one third the length of the body, filiform and very slightly thickened towards the apex. The thorax is transverse, the sides very slightly converging from the base to the apex, obsoletely angulate. The upper surface is subcylindrical, flattened on either side of the medial disc, leaving (in some specimens) a narrow, ill-defined, longitudinal ridge. The elytra is narrowly oblong, very slightly increasing in width from the base to the posterior angle, regularly rounded at the apex, the outer margin finely serrulate. Each elytron has eight, at the extreme base and at the apex with nine, rows of punctures, the second, fourth, and sixth interspaces, together with the suture, costate.

== Biology ==
The food plant is unknown.
