= Sumitrosis pretiosula =

Scientific classification
- Kingdom: Animalia
- Phylum: Arthropoda
- Clade: Pancrustacea
- Class: Insecta
- Order: Coleoptera
- Suborder: Polyphaga
- Infraorder: Cucujiformia
- Family: Chrysomelidae
- Genus: Sumitrosis
- Species: S. pretiosula

Binomial name
- Sumitrosis pretiosula (Uhmann, 1961)

Synonyms
- Anoplitis pretiosula Uhmann, 1961

Species of beetle

Sumitrosis pretiosula is a species of beetle of the family Chrysomelidae. It is found in Bolivia.

== Biology ==
The food plant is unknown.
