= Sumitrosis varians =

Scientific classification
- Kingdom: Animalia
- Phylum: Arthropoda
- Clade: Pancrustacea
- Class: Insecta
- Order: Coleoptera
- Suborder: Polyphaga
- Infraorder: Cucujiformia
- Family: Chrysomelidae
- Genus: Sumitrosis
- Species: S. varians

Binomial name
- Sumitrosis varians (Uhmann, 1961)

Synonyms
- Anoplitis varians Uhmann, 1961

Species of beetle

Sumitrosis varians is a species of beetle of the family Chrysomelidae. It is found in Colombia.

== Biology ==
The food plant is unknown.
