= Sumitrosis distinctus =

Scientific classification
- Kingdom: Animalia
- Phylum: Arthropoda
- Clade: Pancrustacea
- Class: Insecta
- Order: Coleoptera
- Suborder: Polyphaga
- Infraorder: Cucujiformia
- Family: Chrysomelidae
- Genus: Sumitrosis
- Species: S. distinctus

Binomial name
- Sumitrosis distinctus (Baly, 1885)

Synonyms
- Chalepus distinctus Baly, 1885; Anoplitis distinctus

Species of beetle

Sumitrosis distinctus is a species of beetle of the family Chrysomelidae. It is found in Belize, Colombia, Costa Rica, Guatemala, Mexico (Guerrero, Morelos, Tabasco, Tamaulipas, Veracruz), Nicaragua and Panama.

== Description ==
The face is only moderately produced between the eyes, front trisulcate. The antennae are less than half the length of the body, thickened towards the apex. The thorax is slightly broader than long, the sides obsoletely angulate, nearly straight and parallel at the base, obliquely converging before the middle. The disc is subcylindrical and closely foveolate-punctate, the lateral margins, and also a few of the punctures on either side of the middle disc, black. A patch just in front of the scutellum, together with the apical margin, piceous. The elytra are oblong, parallel, obtusely rounded at the apex, the outer margin minutely serrulate, the serratures rather coarser near the hinder angle, the latter rounded. Each elytron has eight, at the extreme base with nine, rows of large deep punctures, the second, fourth, and sixth interspaces costate, the fifth also elevated at its base.

== Biology ==
The food plant is unknown.
