= Sumitrosis lateapicalis =

Scientific classification
- Kingdom: Animalia
- Phylum: Arthropoda
- Clade: Pancrustacea
- Class: Insecta
- Order: Coleoptera
- Suborder: Polyphaga
- Infraorder: Cucujiformia
- Family: Chrysomelidae
- Genus: Sumitrosis
- Species: S. lateapicalis

Binomial name
- Sumitrosis lateapicalis (Pic, 1934)

Synonyms
- Anoplitis lateapicalis Pic, 1934

Species of beetle

Sumitrosis lateapicalis is a species of beetle of the family Chrysomelidae. It is found in Brazil.

== Biology ==
The food plants is unknown.
