= Sumitrosis fryi =

Scientific classification
- Kingdom: Animalia
- Phylum: Arthropoda
- Clade: Pancrustacea
- Class: Insecta
- Order: Coleoptera
- Suborder: Polyphaga
- Infraorder: Cucujiformia
- Family: Chrysomelidae
- Genus: Sumitrosis
- Species: S. fryi

Binomial name
- Sumitrosis fryi (Baly, 1885)

Synonyms
- Chalepus fryi Baly, 1885; Anoplitis fryi

Species of beetle

Sumitrosis fryi is a species of beetle of the family Chrysomelidae. It is found in Guatemala and Mexico (Guerrero, Veracruz).

== Description ==
The vertex and front are opaque, impressed with a longitudinal groove and the interocular space is moderately produced. The antennae are longer than the head and thorax. The thorax is subconic, slightly broader than long and the sides converging from the base to the apex, obsoletely angulate, slightly stained with piceous. The elytra are oblong, with the sides sinuate, very slightly dilated towards the apex, the apex itself obtuse, the outer margin obsoletely serrulate. Each elytron has eight, at the extreme base with nine, regular rows of punctures, the second, fourth, and sixth interspaces costate. The outer costa is less distinct on the hinder disc, abruptly elevated at its apex, and confluent with the apex of the middle one. The humeral callus is laterally produced, its apex obtuse.

== Biology ==
The recorded food plant is Eupatorium populifolium.
