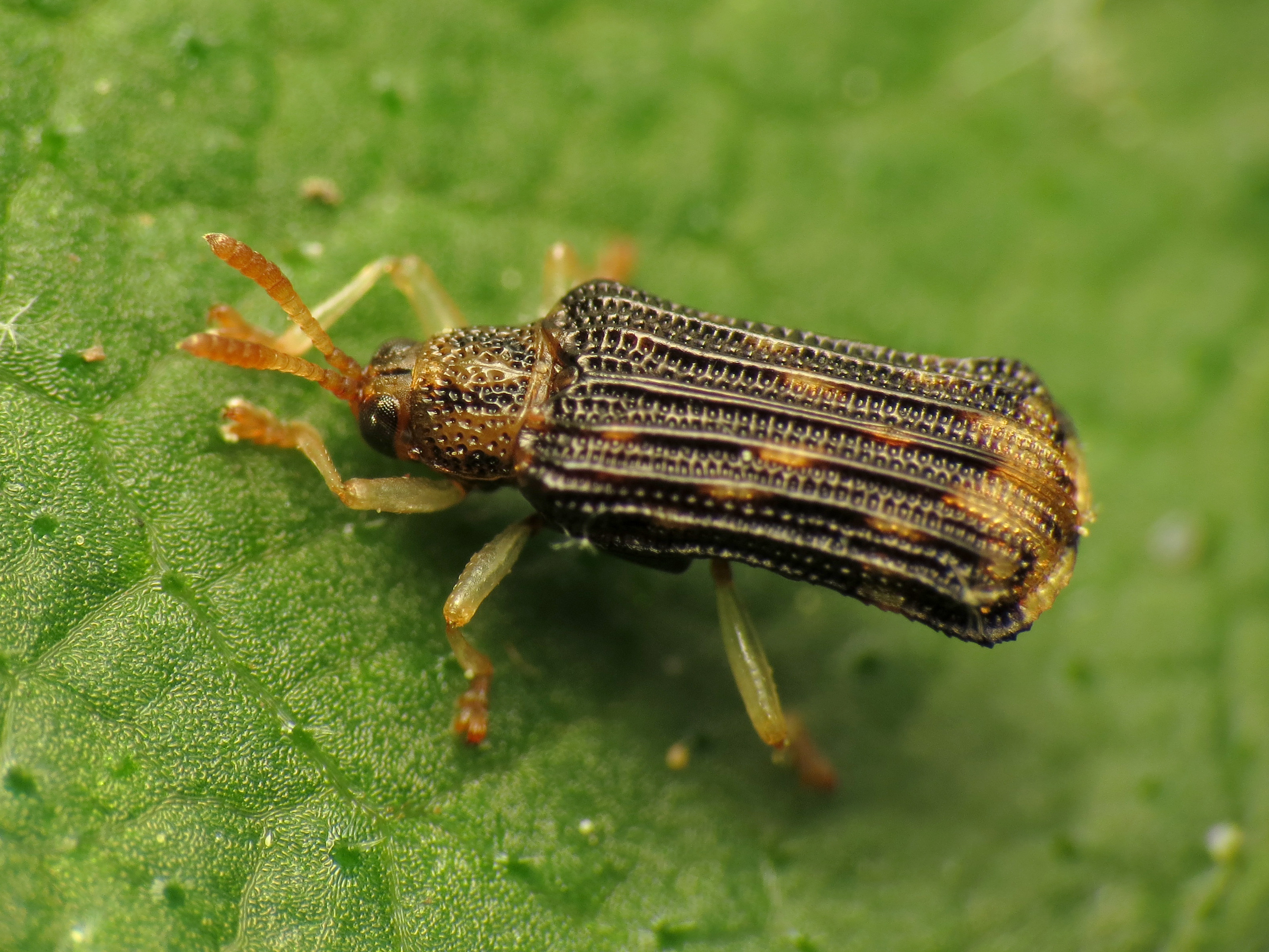
- A leafminer beetle at Rock Creek Park.
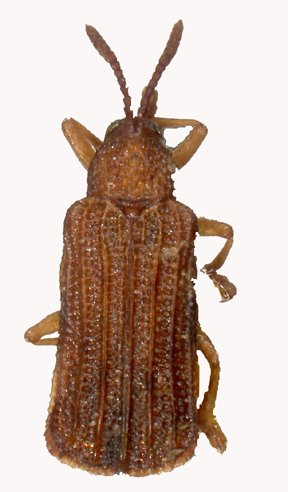
- A mounted specimen

Scientific classification
- Kingdom: Animalia
- Phylum: Arthropoda
- Clade: Pancrustacea
- Class: Insecta
- Order: Coleoptera
- Suborder: Polyphaga
- Infraorder: Cucujiformia
- Family: Chrysomelidae
- Genus: Sumitrosis
- Species: S. rosea

Binomial name
- Sumitrosis rosea (Weber, 1801)

Synonyms
- Anoplitis rosea; Hispa rosea Weber, 1801; Hispa philemon Newman, 1838

= Sumitrosis rosea =

Species of beetle

Sumitrosis rosea, a leaf-mining beetle, is a species of leaf beetle in the family Chrysomelidae. It is found in North America, where it has been recorded from Canada (Manitoba, New Brunswick, Nova Scotia, Ontario, Prince Edward Island, Quebec, Saskatchewan) and the United States (Alabama, Arizona, Arkansas, Connecticut, Delaware, District of Columbia, Florida, Georgia, Illinois, Indiana, Iowa, Kansas, Kentucky, Louisiana, Maine, Maryland, Michigan, Minnesota, Mississippi, Missouri, New Jersey, New York, North Carolina, Ohio, Oklahoma, Pennsylvania, South Carolina, Tennessee, Texas, Vermont, Virginia, West Virginia, Wisconsin, Wyoming).

== Description ==
Adults reach a length of about 3.3-4.5 mm. Adults are highly variable in colour, with the elytra ranging from pale yellow with faint black markings, to black with faint yellow spots.

== Biology ==
They feed on various Fabaceae species, but especially Robinia pseudoacacia and Desmodium species, but also on plants from other families, such as Celastrus orbiculatus and Centrosema pubescens. Adults have been collected from plants in various families.
