= Sumitrosis annulipes =

Scientific classification
- Kingdom: Animalia
- Phylum: Arthropoda
- Clade: Pancrustacea
- Class: Insecta
- Order: Coleoptera
- Suborder: Polyphaga
- Infraorder: Cucujiformia
- Family: Chrysomelidae
- Genus: Sumitrosis
- Species: S. annulipes

Binomial name
- Sumitrosis annulipes (Pic, 1932)

Synonyms
- Anoplitis annulipes Pic, 1932

Species of beetle

Sumitrosis annulipes is a species of beetle of the family Chrysomelidae. It is found in Brazil.

== Biology ==
The food plant is unknown.
