= Sumitrosis imparallela =

Scientific classification
- Kingdom: Animalia
- Phylum: Arthropoda
- Clade: Pancrustacea
- Class: Insecta
- Order: Coleoptera
- Suborder: Polyphaga
- Infraorder: Cucujiformia
- Family: Chrysomelidae
- Genus: Sumitrosis
- Species: S. imparallela

Binomial name
- Sumitrosis imparallela (Pic, 1932)

Synonyms
- Anoplitis imparallela Pic, 1932

Species of beetle

Sumitrosis imparallela is a species of beetle of the family Chrysomelidae. It is found in Costa Rica.

== Biology ==
The food plants is unknown.
