= Sumitrosis flavipennis =

Scientific classification
- Kingdom: Animalia
- Phylum: Arthropoda
- Clade: Pancrustacea
- Class: Insecta
- Order: Coleoptera
- Suborder: Polyphaga
- Infraorder: Cucujiformia
- Family: Chrysomelidae
- Genus: Sumitrosis
- Species: S. flavipennis

Binomial name
- Sumitrosis flavipennis (Weise, 1910)

Synonyms
- Anoplitis difficilis Weise, 1910

Species of beetle

Sumitrosis flavipennis is a species of beetle of the family Chrysomelidae. It is found in Bolivia.

== Biology ==
The food plant is unknown.
