= Sumitrosis difficilis =

Scientific classification
- Kingdom: Animalia
- Phylum: Arthropoda
- Clade: Pancrustacea
- Class: Insecta
- Order: Coleoptera
- Suborder: Polyphaga
- Infraorder: Cucujiformia
- Family: Chrysomelidae
- Genus: Sumitrosis
- Species: S. difficilis

Binomial name
- Sumitrosis difficilis (Monrós and Viana, 1947)

Synonyms
- Anoplitis difficilis Monrós and Viana, 1947; Anoplitis difficilis castanea Uhmann, 1961

Species of beetle

Sumitrosis difficilis is a species of beetle of the family Chrysomelidae. It is found in Argentina and Brazil (Goiás, São Paulo).

== Biology ==
The recorded food plant is Canavalia ensiformis.
