= Sumitrosis maculata =

Scientific classification
- Kingdom: Animalia
- Phylum: Arthropoda
- Clade: Pancrustacea
- Class: Insecta
- Order: Coleoptera
- Suborder: Polyphaga
- Infraorder: Cucujiformia
- Family: Chrysomelidae
- Genus: Sumitrosis
- Species: S. maculata

Binomial name
- Sumitrosis maculata (Uhmann, 1931)

Synonyms
- Anoplitis maculata Uhmann, 1931

Species of beetle

Sumitrosis maculata is a species of beetle of the family Chrysomelidae. It is found in Brazil (São Paulo).

== Biology ==
The food plants is unknown.
