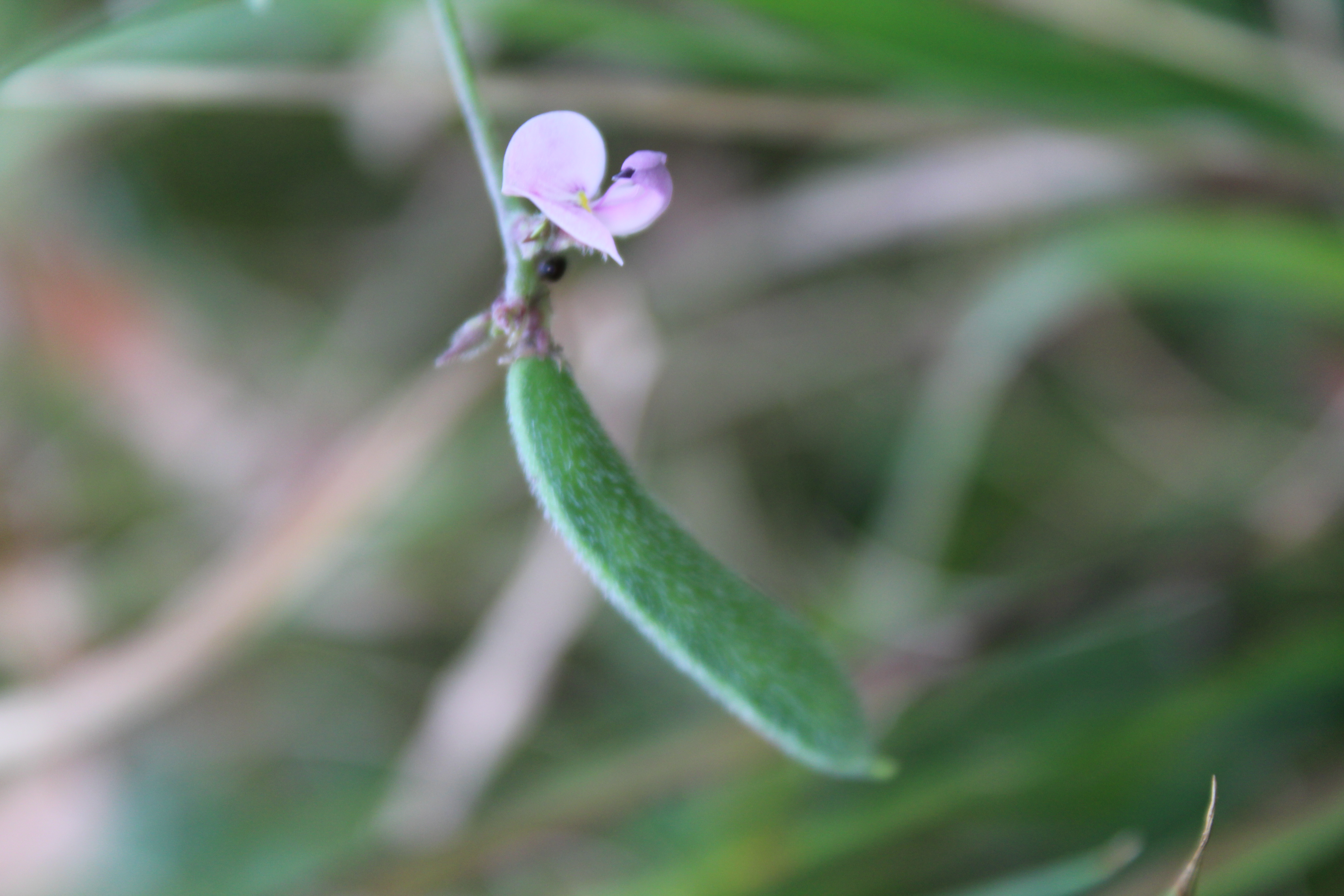
- Typical flower & pod, Gray Summit, Missouri

Conservation status
- Secure (NatureServe)

Scientific classification
- Kingdom: Plantae
- Clade: Tracheophytes
- Clade: Angiosperms
- Clade: Eudicots
- Clade: Rosids
- Order: Fabales
- Family: Fabaceae
- Subfamily: Faboideae
- Genus: Strophostyles
- Species: S. leiosperma

Binomial name
- Strophostyles leiosperma (Torr. & A.Gray) Piper

Synonyms
- List: Phaseolus leiospermus Torr. & A.Gray (1838); Phaseolus pauciflorus Benth. (1837); Strophostyles pauciflora S.Watson (1890); Strophostyles pauciflora var. canescens R.W.S.Cocks (1910)

= Strophostyles leiosperma =

Plant species in the pea family

Strophostyles leiosperma, known as slickseed fuzzybean, or smoothseed / small-flower wildbean is a species of herbaceous, vining legume native to the central to western U.S. It occurs west to Colorado and New Mexico, east to Louisiana, south to Mexico, and north to Minnesota. It is most easily distinguished from the other two Strophostyles species by the abundance of small silky hairs on its leaves and pods, and small pea-shaped flowers with a much reduced keel that is largely hidden by the wing petals.

This species is an annual to short-lived perennial. All parts tend to be smaller for S. leiosperma in general than its congeners, and it is a more diminutive plant overall. The leaflets are typically thin and rarely lobed (never deeply lobed). Unlike its congeners, its seeds rarely have a waxy, hairy covering, and it tends to occur in drier sites. Likewise, the specific epithet leiosperma means "smooth seed." It is also the most likely of these species to be capable of self-fertilization.

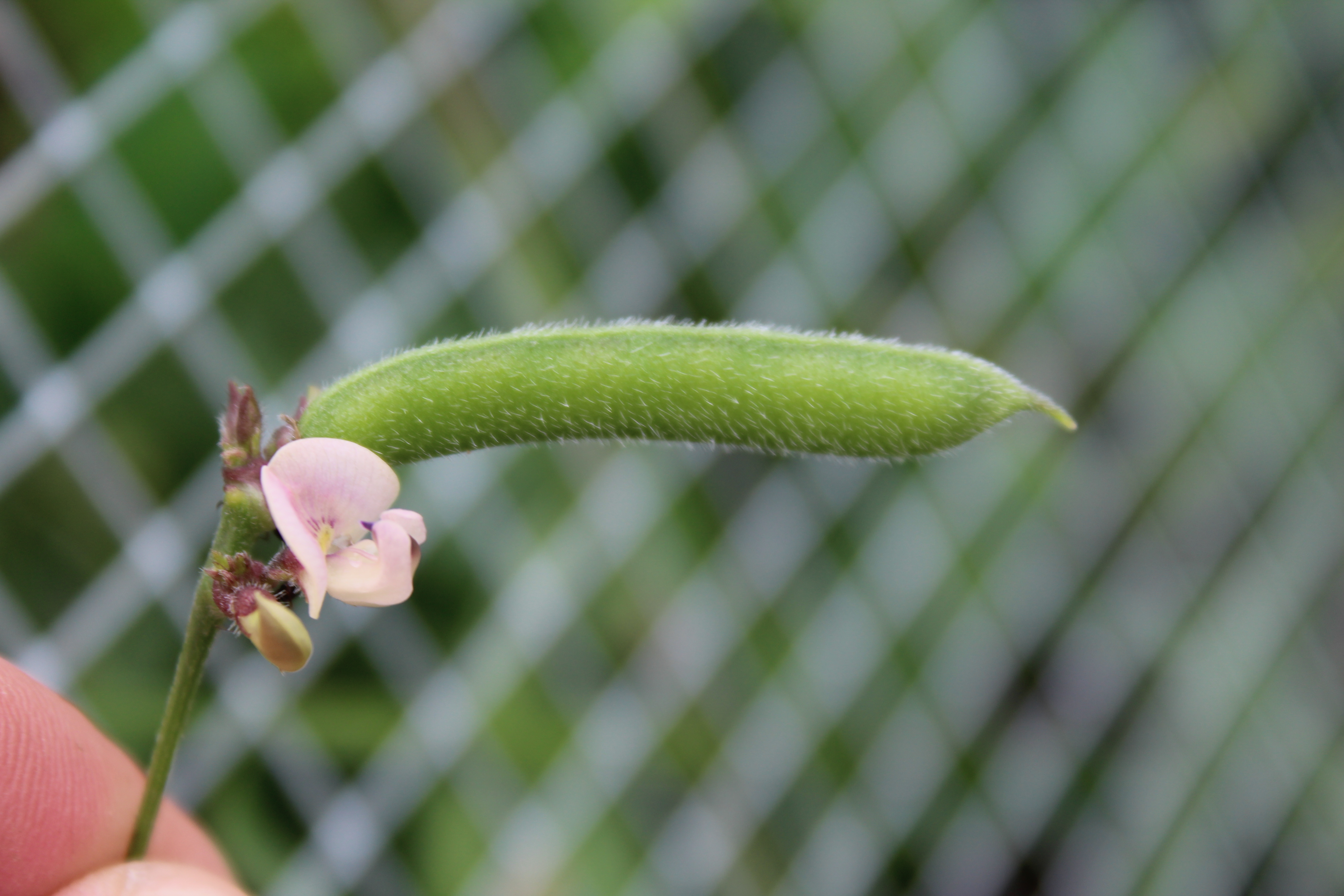
S. leiosperma flower & unripe pod
