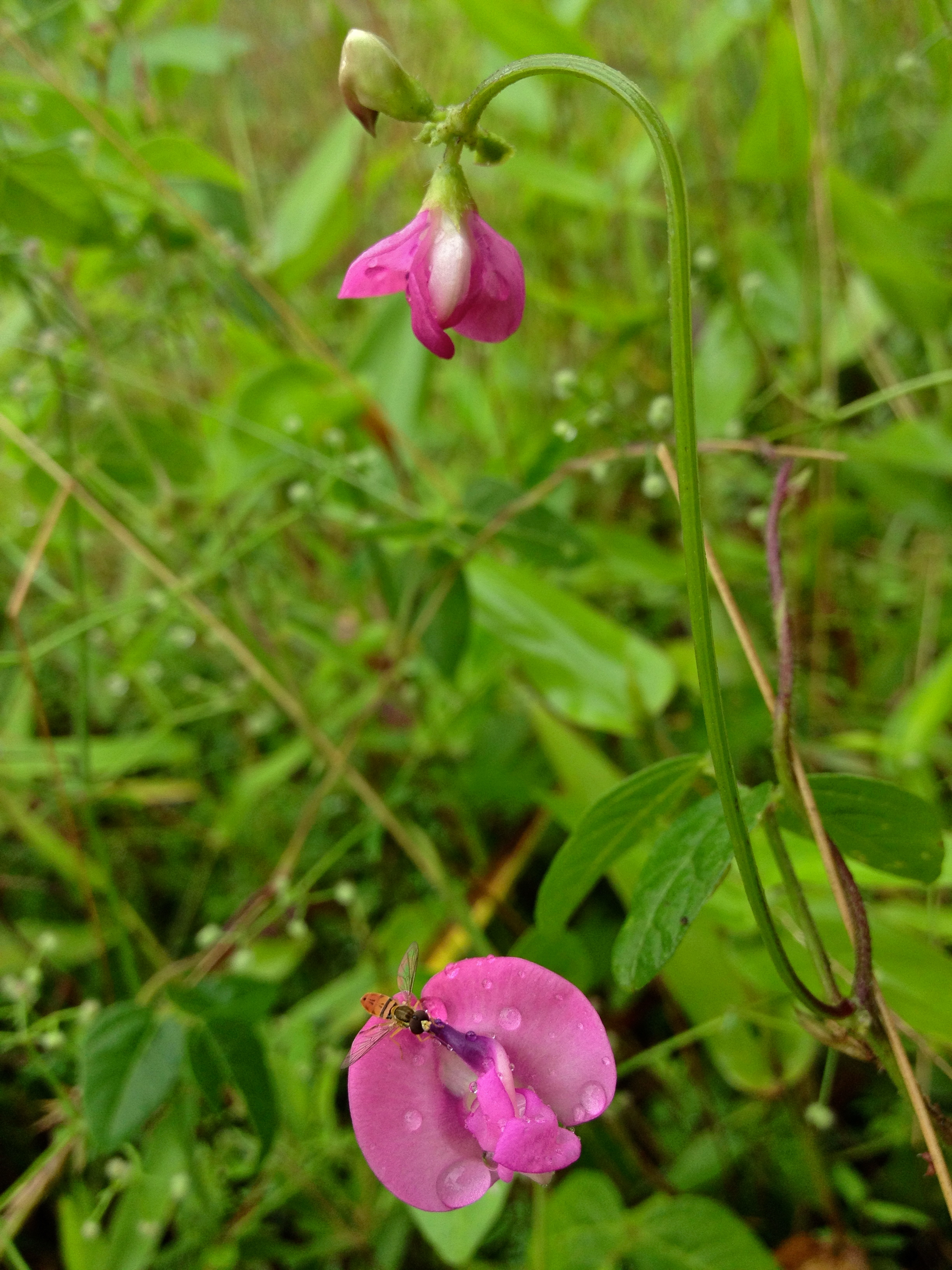

Scientific classification
- Kingdom: Plantae
- Clade: Tracheophytes
- Clade: Angiosperms
- Clade: Eudicots
- Clade: Rosids
- Order: Fabales
- Family: Fabaceae
- Subfamily: Faboideae
- Genus: Strophostyles
- Species: S. umbellata

Binomial name
- Strophostyles umbellata (Muhl. ex Willd.) Britton, 1897

Synonyms
- Phaseolus umbellatus Britton; Strophostyles umbellata var. paludigena Fernald; Strophostyles umbellata var. umbellata

= Strophostyles umbellata =

Species of plant

Strophostyles umbellata, commonly known as the pink fuzzybean or perennial wild bean, is a species of perennial flowering plant in the family Fabaceae. It is native to fields and woods in the southeastern and central United States. It blooms from June to September.

This species is best distinguished from its congeners by its thick, relatively straight keel petal, held close to the banner petal. It also uniquely possesses a perennial, branched caudex at its base. It is most similar morphologically to S. helvola, the differences being that S. helvola has a much thinner keel, curving away more from the banner petal throughout its length. Its leaf morphology can be highly variable, ranging from the highly lobed panduriform shape typical of Strophostyles helvola, to the thin, sericeous, lanceolate leaf typical of S. leiosperma.

Strophostyles umbellata individuals tend to be scattered from one another, which, possibly combined with self-incompatibility, can contribute to their observed low pod set. Like S. helvola, its seeds also possess a cellular, waxy coating, which may aid in buoyancy and water dispersal.
