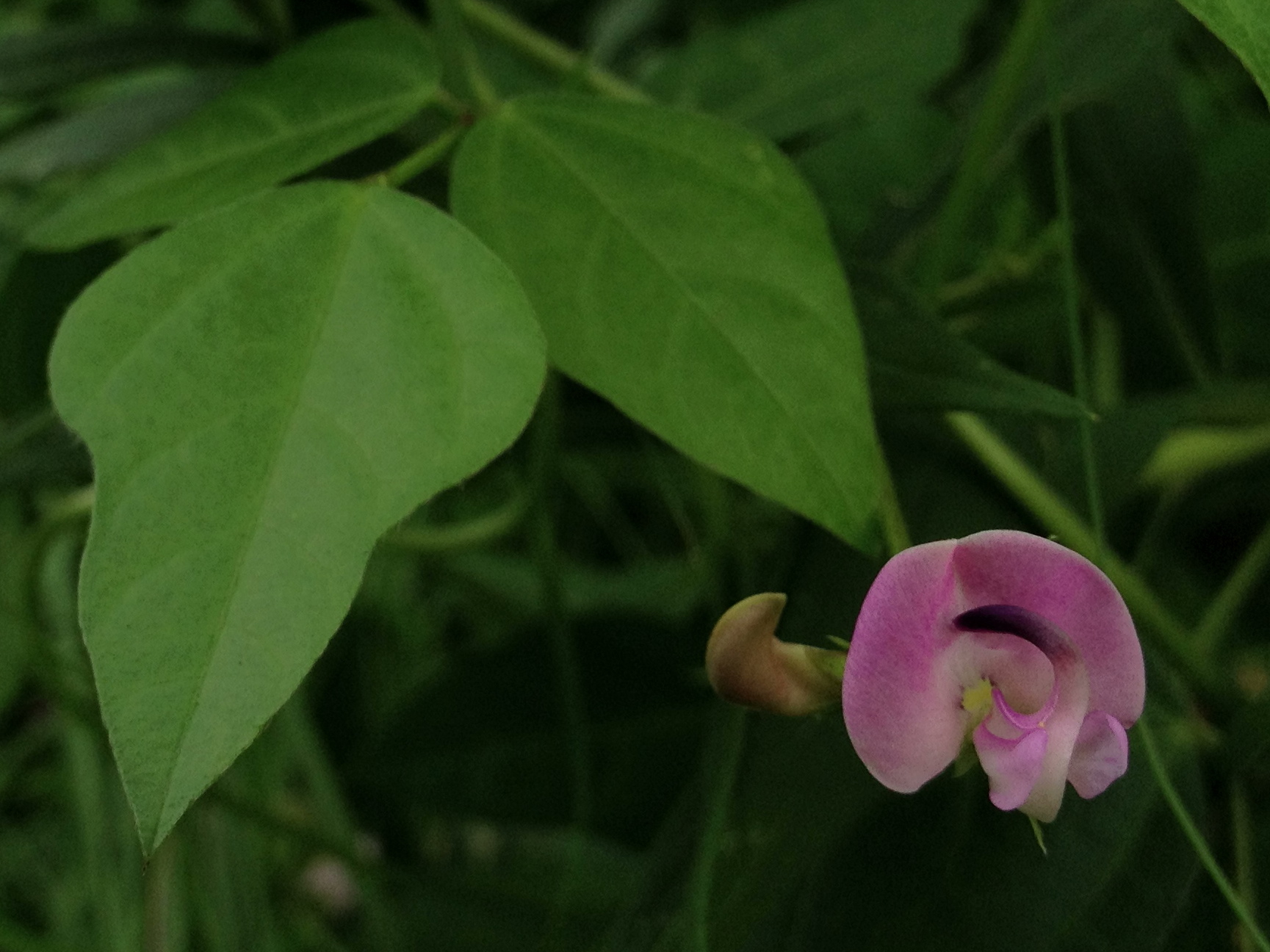

Conservation status
- Secure (NatureServe)

Scientific classification
- Kingdom: Plantae
- Clade: Embryophytes
- Clade: Tracheophytes
- Clade: Angiosperms
- Clade: Eudicots
- Clade: Rosids
- Order: Fabales
- Family: Fabaceae
- Subfamily: Faboideae
- Genus: Strophostyles
- Species: S. helvola

Binomial name
- Strophostyles helvola (L.) Elliott

Synonyms
- Cajanus helvulus (L.) Spreng., 1826; Dolichos helvolus (L.) Nutt., 1818; Glycine angulosa Muhl. ex Willd., 1802; Glycine helvola (L.) Elliott, 1818; Glycine peduncularis Muhl., 1813; Glycine peduncularis var. parabolicus Muhl. ex Barton, 1815; Phaseolus angulosus Ortega, 1860; Phaseolus diversifolius Persoon, 1807; Phaseolus farinosus L., 1753; Phaseolus helvolus L., 1753; Phaseolus peduncularis (Muhl. ex Barton) W. Barton, 1818; Phaseolus peregrinus Nissole, 1732; Phaseolus trilobus Michaux ex Rich., 1803; Phaseolus vexillatus Walter, 1788; Strophostyles angulosa (Muhl. ex Willd.) Elliott, 1823; Strophostyles angulosa (Muhl. ex Willd.) A. Gray var. missouriensis S. Watson, 1890; Strophostyles helvola var. missouriensis (S. Watson) Britton, 1897; Strophostyles missouriensis (S. Watson) Small, 1903; Strophostyles peduncularis (Muhl. ex Elliott) Elliott, 1823

= Strophostyles helvola =

Species of legume

Strophostyles helvola, commonly called amberique-bean, annual sand bean, or trailing fuzzybean is a species of flowering plant in the legume family. It is native to eastern Canada and the eastern United States.

== Description ==
It is an annual to perennial herbaceous vine, up to 3 m (9.8 ft) long, with light pubescence on the stem, leaves, and pods. The trifoliate leaves are often divided into three lobes, in a fiddle-shape (panduriform). They possess unique pea-like pink-purple flowers (fading to cream-yellow), with a gradually curving keel petal (the keel petal is one of the most distinguishing characters among the species of the genus). The fruit of S. helvola is up to 10 cm (3.9 in) long, containing shiny black seeds with hairy coats originating from the inner surface of the pods. This seed coating lends the seeds buoyancy in water, which is thought to have contributed to its dispersal along major aquatic routes.

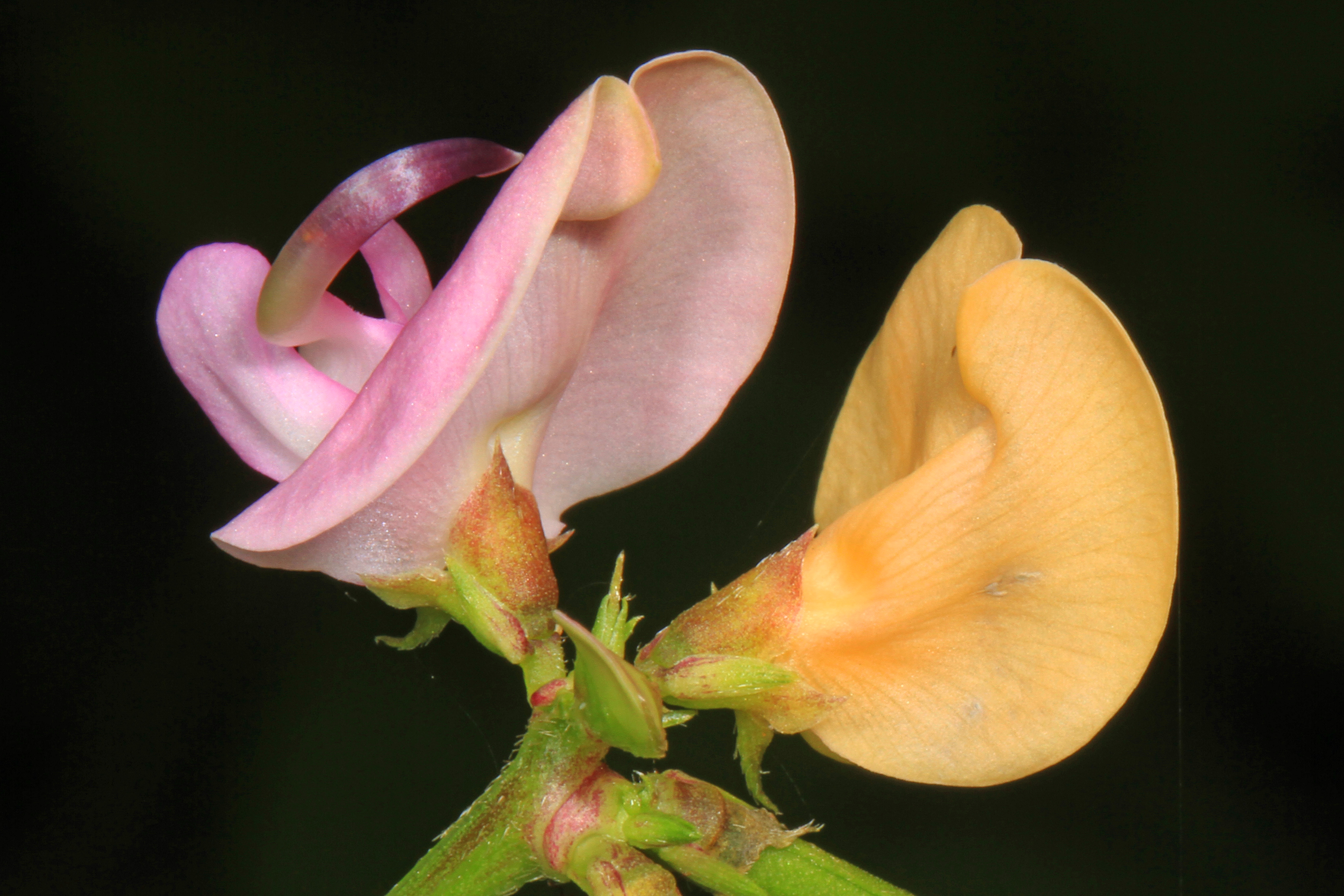
Detail of flowers

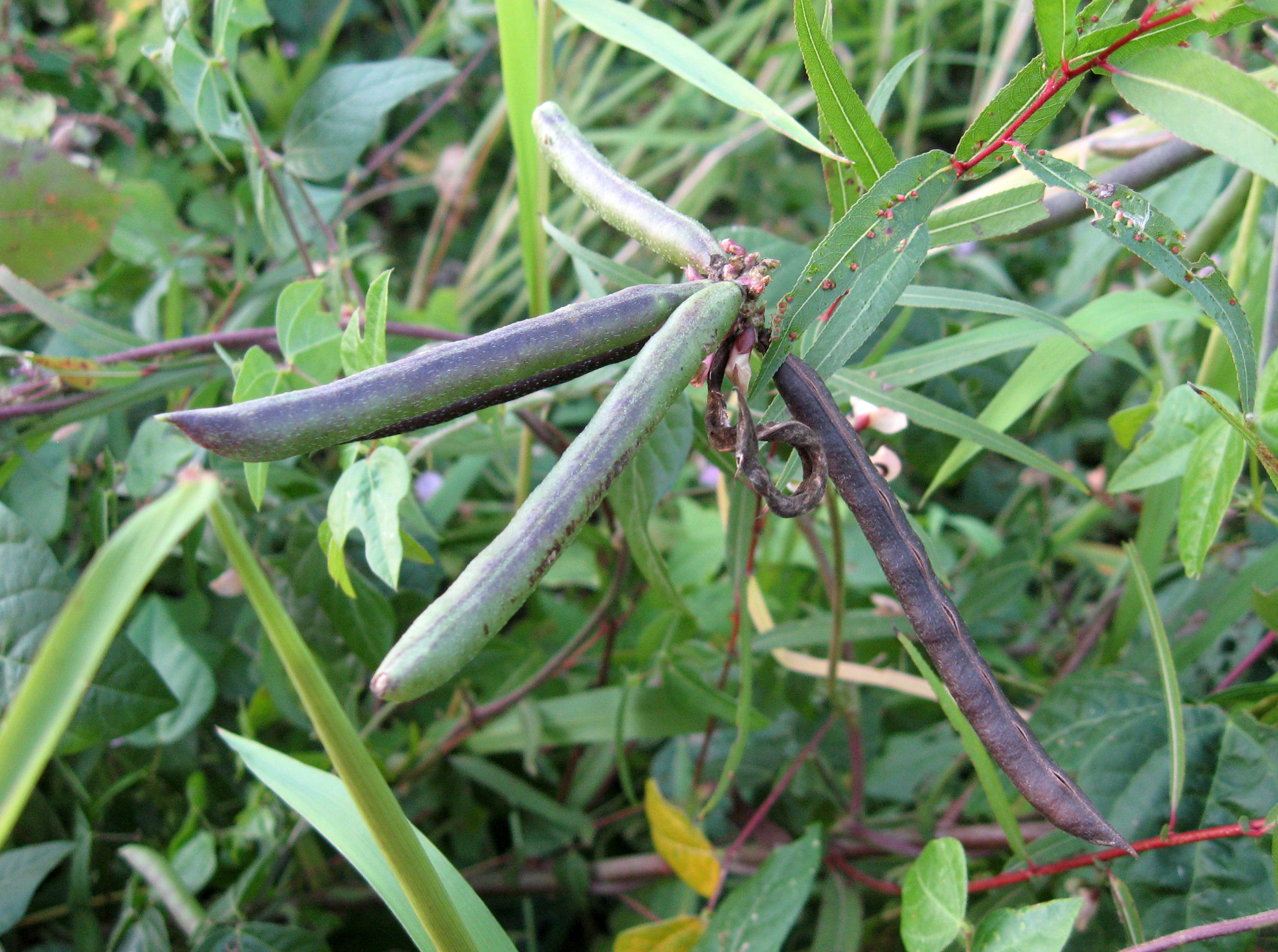
Detail of fruit

Strophostyles helvola is primarily diagnosed by its keel petal (prominent, thin, curving away from the banner at the distal end); long, cylindrical pods; and highly lobed leaves (though not always lobed, and Strophostyles umbellata may also show lobing).

When the seed pods are mature, they burst open to release the seeds.

== Taxonomy ==
In addition to the type, at least one infraspecific taxon has been recognized, S. helvola var. missouriensis (S. Watson) Britton, although there is little evidence for distinct varieties of this species.

A widely used orthographic variant is Strophostyles helvula, although only the former is taxonomically accepted.

== Agricultural relevance ==
Strophostyles helvola is a wild relative of the cultivated common bean (Phaseolus vulgaris), and could serve as an important model for understanding how herbaceous legumes adapt to different stressful environments. Specifically, S. helvola has coastal populations which show high salinity tolerance due to up-regulated genes.

== Distribution and habitat ==
It is native to eastern Canada and the eastern United States. This bean grows in many habitat types, including disturbed areas, where it is a pioneer species, taking hold in areas where few other plants grow, and in several types of soil, especially sandy types, and it can grow in dry or moist conditions. It can often be found in seaside dune habitat, where arbuscular mycorrhizae help it withstand saline conditions.

== Ethnobotany ==
This plant was used medicinally and as food by Native American peoples. The Houma people used it to treat typhoid and the Iroquois used it topically for poison ivy irritation and warts. The Choctaw people used the boiled, mashed roots for food. Discovery of large quantities of S. helvola seeds in archaeological sites also suggests a use similar to common bean at one time; though the seeds are smaller than cultivated bean, it is nutritionally similar and possesses the largest seeds and pods for the genus. The pods have been used in the present day as a sauteed vegetable in South Central Mindanao, Philippines.
