= V. gracilis =

V. gracilis may refer to:

- Vigna gracilis, a synonym for Vigna parkeri, a plant species in the genus Vigna
- Vucetichia gracilis, a synonym of Ferugliotherium windhauseni, a Cretaceous gondwanathere mammal

== See also ==
- Gracilis (disambiguation)
