= Caloptilia soyella =

Scientific classification
- Domain: Eukaryota
- Kingdom: Animalia
- Phylum: Arthropoda
- Class: Insecta
- Order: Lepidoptera
- Family: Gracillariidae
- Genus: Caloptilia
- Species: C. soyella

Binomial name
- Caloptilia soyella (van Deventer, 1904)

Synonyms
- Gracilaria soyella Deventer, 1904

Species of moth

Caloptilia soyella is a moth of the family Gracillariidae. It is known from Cape Verde, China, Fiji, India, Indonesia (Java), Japan (Kyūshū, Honshū, Shikoku), Sri Lanka and Vietnam.

The wingspan is 9–10.2 mm.

The larvae feed on Cajanus cajan, Dolichos species, Glycine max, Kummerovia striana, Lespedeza cyrtobotrya, Phaseolus calcaratus, Phaseolus mungo, Pueraria candollei, Soya hispida, Vigna angularis, Vigna mungo and Vigna umbellata. They mine the leaves of their host plant.
