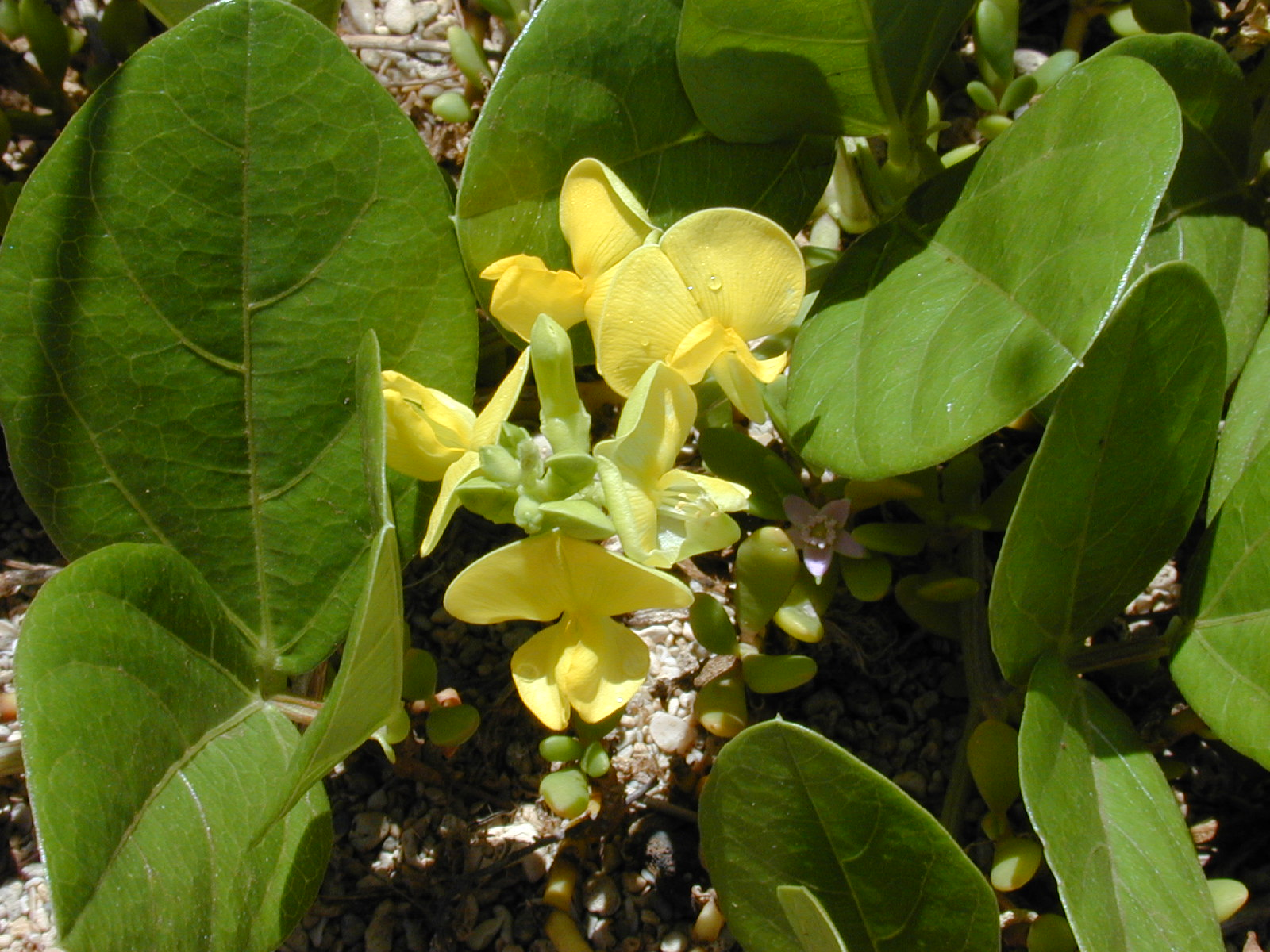

Scientific classification
- Kingdom: Plantae
- Clade: Tracheophytes
- Clade: Angiosperms
- Clade: Eudicots
- Clade: Rosids
- Order: Fabales
- Family: Fabaceae
- Subfamily: Faboideae
- Genus: Vigna
- Species: V. marina

Binomial name
- Vigna marina (Burm.f.) Merr.

Synonyms
- See text

= Vigna marina =

Species of legume

Vigna marina is a prostrate, creeping vine and a perennial plant. Also known as the beach pea, nanea, and notched cowpea, it is a species of legume in the family Fabaceae.

== Naming ==
=== Etymology ===
The genus "Vigna" is named for Dominico Vigna, an Italian doctor and horticulturalist who was a professor of botany at the University of Pisa; he died in 1647. The specific epithet "marina", from the Latin word for "sea", refers to the plant's coastal habitat.

=== Synonyms ===
Synonyms of this species include:

- Dolichos luteus Sw.
- Phaseolus marinus
- Scytalis anomala
- Scytalis retusa E. Mey.
- Vigna anomala Walp.
- Vigna lutea (Sw.) A. Gray
- Vigna repens var. lutea (Sw.) Kuntze
- Vigna retusa (E. Mey.) Walp.

=== Hawaiian names ===
In Hawaii, this plant is known by various names, including:

- Lemuomakili
- Mohihihi
- Nanea
- Nenea
- Pūhili
- Pūhilihili
- Pūlihilihi
- Wahine ʻōmaʻo
- ʻŌkolemakili

== Description ==
=== Stem ===
The stems grow up to 3 metres long, and often have purplish stripes.

=== Leaves ===
The leaves are trifoliate and are light green in colour. They grow from the stems, each on a stalk of about 2 to 5 cm long, and are arranged alternately. Small, triangular leaf-like stipules are located at the junction where the leaf stalk meets the stem.

Three triple-nerved leaflets comprise each leaf. These are smooth-edged, and broadly oval to oblong in shape, with a pointed tip. They grow from 4 to 10 cm in length, and 2 to 5 cm in width.

=== Flowers ===
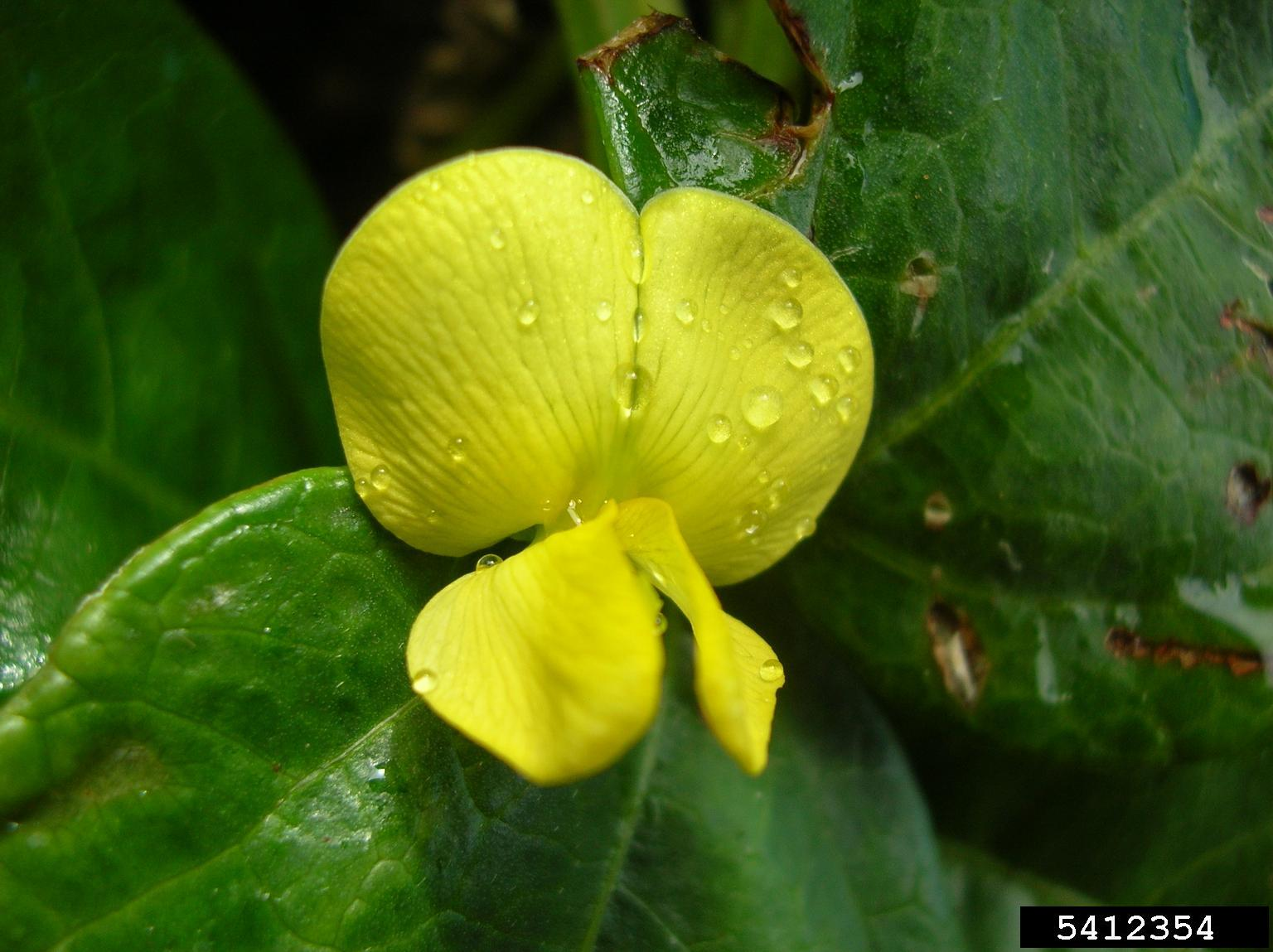
Flower

The flowers are yellow in colour, and are pea-type in shape. They grow from stalks which have a maximum length of approximately 10 cm. The flowers are between 15 and 18 mm long, and grow in clusters around the tip of the stalk. These flowers occur year round, but mostly in the autumn and early winter. The flowers have no fragrance.

=== Fruit ===
The peas are circular to oblong in shape, and have a greyish-brown colour. They grow within rounded pods in groups of 4 to 9. The pods are up to 8 cm in length and 6 mm wide. The ripened peas are released when the pod opens and then twists.

== Distribution ==
This species is salt-tolerant and is found on tropical beaches around the world, such as those in Hawaii and on various islands in the Pacific Ocean, Puerto Rico and other Caribbean islands, the coast of Bahia, Brazil, the Atlantic and Indian coasts of Africa, Madagascar, the Seychelles, India and Sri Lanka, Indo-China and the Chinese island of Hainan, Malesia, and along the Australian coast in Queensland and the Northern Territory.

== Habitat ==
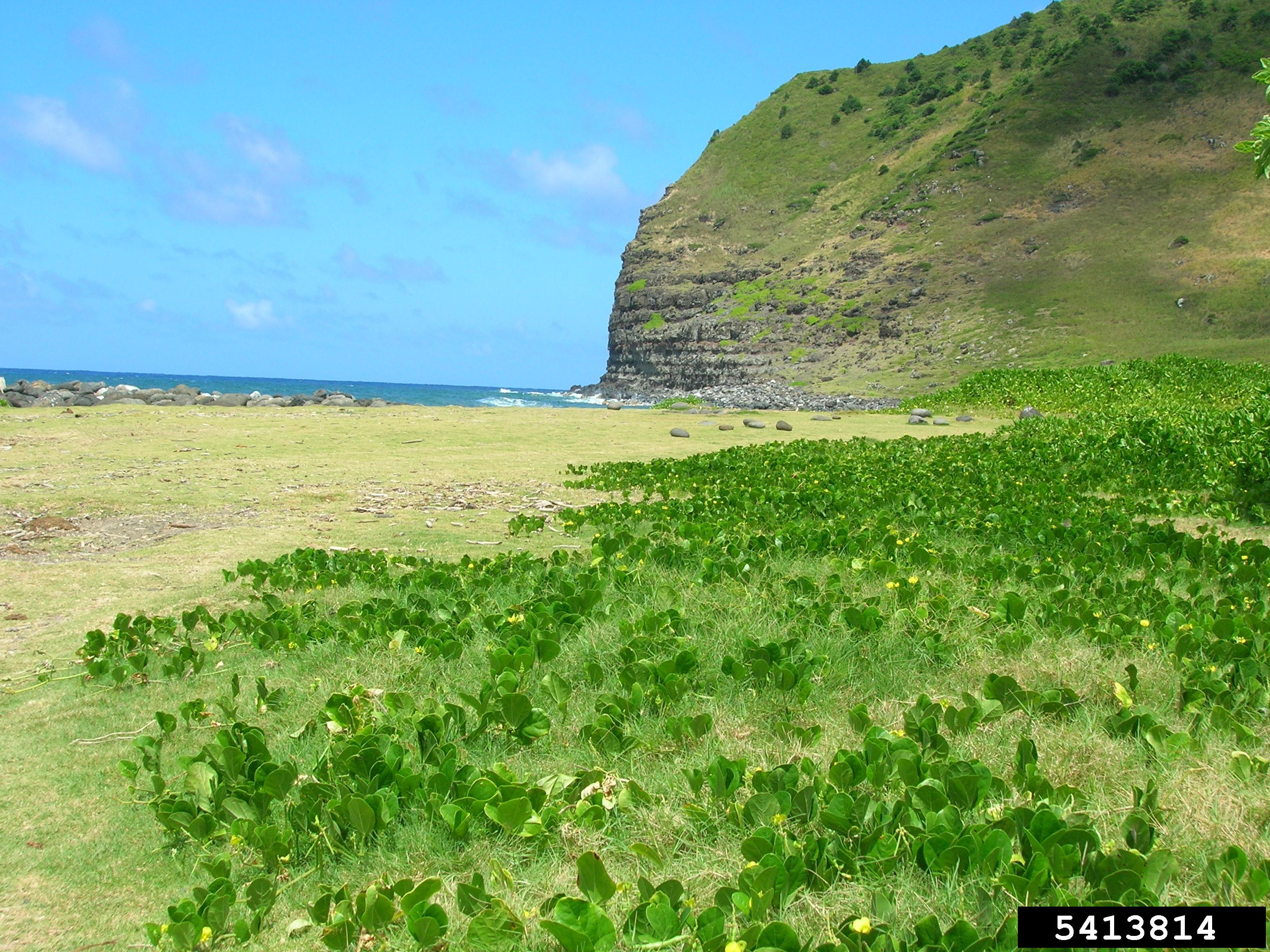
Habitat

Vigna marina grows at the vegetation line on sandy beaches, frontal dunes, and beach ridges near the seashore. Rarely, it occurs on inland sea cliffs and dry slopes among shrubs up to approximately 395 feet above the sea.

== Uses and benefits ==
As a treatment to help heal wounds such as boils, running sore, or ulcers (known locally as hēhē), early Hawaiians ground the leaves, stalks, midribs (kua), and stems of the plant, and applied the softened materials directly onto the affected area.

As is the case in many pea species, Vigna marina is able to fix nitrogen from the air around it roots. This is done by microorganisms on the nodules of the roots. The resultant nitrogen is used by the plant, and also increases the nitrogen content in the surrounding sand. This helps other plants in the vicinity to grow.

Vigna marina can prevent coastal erosion.

== Propagation ==
This species will grow from seed. Light scarification can bring the seed out of dormancy and help it germinate. Nodulation can take place without inoculation with any specific rhizobium.

== Related species ==
Vigna marina is one of three species of Vigna native to the Hawaiian Islands. One of the others, Vigna adenantha, also known as "wild pea", was formerly found on Oʻahu and Hawaiʻi Island but was last reported in the 1850s. Vigna o-wahuensis is a rare species endemic to the Hawaiian Islands and is considered endangered.

Vigna marina is a close relative of other Vigna species that are grown as crops worldwide. These include:

- Vigna angularis - azuki bean
- Vigna mungo - urad bean or black gram
- Vigna umbellata - rice bean
- Vigna radiata - mung bean
- Vigna unguiculata subsp. sesquipedalis - yardlong bean or Chinese long bean
- Vigna unguiculata spp. dekindtiana - black-eyed pea
