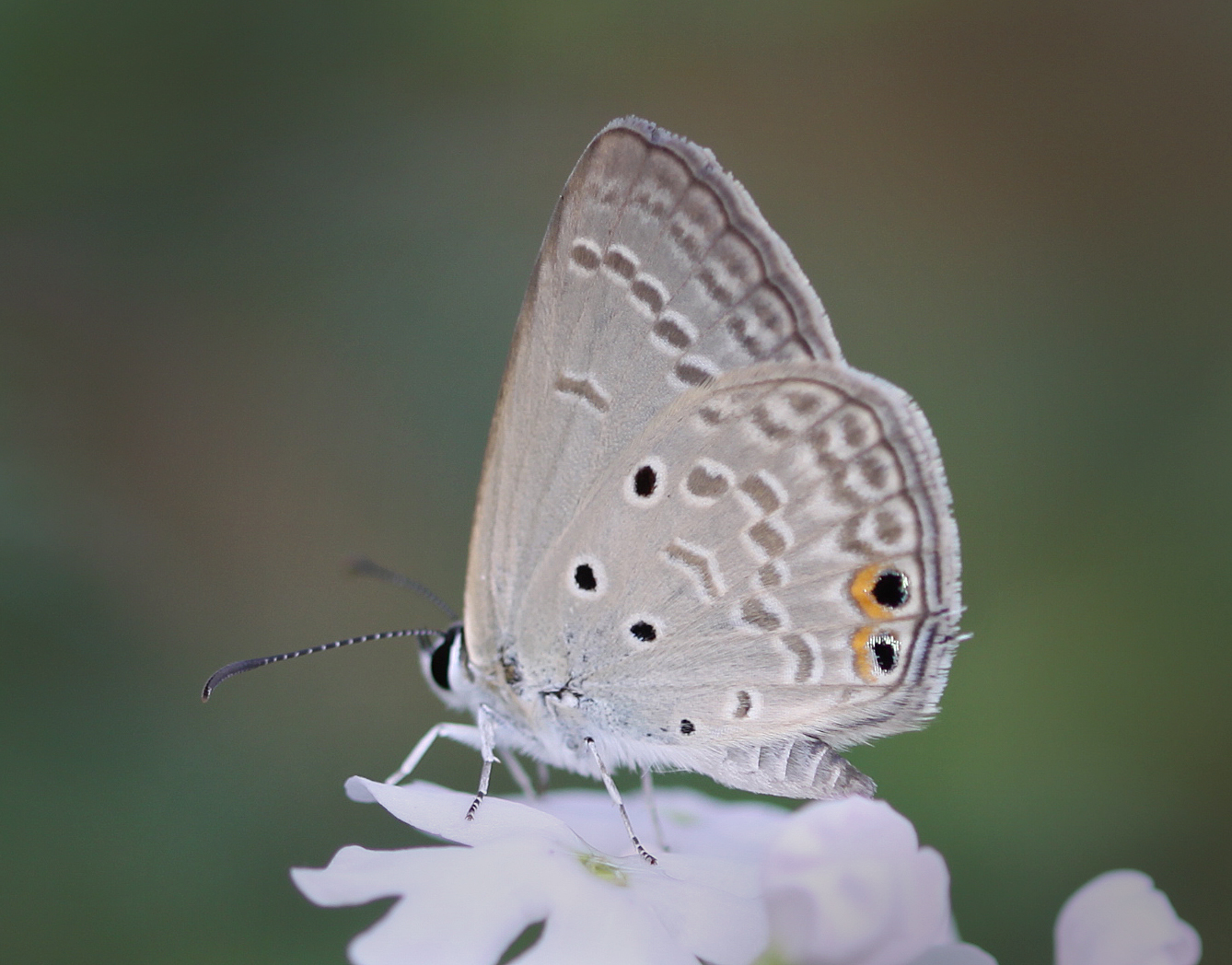
- Male
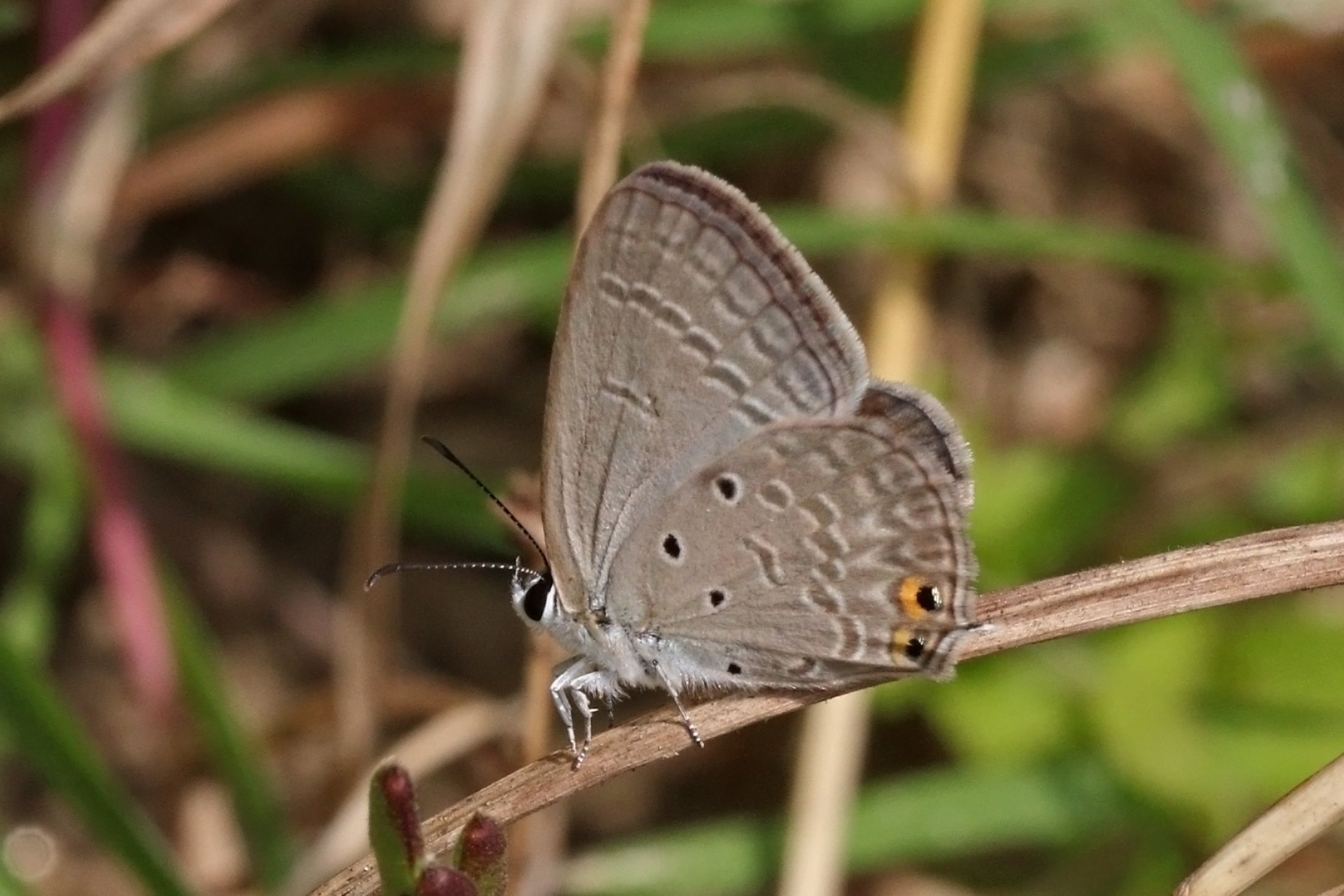
- Female

Scientific classification
- Domain: Eukaryota
- Kingdom: Animalia
- Phylum: Arthropoda
- Class: Insecta
- Order: Lepidoptera
- Family: Lycaenidae
- Genus: Euchrysops
- Species: E. cnejus

Binomial name
- Euchrysops cnejus (Fabricius 1798)

Synonyms
- Hesperia cnejus Fabricius, 1798; Lycaena pandia Kollar, [1844]; Lycaena patala Kollar, [1844]; Lycaena monica Reakirt, 1866; Lycaena samoa Herrich-Schäffer, 1869; Cupido amazara Kirby, 1871; Catochrysops hapalina Butler, 1883; Catochrysops trifracta Butler, 1884; Catochrysops theseus Swinhoe, 1885; Euchrysops suffusus Rothschild, 1915; Euchrysops cnidus Waterhouse & Lyell, 1914; Catochrysops vitiensis Butler, 1883; Plebejus luzonicus Röber, 1886

= Euchrysops cnejus =

Gram blue

Species of butterfly

Euchrysops cnejus, the gram blue, is a small butterfly that belongs to the lycaenids or blues family. It is found from India to Australia. The species was first described by Johan Christian Fabricius in 1798.

== Description ==
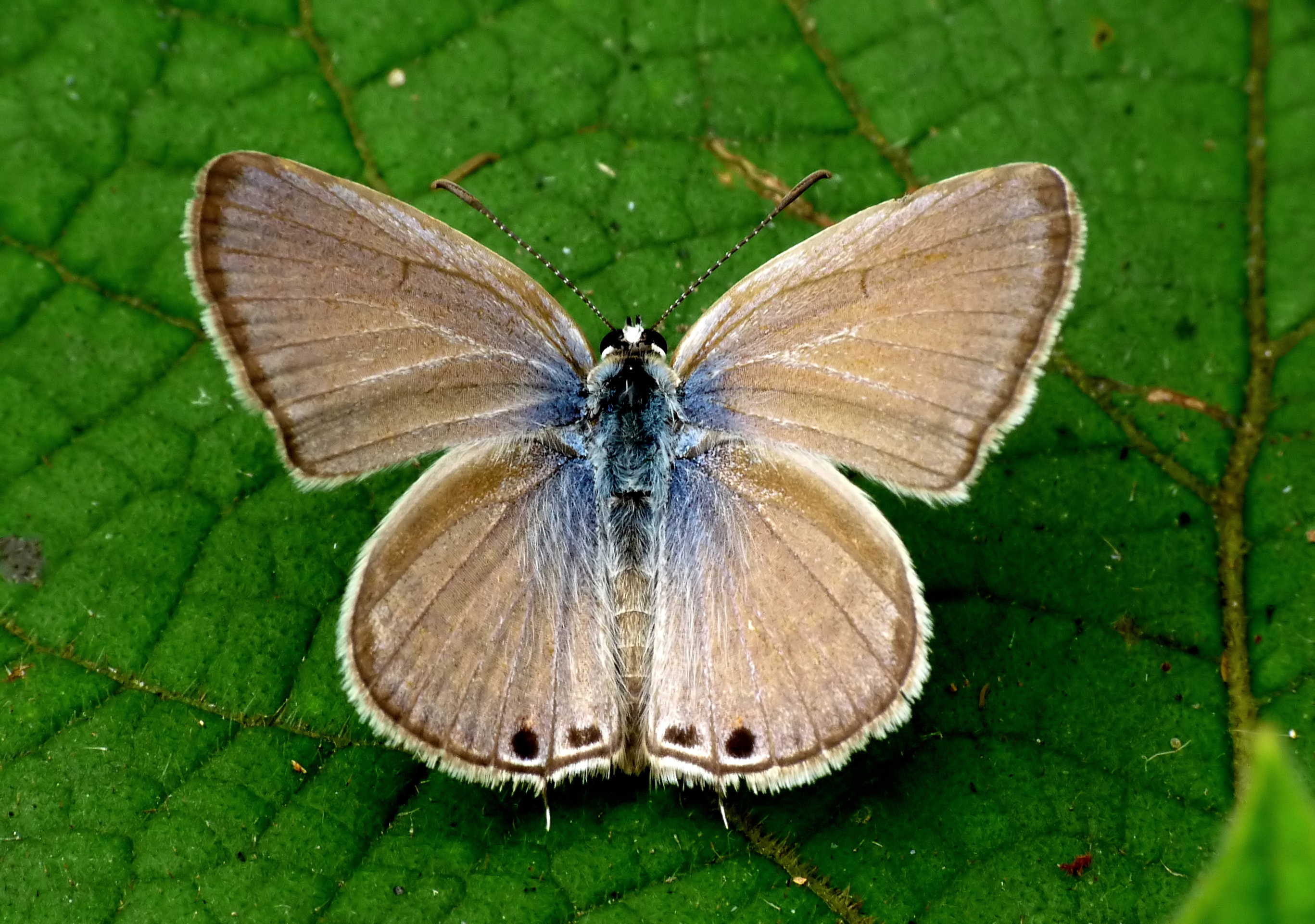
Upperside (male)

Male upperside: pale purplish suffused with a bluish shade, apparent only in certain lights. Forewing: a slender black anteciliary line edged on the inner side narrowly with fuscous dark brown, broader at apex than at the tornal angle. Hindwing: a subterminal black spot in interspace 1 and another similar spot in interspace 2, the two spots subequal in size, edged on the outer side by a white thread and on the inner side with ochraceous, more prominent in the spot in interspace 2; a slender anteciliary black line with an inner narrow margin of diffuse fuscous brown. Cilia of both forewings and hindwings pale; tail at apex of vein 2 of the hindwing black tipped with white.

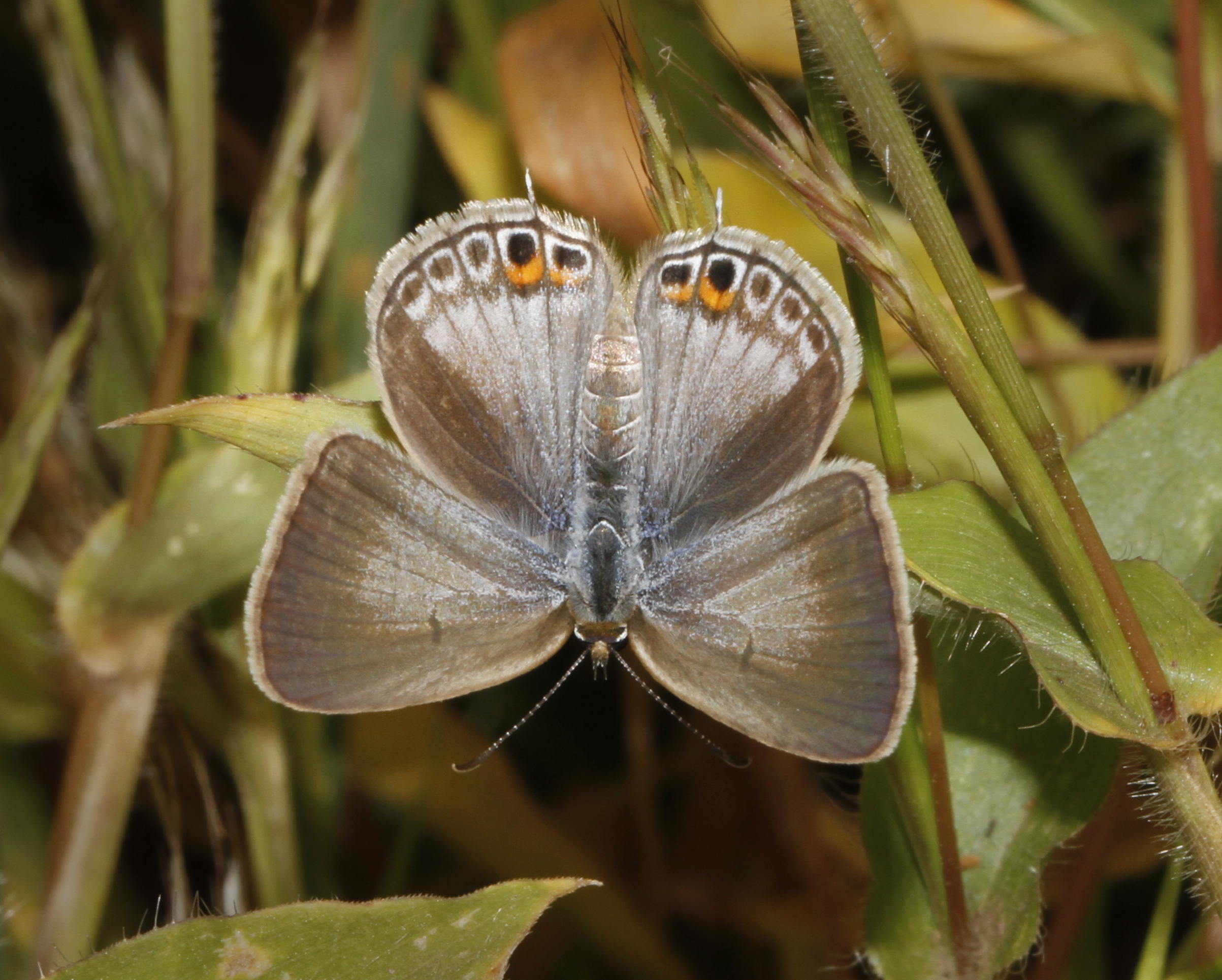
Upperside (female)

Underside: silver grey, in some with a pale yellowish, in others with a faint brown tint. Forewings and hindwings: each with the following brown spots edged slenderly on either side with white: a transverse elongate spot on the discocellulars; a transverse discal series of spots straight on the fore, bisinuate on the hindwing, on the latter wing capped near the costa by a prominent while-encircled round black spot; an inner and an outer subterminal transverse series of spots, of which the inner subterminal series on the hindwing is lunular, the outer rounded, the white edging to both series being also lunular; both wings have very slender anteciliary black lines, and the hindwing in addition a transverse curved subbasal series of generally three often four white-encircled spots of which the spot nearest the costa is prominent and block, the others brown. Antennae, head, thorax and abdomen dark brown, paler on the last, the shafts of the antennae speckled with white, the thorax with a little purplish pubescence; beneath: the palpi, thorax and abdomen white.

Female upperside: dark brown. Forewing: a posteromedial somewhat triangular area from the base outwards for about two-thirds the length of the wing blue and a slender jet-black anteciliary line. Hindwing: posteriorly from about the level of the middle of the cell slightly suffused with blue from base outwards for about two-thirds the length of the wing; a transverse, postdiscal, incomplete series of sagittate (arrowhead-shaped) white spots pointing inwards, followed by a subterminal transverse series of round spots, the anterior three dark brown encircled with bluish white, the tornal two jet-black, subequal, larger than the others, edged inwardly with bright ochraceous, outwardly by very slender white lines; finally, a jet-black slender anteciliary line. Cilia of both forewings and hindwings conspicuously white. Underside: ground colour and markings as in the male, the tornal two black spots touched outwardly with metallic bluish-green scaling. Antenna, head, thorax and abdomen similar to those of the male, the shafts of the antennae conspicuously ringed with white.

== Distribution ==
The species is spread from the Arabian Peninsula throughout India except at very high elevations and is widely distributed in the Malayan subregion; extending to Australia and the South Sea Islands.

== Host plants ==
The butterfly’s caterpillars commonly develop on members of the family Fabaceae, including Acacia caesia, Butea monosperma, Cajanus cajan, Canavalia ensiformis, Lablab purpureus, Macroptilium atropurpureum, Ougeinia oojeinensis, Paracalyx scariosus, Phaseolus spp., Pisum sativum, Pueraria phaseoloides, Vigna cylindrica, Vigna radiata, Vigna trilobata, Vigna unguiculata, and Vigna stipulacea.

== Larva ==
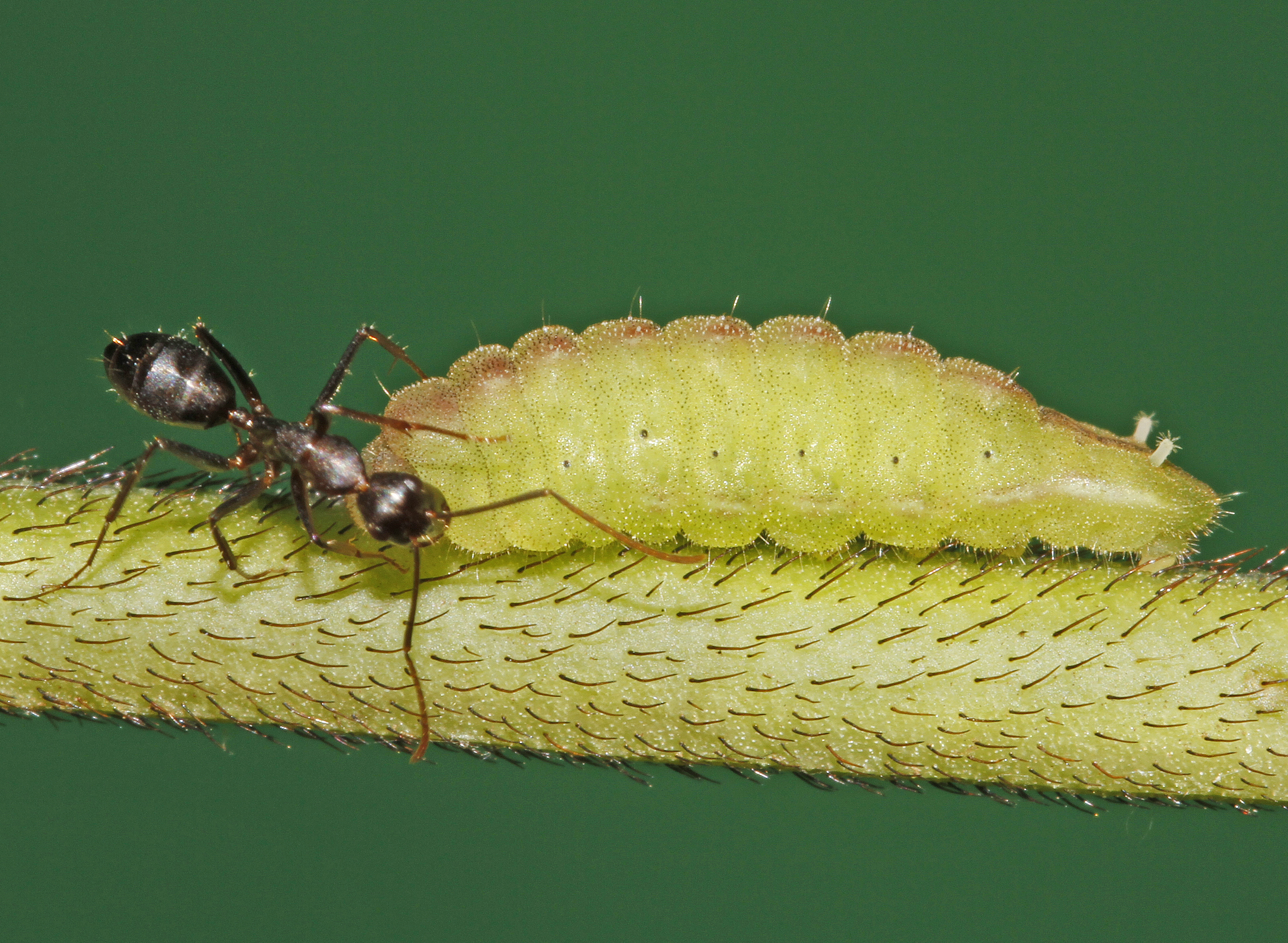
Larva

"Of the usual Lycaenid shape .... the head small, black, shining, retractile. Colour of body pale green with darker green or reddish dorsal and subdorsal lines, the latter coalesced into a broad band between the eleventh and last segments. The entire surface of the body covered with minute white tubercles, there are also a few scattered white hairs. The segmental constrictions shallow. Spiracles black. Extensile organs on the twelfth segment small. The larva is broader than high in its higher part, increasing in width to fourth segment, from thence to the flattened anal segment of about uniform width. Bred by me in Calcutta on Phaseolus trilobus. Mr. W. O. Taylor reports that the larva feeds in Orissa on Dolichos catjang, Roxb. Dr. A. Forel identifies the ant in Calcutta as Camponotus rubripes subspecies compressus" (de Niceville.)

== Pupa ==
"Very pale green, the abdominal segments somewhat opaque; of the usual Lycaenid shape, no distinctive structure or markings. Head-case square, thorax slightly humped, slightly constricted before the first abdominal segment, a dark dorsal line extending the whole length; spiracles black; entire surface smooth not hairy." (de Niceville.)

== Subspecies ==
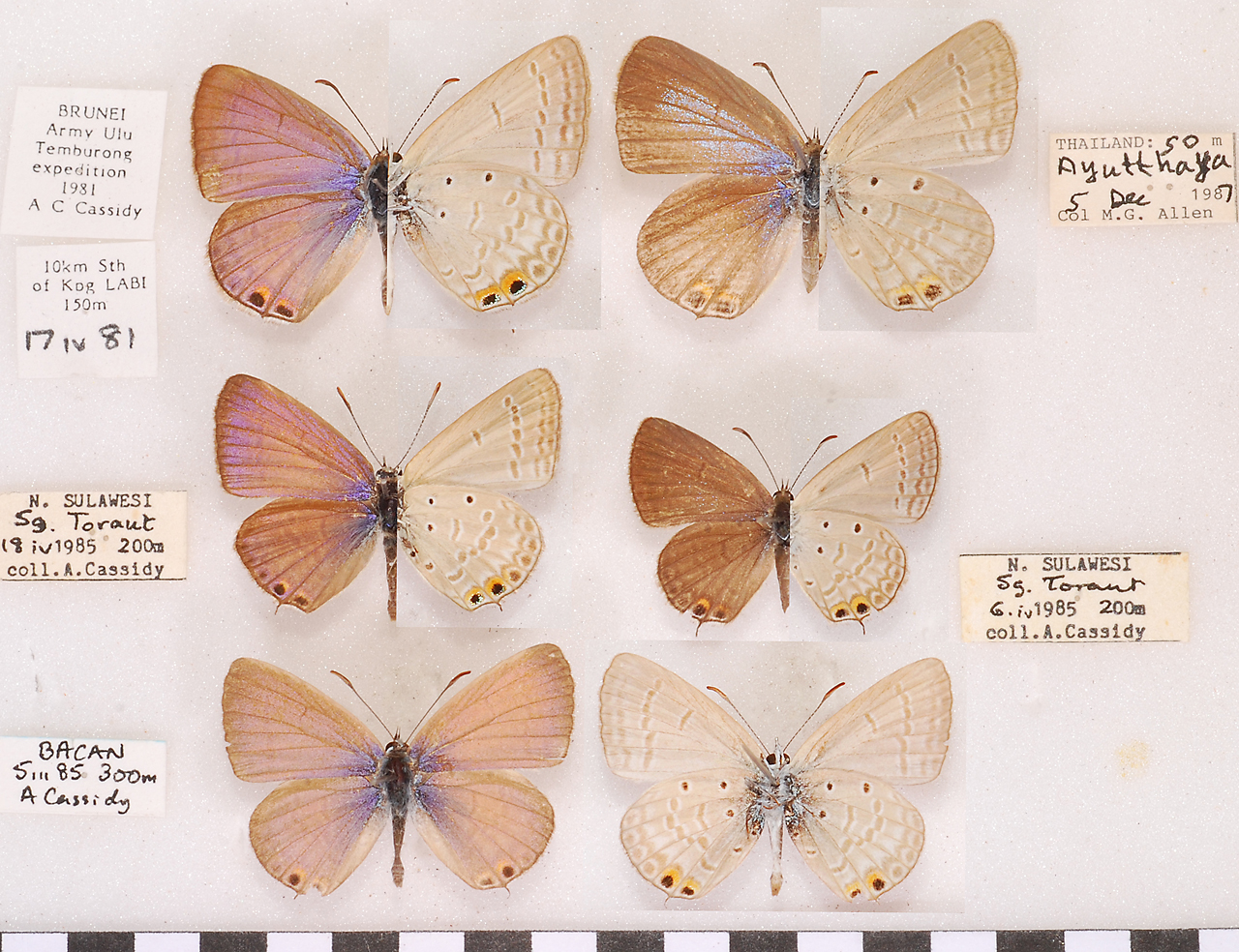
Euchrysops cnejus cnejus

- Euchrysops cnejus cnejus
- Euchrysops cnejus cnidus Waterhouse & Lyell, 1914 (Torres Strait Islands, northern Australia to Southport, New Guinea, Papua New Guinea, Bismarck Archipelago, Solomons)
- Euchrysops cnejus vitiensis (Butler, 1883) (Fiji)
- Euchrysops cnejus luzonicus (Röber, 1886) (Sangihe, Talaud, Philippines: Palawan, Cebu, Leyte, Luzon, Tawitawi)

== See also ==
- List of butterflies of India
- List of butterflies of India (Lycaenidae)
