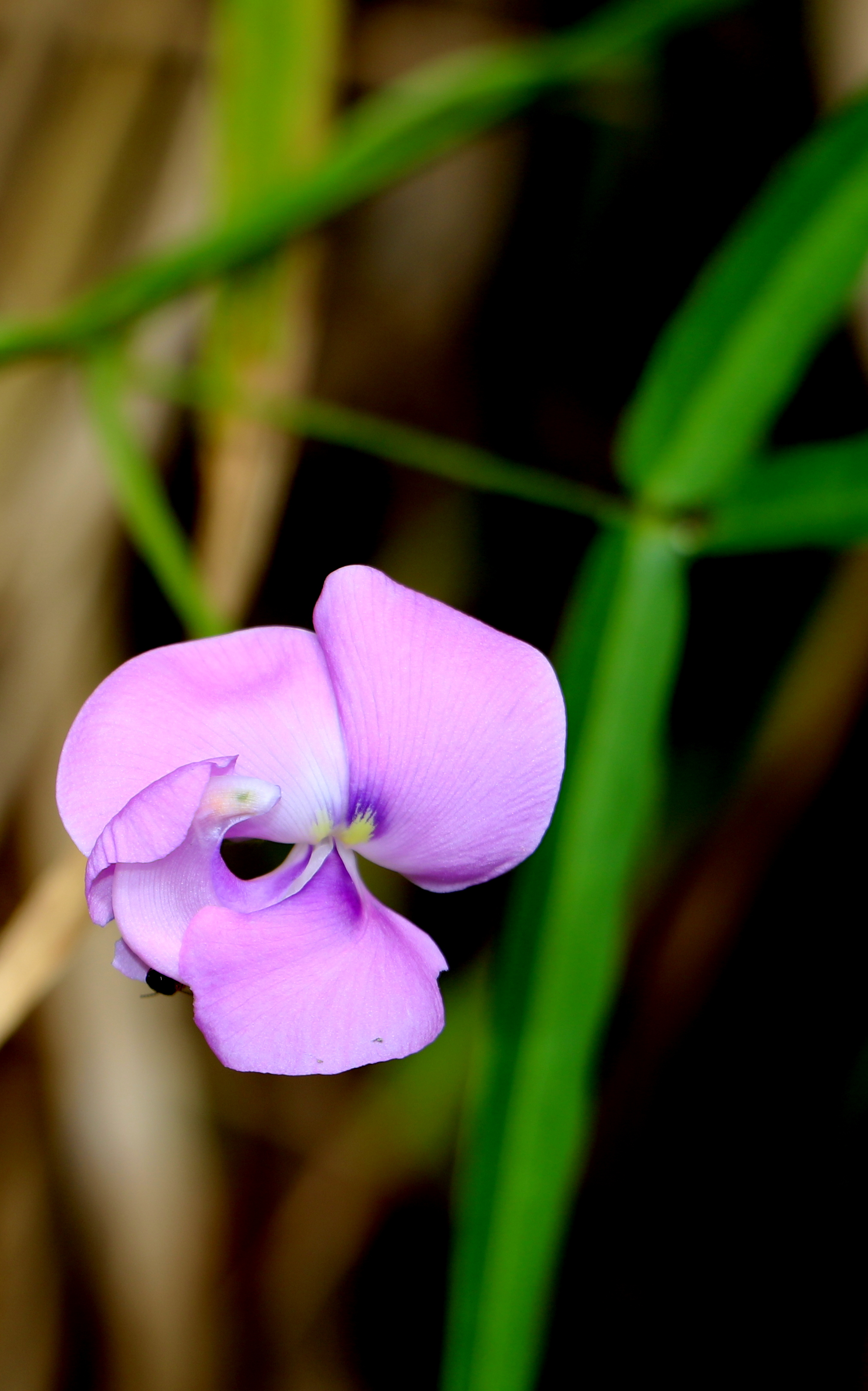
- Border Ranges National Park, Australia

Scientific classification
- Kingdom: Plantae
- Clade: Tracheophytes
- Clade: Angiosperms
- Clade: Eudicots
- Clade: Rosids
- Order: Fabales
- Family: Fabaceae
- Subfamily: Faboideae
- Genus: Vigna
- Species: V. vexillata
- Variety: V. v. var. angustifolia

Trinomial name
- Vigna vexillata var. angustifolia (K.Schum. & Thonn.) Baker

= Vigna vexillata var. angustifolia =

Wild cow pea

Variety of legume

Vigna vexillata var. angustifolia, known as the wild cow pea is a small climbing plant. A variety of the widespread tropical plant Vigna vexillata, found in Australia.
