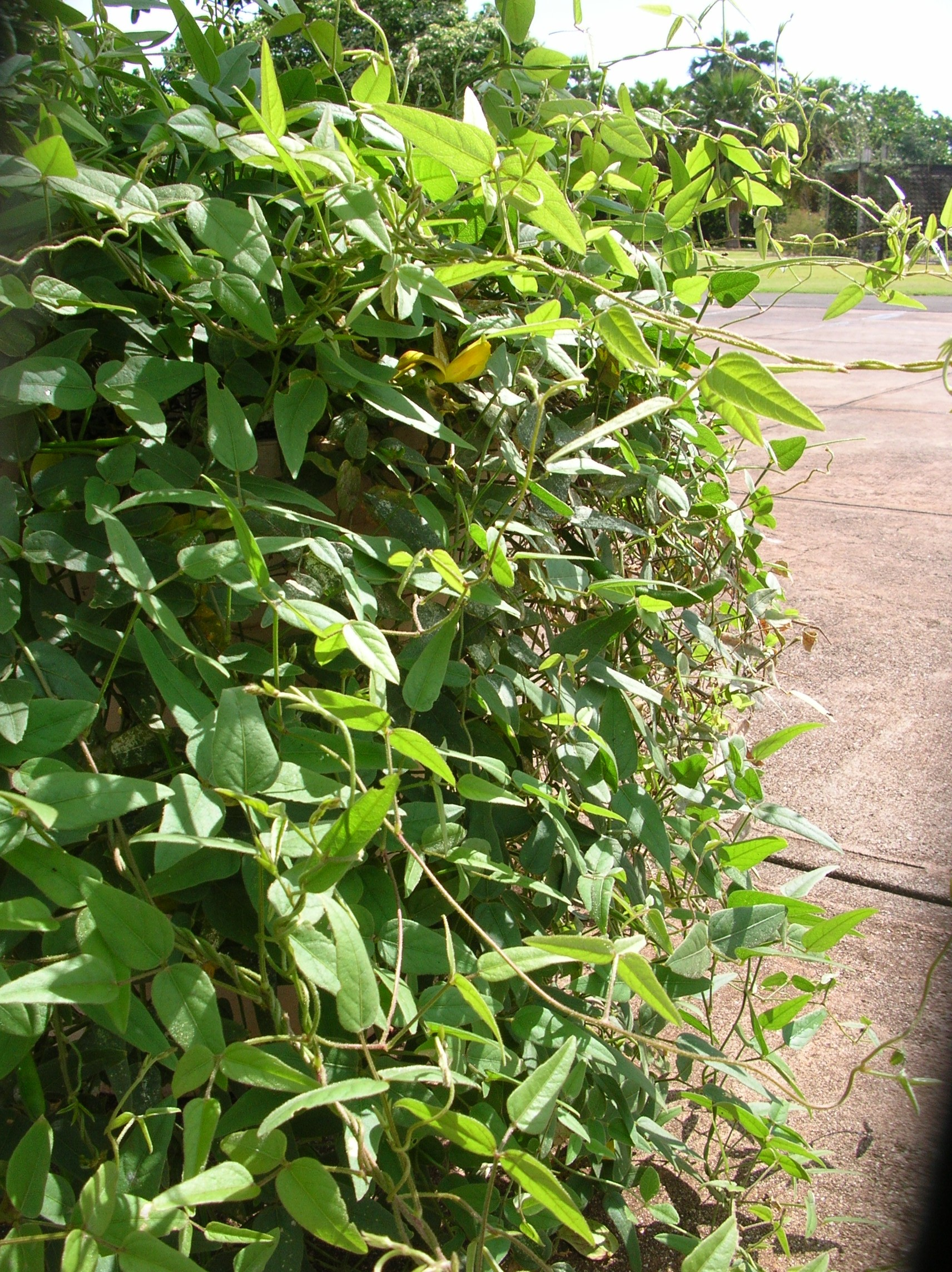

Conservation status
- Critically Imperiled (NatureServe)

Scientific classification
- Kingdom: Plantae
- Clade: Tracheophytes
- Clade: Angiosperms
- Clade: Eudicots
- Clade: Rosids
- Order: Fabales
- Family: Fabaceae
- Subfamily: Faboideae
- Genus: Vigna
- Species: V. owahuensis

Binomial name
- Vigna owahuensis Vogel

Synonyms
- Vigna sandwicensis

= Vigna owahuensis =

Species of legume

Vigna owahuensis is a rare species of flowering plant in the legume family known by the common name Oahu cowpea.

== Distribution ==
It is endemic to Hawaii, where it is known from seven small populations on the islands of Hawaii, Molokai, Lanai, and Kahoolawe. Though it was described from a specimen collected on Oahu it is now extirpated from that island. It was also known from Niihau, Maui, and Kauai in the past.

This plant grows in many types of shrubland and grassland habitat, as well as in some cultivated areas. It occurs on cinder cones and offshore islets and exposed coral reefs.

== Description ==
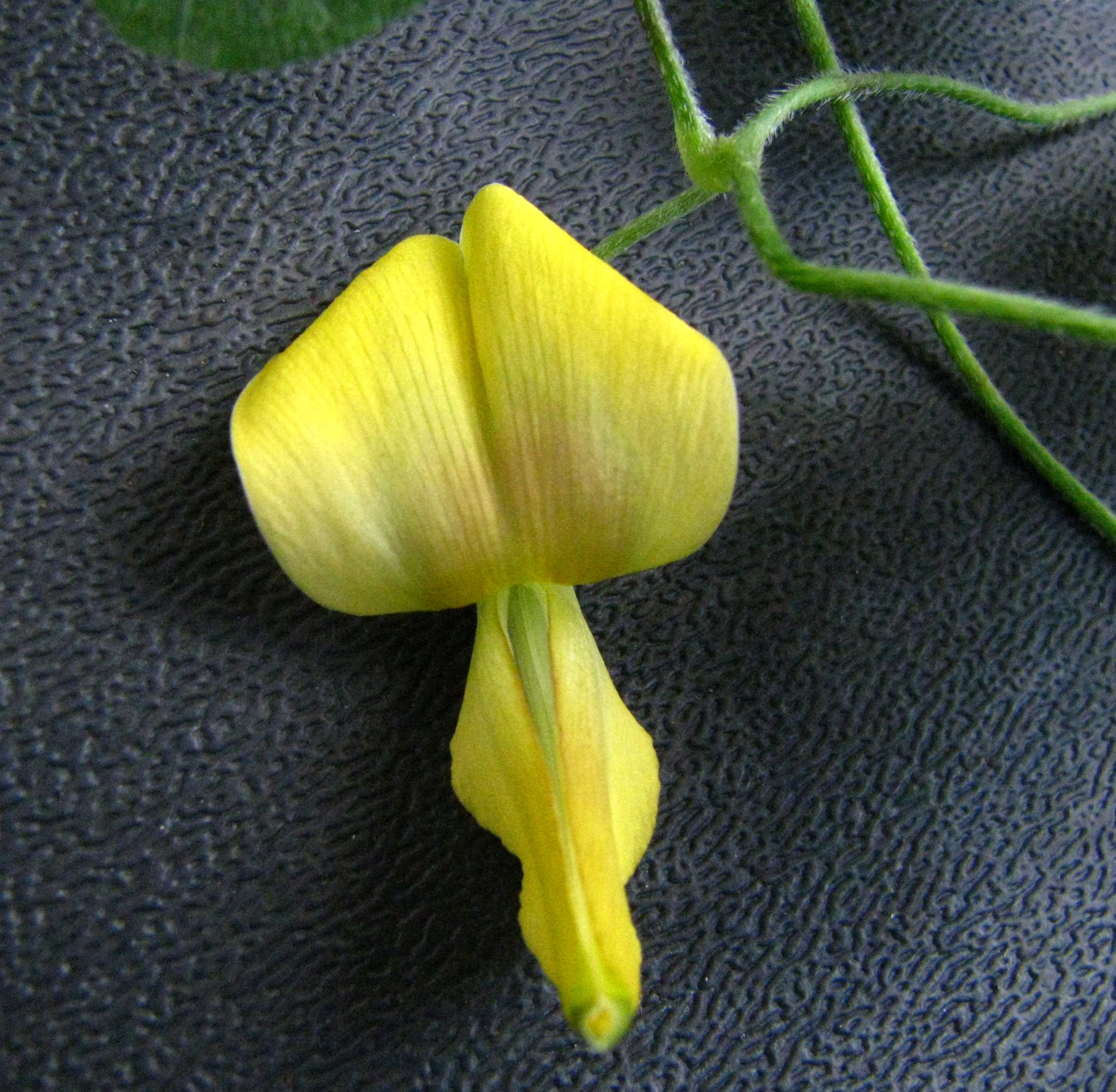
Flower of V. owahuensis

Vigna owahuensis is an annual or perennial herb growing up to 40 cm (16 in) long. Each leaf has three hairy leaflets of widely varying shape and size. Flowers occur singly or in clusters of up to four. They are light yellow or greenish in color and are about 2 or 2.5 cm (0.79 or 0.98 in) long. The fruit is a long, thin legume pod up to 9 cm (3.5 in) in length. The pod may be slightly inflated or not. It contains up to 15 gray or black beans around .5 cm (0.20 in) long.

== Conservation ==
The species faces many threats, including loss of habitat to agriculture and development, degradation of the habitat by exotic plants and animals, and military activity. It is a federally listed endangered species of the United States.

There are fewer than 100 individuals in total remaining on four islands. Two of the seven populations are on Molokai, one occurring in a plantation of tropical ash and pine trees. As of the year 1994 there was only one plant known on Lanai. There are several individuals on Hawaii and Kahoolawe.
