= Vigna dalzelliana =

Scientific classification
- Kingdom: Plantae
- Clade: Tracheophytes
- Clade: Angiosperms
- Clade: Eudicots
- Clade: Rosids
- Order: Fabales
- Family: Fabaceae
- Subfamily: Faboideae
- Genus: Vigna
- Species: V. dalzelliana

Binomial name
- Vigna dalzelliana (Kuntze) Verdc.

Synonyms
- Phaseolus dalzelliana Kuntze; Phaseolus dalzellii Cooke; Phaseolus pauciflorus Dalzell

Species of legume

Vigna dalzelliana is a perennial herb with yellow flowers that commonly is used as fodder. The plant is poorly understood and was previously confused with its relative Vigna minima.

== Description ==
Vigna dalzelliana is a twining herb. Its stems are slender and covered with minute hairs, or trichomes. Its leaf petioles are covered with the same white trichomes, and are 3–5 cm (1.2–2.0 in) long. Its leaflets are oval-shaped and pointy, or acuminate, towards their apex. The leaflets range from 4–6 cm (1.6–2.4 in) in length. The herb's inflorescence is axillary, meaning it rises from the same node as a leaf rather than from the end of a stem. The peduncle of the plant is covered with the same white trichomes as the stem. Its flower petals are a pale yellow.

== Habitat and ecology ==
The plant is common to Thailand, Cambodia, India and Sri Lanka, and grows between 5–2,500 m (16–8,202 ft) in altitude.

It is a common component of the ground flora in monsoon forests, and particularly Sal forests. It grows in shady wet highland slopes where the plant can root from stem nodes.

== Uses ==
Livestock often graze on the plant, and it is a good soil binder and can be used for soil conservation.

== Conservation ==
The monsoon forest habitat of the plant is threatened by the general expansion of human populations, especially by expansion of farmland. The species is listed as present in Sanjay Gandhi National Park in India and various national parks in Thailand. It is also present in the national gene bank in New Delhi.
