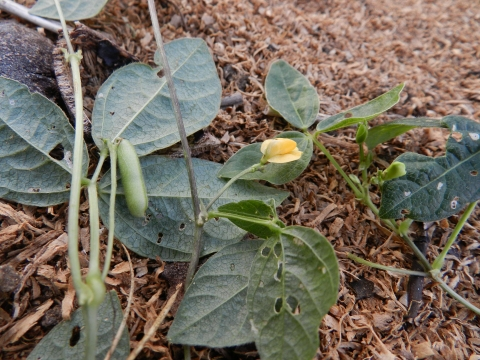
- Vigna hosei flower

Scientific classification
- Kingdom: Plantae
- Clade: Embryophytes
- Clade: Tracheophytes
- Clade: Spermatophytes
- Clade: Angiosperms
- Clade: Eudicots
- Clade: Rosids
- Order: Fabales
- Family: Fabaceae
- Subfamily: Faboideae
- Genus: Vigna
- Species: V. hosei

Binomial name
- Vigna hosei (Craib) Backer

Synonyms
- Dolichos hosei Craib.; Vigna oligosperma Backer

= Vigna hosei =

Species of legume

Vigna hosei, also known as the Sarawak bean, is a perennial legume that grows in low-lying, humid, tropical areas but more commonly disturbed or roadside areas.

== Description ==
Vigna hosei is a twining or creeping legume, often forming a thick ground cover. Its leaflets are ovate to elliptic, with thin, long hairs on both sides. The terminal leaflet is 3–7.5 cm (1.2–3.0 in) by 2–5 cm (0.79–1.97 in). The pod is 1–2 cm (0.39–0.79 in) long, black, and generally containing one to three seeds. Its flowers are yellow and 7–8 mm (0.28–0.31 in) by 7–10 mm (0.28–0.39 in). The pedicel is 1–3 mm (0.039–0.118 in) long and expands as the pod matures. The bracteoles are 1 cm (0.39 in) long and 1-nerved, and the calyx is slightly pubescent.

Besides producing normal flowers and pods, Vigna hosei also produces some flowers which remain concealed under a thick carpet of half-decayed leaves, originating from the plant itself, and which are set on a 2.5–6 cm (0.98–2.36 in) long pale stalk. These other flowers in a ripe state are very yellow, finely and quite densely pubescent, and have one to two seeds. They are generally 1–1.5 cm (0.39–0.59 in) long.

== Habitat and ecology ==
Vigna hosei is native to Taiwan, Indonesia, and Malaysia in tropical southeast Asia. It is also widely cultivated and has become naturalized in tropical Africa (Kenya, Tanzania, Rwanda, Mozambique, and Madagascar), Australia, the US states of Florida and Hawaii, and in the Caribbean.

It often forms thick ground cover and is found in grass at roadsides and in disturbed habitats or wastelands, on damp ground and on sandy loam from 20–200 m (66–656 ft) above sea level in Africa and anywhere under 500 m (1,600 ft) above sea level in southeast Asia.

It requires 2,500 mm (98 in) of annual rainfall, and due to its shallow root system it can withstand flooding but not drought. One of its most outstanding characteristics is its persistence under shade, but full sunlight is required for good seed production. It can grow in a wide range of soils but prefers acidic soils of pH 4.9 or less.

As a cover crop, Vigna hosei is susceptible to the fungus disease Rhizoctonia solani, which causes wilting of large patches of leaves. Wet weather favors the spread of the disease. Vigna hosei is also one of many plants able to be infected by the cucumber mosaic virus.

== Uses ==
Vigna hosei is used as a green manure and ground cover crop in young tree plantations as well as in rubber, tea, and coconut plantations. Its seedling growth is vigorous, and young plants quickly suppress weed growth, forming a thick mat of growth with a dense leaf litter, which protects the soil from erosion and prevents the ingress of weeds. Its ability to fix atmospheric nitrogen enriches the soil and promotes the growth of the trees. Due to its persistence under shade, the plant can enrich a mixture of leguminous covers for young plantation trees. It is also used as an animal forage and is tolerant to heavy grazing.
