= Vigna sahyadriana =

Scientific classification
- Kingdom: Plantae
- Clade: Tracheophytes
- Clade: Angiosperms
- Clade: Eudicots
- Clade: Rosids
- Order: Fabales
- Family: Fabaceae
- Subfamily: Faboideae
- Genus: Vigna
- Species: V. sahyadriana

Binomial name
- Vigna sahyadriana Aitawade, K.V.Bhat & S.R.Yadav

Species of plant

Vigna sahyadriana, the ranmug, is a species of flowering plant in the family Fabaceae. It is native to the northern Western Ghats of India. An annual climber, it is typically found on hill slopes and in grasslands. Described in 2012, it is a crop wild relative of the urdbean Vigna mungo.
