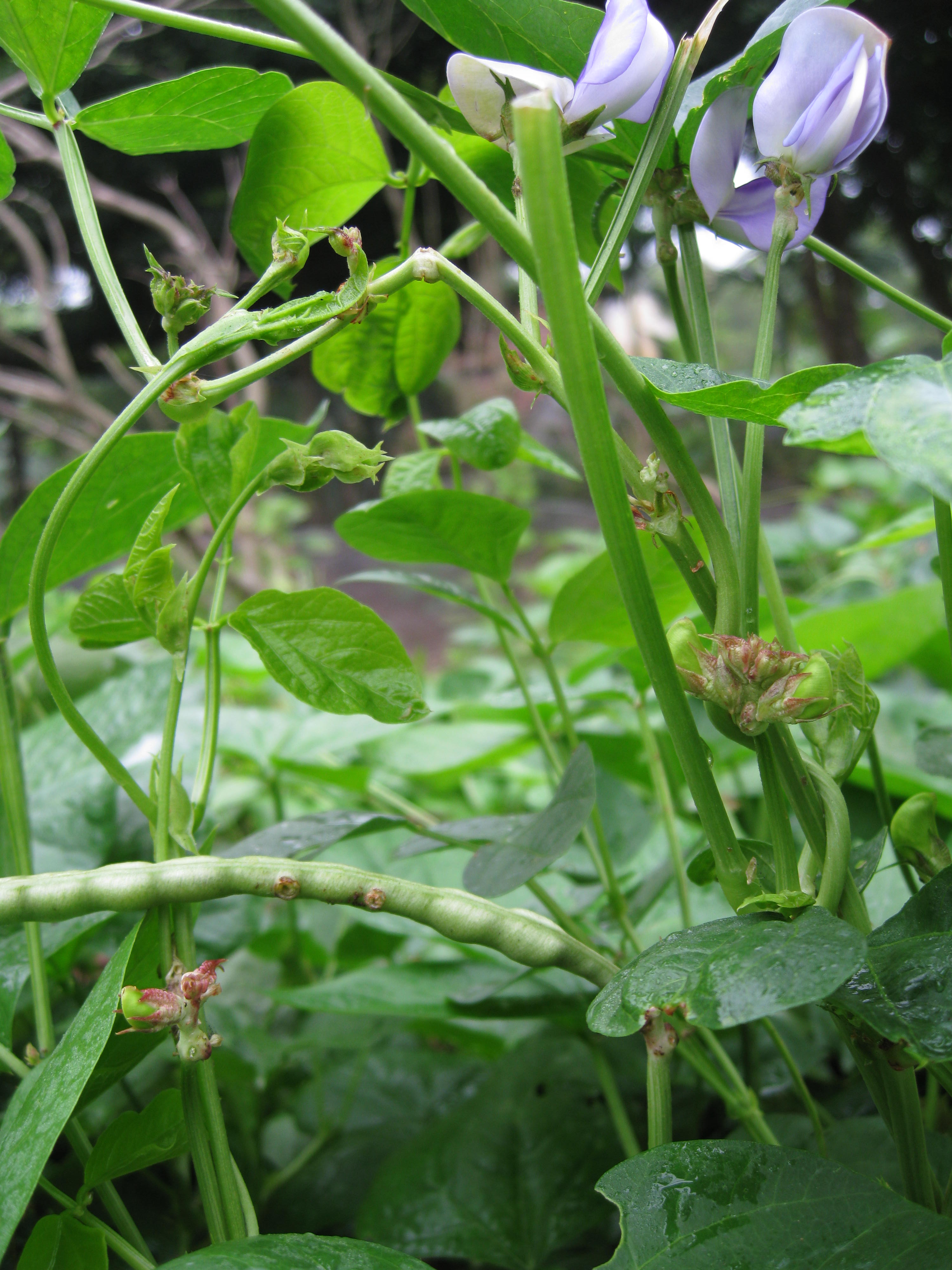

Scientific classification
- Kingdom: Plantae
- Clade: Tracheophytes
- Clade: Angiosperms
- Clade: Eudicots
- Clade: Rosids
- Order: Fabales
- Family: Fabaceae
- Subfamily: Faboideae
- Genus: Vigna
- Species: V. unguiculata
- Subspecies: V. u. subsp. cylindrica

Trinomial name
- Vigna unguiculata subsp. cylindrica

= Catjang =

Subspecies of flowering plant

Catjang (Vigna unguiculata subsp. cylindrica) is a subspecies of cowpea. The catjang plant is native to Africa, and is an erect densely branched shrubby perennial of Old World tropics. It now grows in other warm regions, as well. In the US, it is grown primarily as fodder, but elsewhere is used as a food crop. The name comes from Indonesian and Malay word kacang, a generic word for beans and nuts.

== Nutrition ==
Catjang is low in saturated fat and is a good source of dietary fiber, protein, iron, phosphorus, zinc, copper and manganese, and a very good source of folate and magnesium.
