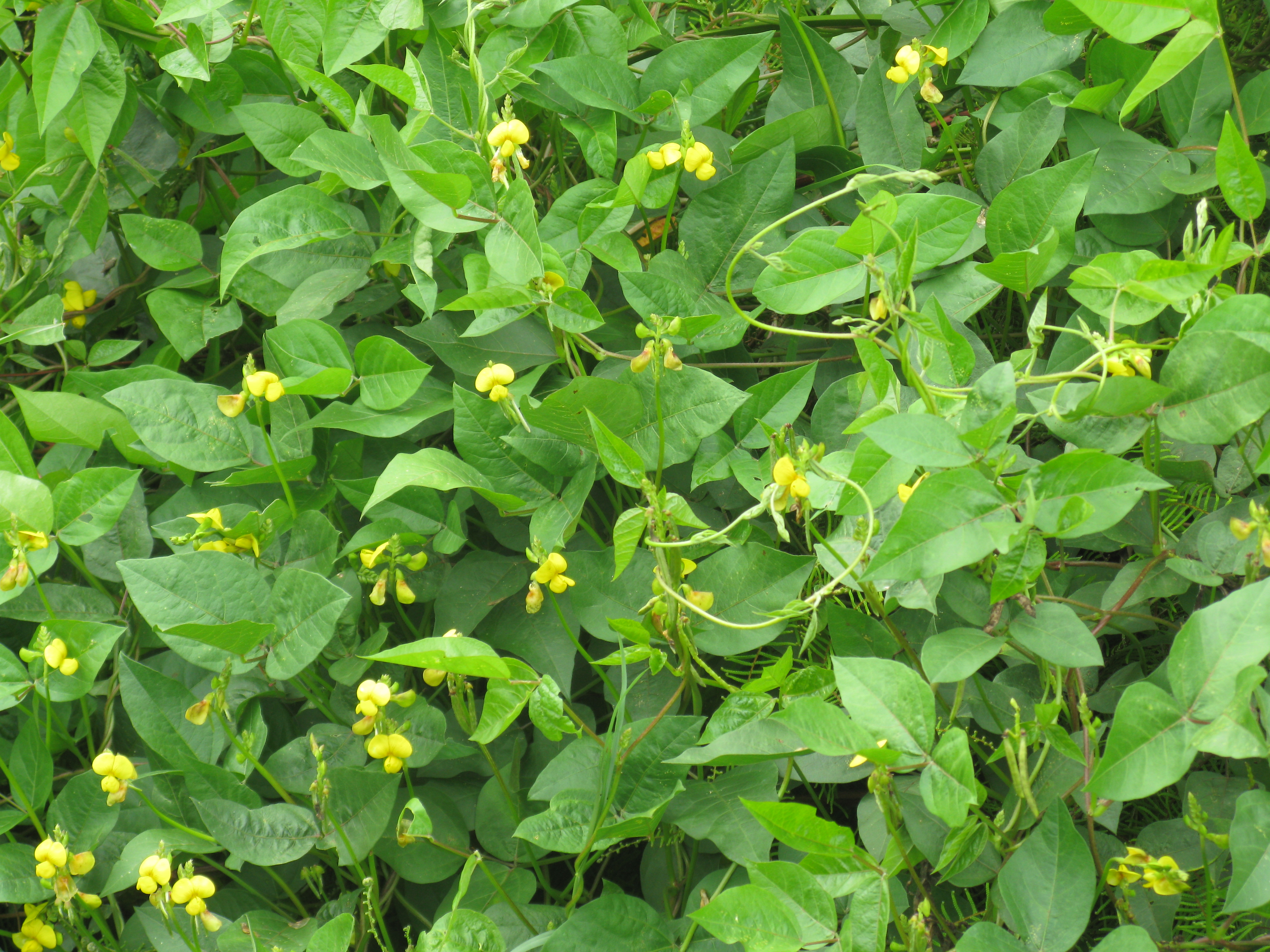
- Vigna luteola habit

Scientific classification
- Kingdom: Plantae
- Clade: Tracheophytes
- Clade: Angiosperms
- Clade: Eudicots
- Clade: Rosids
- Order: Fabales
- Family: Fabaceae
- Subfamily: Faboideae
- Genus: Vigna
- Species: V. luteola

Binomial name
- Vigna luteola (Jacq.) Benth.

Synonyms
- Calopogonium pendunculatum Standl.; Dolichos gangeticus Roxb.; Dolichos luteolus Jacq.; Dolichos luteus Sw.; Dolichos niloticus Delile; Dolichos repens L.; Orobus trifoliatus Sesse & Moc.; Phaseolus luetolus (Jacq.) Gagnep; Phaseolus marinus Burm.; Phaseolus maritimus Hassk.; Scytalis helicopus E. Mey.; Vigna brachystachys Benth.; Vigna bukombensis Harms.; Vigna fischeri Harms.; Vigna glabra Savi; Vigna helicopus (E. Mey.) Walp.; Vigna jaegeri Harms; Vigna longepedunculata Taub.; Vigna marina (Burm.) Merr.; Vigna nigerica A. Chev.; Vigna nilotica (Del.) Hook; Vigna oblonga Hook. f.; Vigna repens Kuntze; Vigna villosa Savi

= Vigna luteola =

Species of legume

Vigna luteola, commonly known as the hairy cowpea and the Nile bean, is a perennial vine found in many tropical and subtropical areas.

== Names ==
Vigna luteola is widely known in North America by the common names hairy cowpea or hairypod cowpea. This common name is derived from the Chickasaw waakimbala, which translates literally to "cow bean".

The vine also has a variety of other common names in South America and the Caribbean. In Cuba, the plant is known as frijol cimarrón, Spanish for "wild bean", in Venezuela the plant is known as bajuco marullero, and in the Bahamas the plant is known as yellow vigna.

== Description ==
=== Morphology ===
Vigna luteola is a hairy, short-lived perennial vine that occurs in moist soil and grows in either a spreading or climbing fashion. Its leaves are trifoliate, meaning they are a compound leaf of three leaflets. The leaflets are oval shaped and become acute at their apex. The leaflets are 2.5–10 cm (0.98–3.94 in) long, and 1.5–5 cm (0.59–1.97 in) wide. It has numerous yellow flowers that are 1.8–2.2 cm (0.71–0.87 in) long and are made of one large standard petal, two lateral wing petals, and two lower keel petals. This creates bilateral symmetry in the flower. It has thin, pubescent pods that are up to 5 cm (2.0 in) long and 5–6 mm (0.20–0.24 in) wide. The pods are range from green to brown or black. The pods contain numerous large black seeds, and the pod twists spirally when the seeds are dispersed.

=== Phytochemistry ===
The flavonoids quercetin and isorhamnetin are found in the leaves, and are thought to help the plant resist aphids. The seeds resist storage pests due to their high levels of phytic acid, trypsin, and cystatin.

== Taxonomy ==
Vigna luteola was first classified as Dolichos luteolus in 1771 by Nicholas von Jacquin, naming it from plants he cultivated in Vienna. In 1859, George Bentham moved it to the genus Vigna, classifying it as Vigna luteola. The name Luteola is derived from the Latin luteus, meaning "yellow", in reference to the plant's yellow flowers.

== Habitat and ecology ==
Vigna luteola can be found in tropical areas on many continents. Formerly native to the New World, the plant was brought into cultivation in Ethiopia and is now spread around the world.

Vigna luteola grows most commonly in coastal habitats on the Atlantic coast of the Americas, ranging from tropical regions of South and Central America to the Gulf Coast states, as far north as North Carolina. In Africa, the plant is most common in Zimbabwe, but ranges from Senegal to Ethiopia to Egypt, and can be found in the Middle East, in Australia, and is widespread across Asia.

It grows in swampy grasslands, on sandy lake shores, on stream sides, in wet pastures, in swamps, and in swamp forests. It prefers moist to wet clay soils, and will tolerate a wide range of salinities, from 0-10 ppt.

Cassius blue, grey hairstreak, long-tailed skipper, and dorantes skipper butterflies use it as a larval host plant, white-tailed deer often use it as a source of browsing, and ground-feeding birds often consume the seeds.

Oomyces langloisii grows from dead stems of the plant in North America.

== Uses ==
The flowers of Vigna luteola are eaten as a boiled vegetable in Ethiopia and Malawi, and the roots are chewed for the sweet juice. In Ethiopia, the leaves and flowers are mixed with Hagenia abyssinica to treat ulcers and syphilis. In Argentina, it is used to control cholesterol levels and is reported to have antimicrobial properties as well. It is also used to treat "ghost sickness", a supernatural ailment, in Polynesia.

Vigna luteola is most often considered a weed for crops due to its abundance. However, the plant is palatable for livestock and grows well in friable and slightly saline soils, meaning it is used as a pasture plant and as a ground cover in many countries, such as Ghana, Zambia, and Australia. However, its short lifespan and vulnerability to insects and frost can make it ineffective.

== Gallery ==
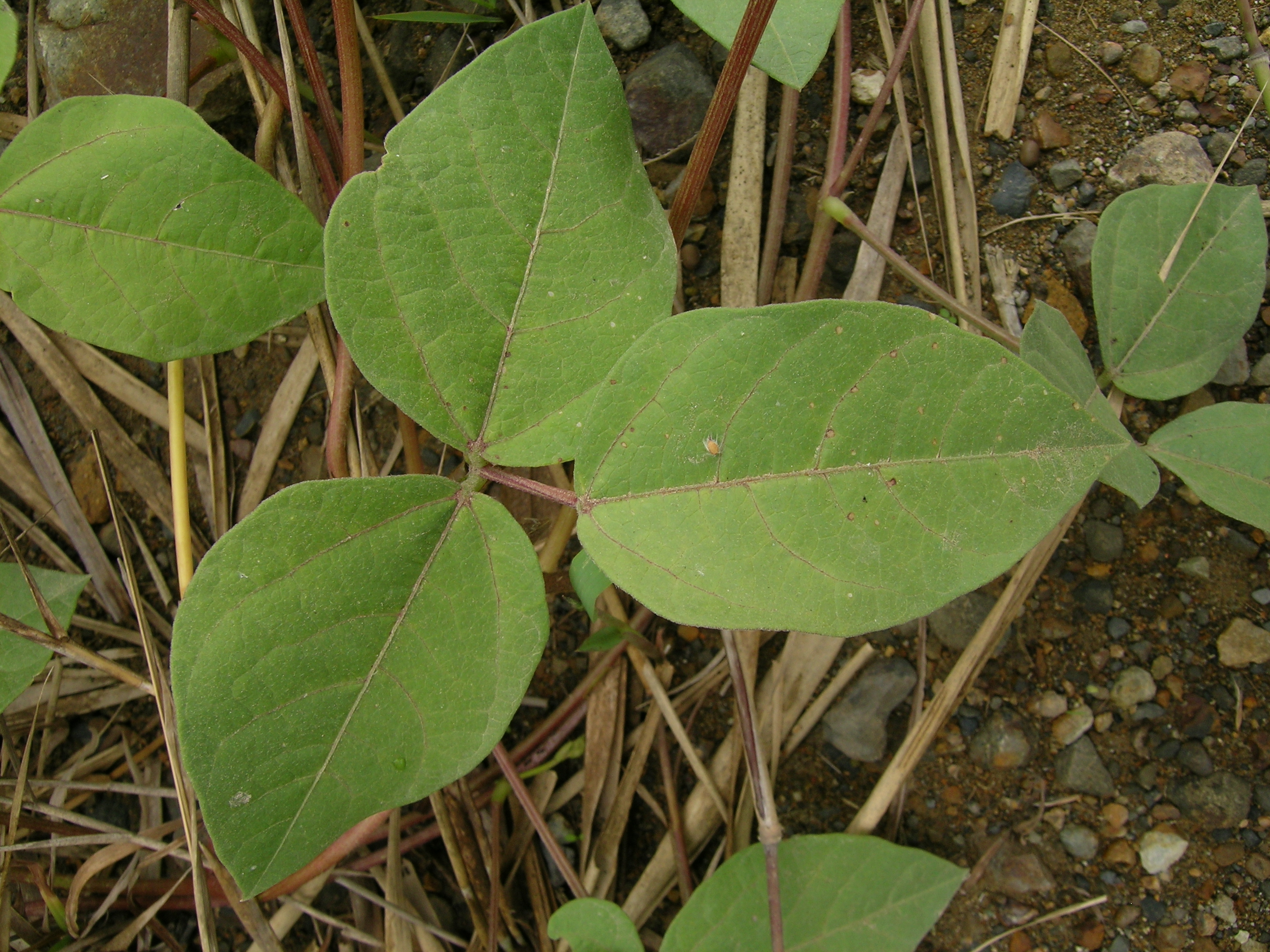
Trifoliate leaflets

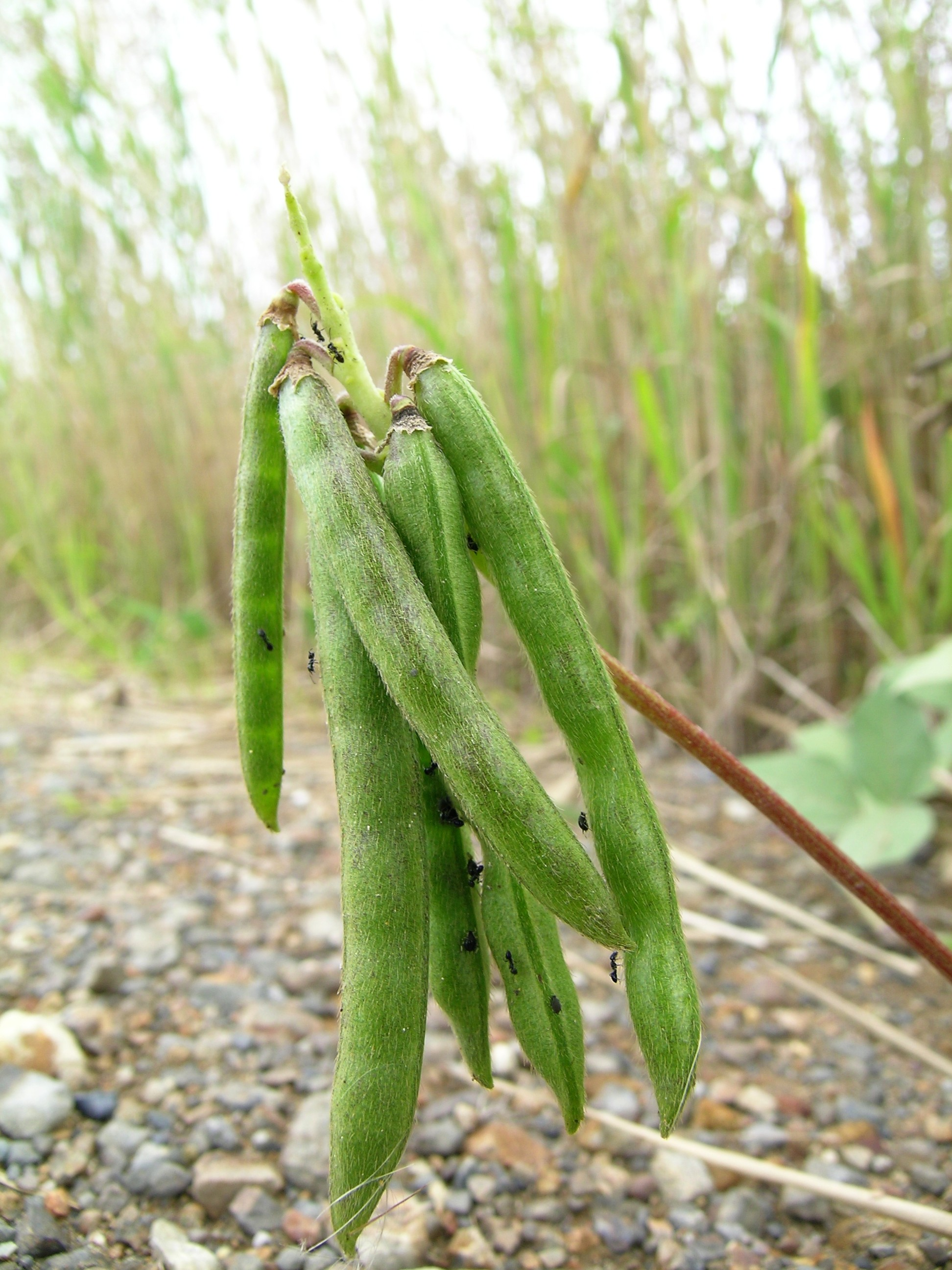
Pods containing seeds

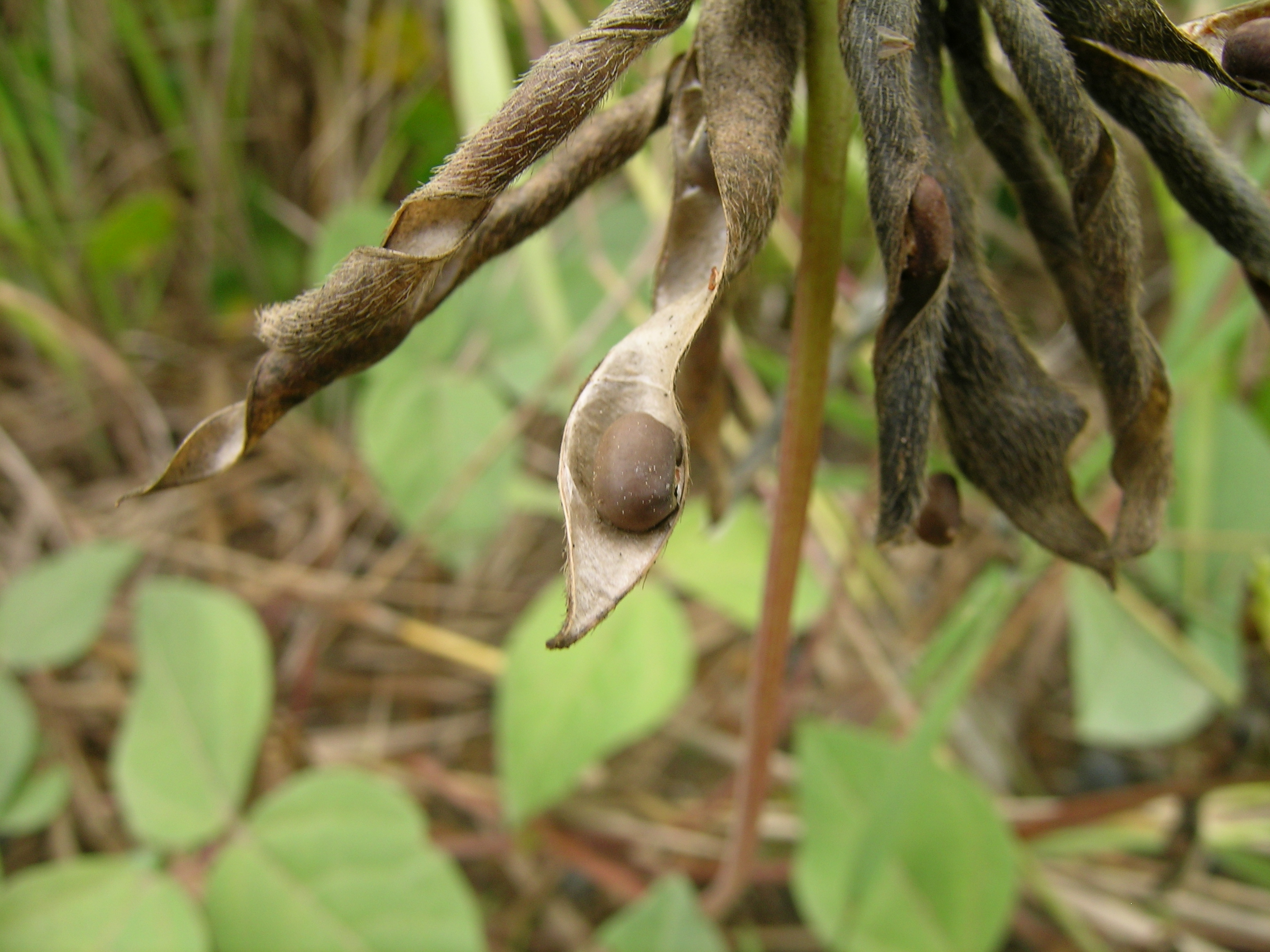
Pods dispersing seeds

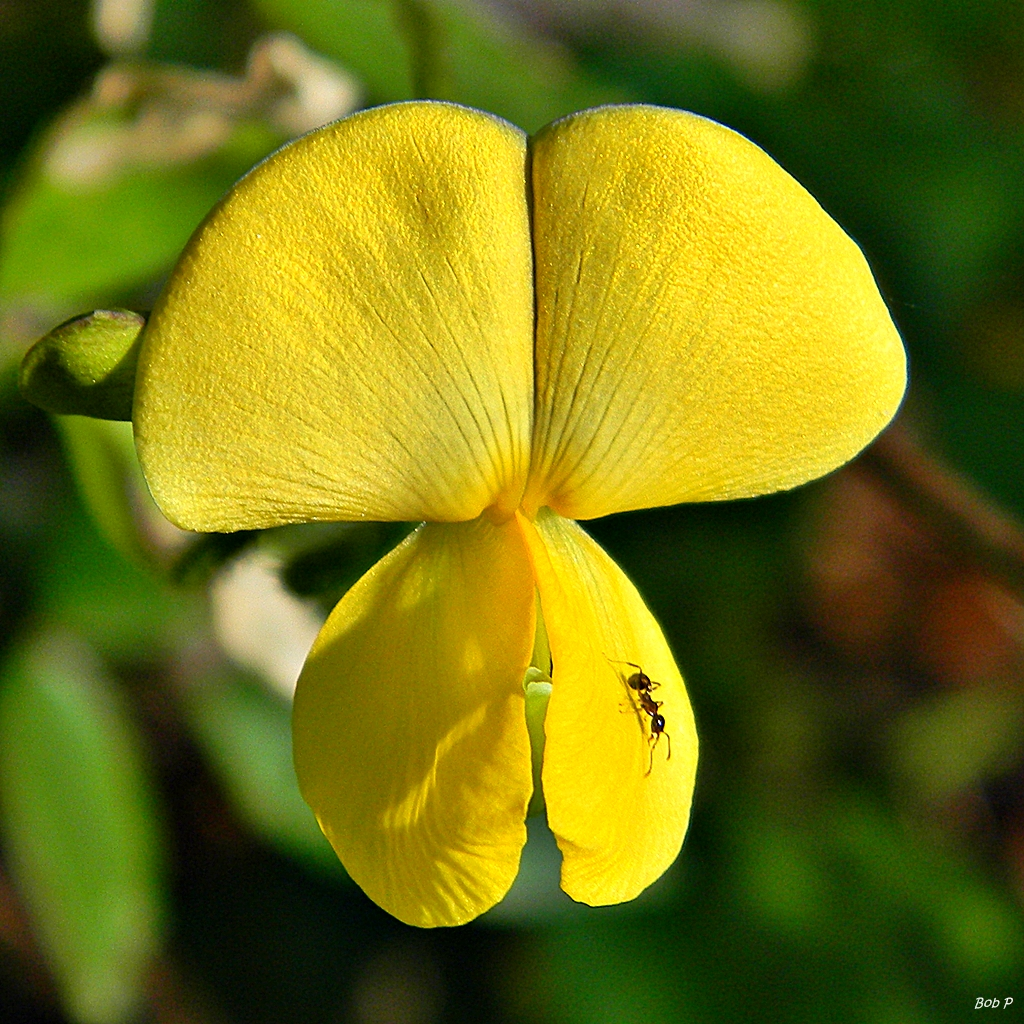
Flower with Pheidole megacephala
