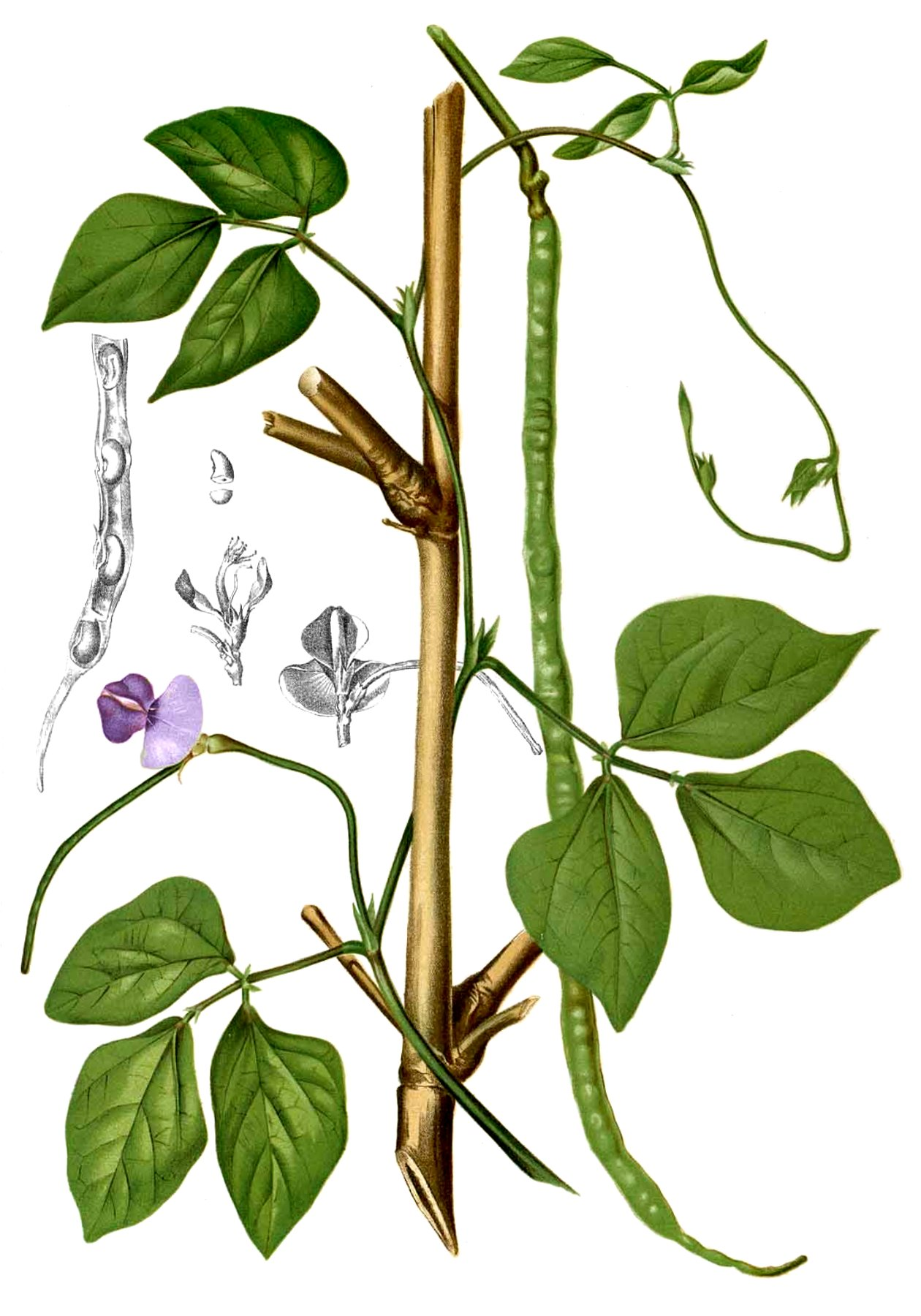
- Cowpea (Vigna unguiculata)

Scientific classification
- Kingdom: Plantae
- Clade: Tracheophytes
- Clade: Angiosperms
- Clade: Eudicots
- Clade: Rosids
- Order: Fabales
- Family: Fabaceae
- Subfamily: Faboideae
- Clade: Millettioids
- Tribe: Phaseoleae
- Subtribe: Phaseolinae
- Genus: Vigna; Savi (1824), nom. cons.

Subgenera
- Ceratotropis; Haydonia; Lasiospron; Plectrotropis; Vigna

Synonyms
- Azukia Takah. ex Ohwi (1953); Callicysthus Endl. (1833); Geolobus Raf. (1836); Haydonia R.Wilczek (1954); Liebrechtsia De Wild. (1902); Phasellus Medik. (1787); Plectrotropis Schumach. (1827); Rudua Maek. (1955); Scytalis E.Mey. (1836); Voandzeia Thouars (1806)

= Vigna =

Genus of plants

Vigna is a genus of plants in the legume family, Fabaceae, with a pantropical distribution. It includes some well-known cultivated species, including many types of beans. Some members of the genus were previously classified in Phaseolus. According to Hortus Third, Vigna differs from Phaseolus in biochemistry and pollen structure, and in the details of the style and stipules.

Vigna is also commonly confused with the genus Dolichos, but the two differ in stigma structure.

Vigna are herbs or occasionally subshrubs. The leaves are pinnate, divided into 3 leaflets. The inflorescence is a raceme of yellow, blue, or purple pea flowers. The fruit is a legume pod of varying shapes containing seeds.

Familiar food species include the adzuki bean (V. angularis), the black gram (V. mungo), the cowpea (V. unguiculata, including the variety known as the black-eyed pea), and the mung bean (V. radiata). Each of these may be used as a whole bean, a bean paste, or as bean sprouts.

The genus is named after Domenico Vigna, a seventeenth-century Italian botanist and director of the Orto botanico di Pisa.

== Uses ==
Root tubers of Vigna species have traditionally been used as food by the Indigenous Peoples of the Northern Territory of Australia.

== Selected species ==
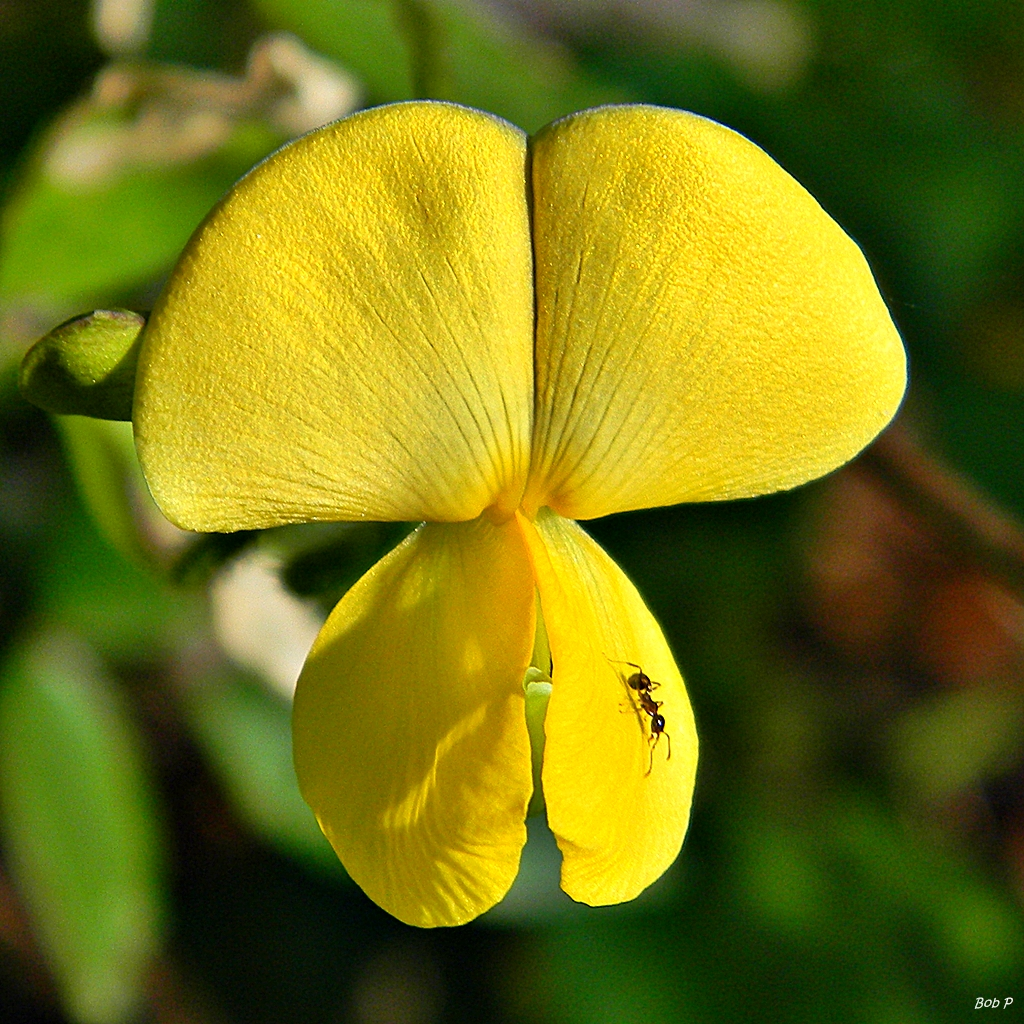
Vigna luteola

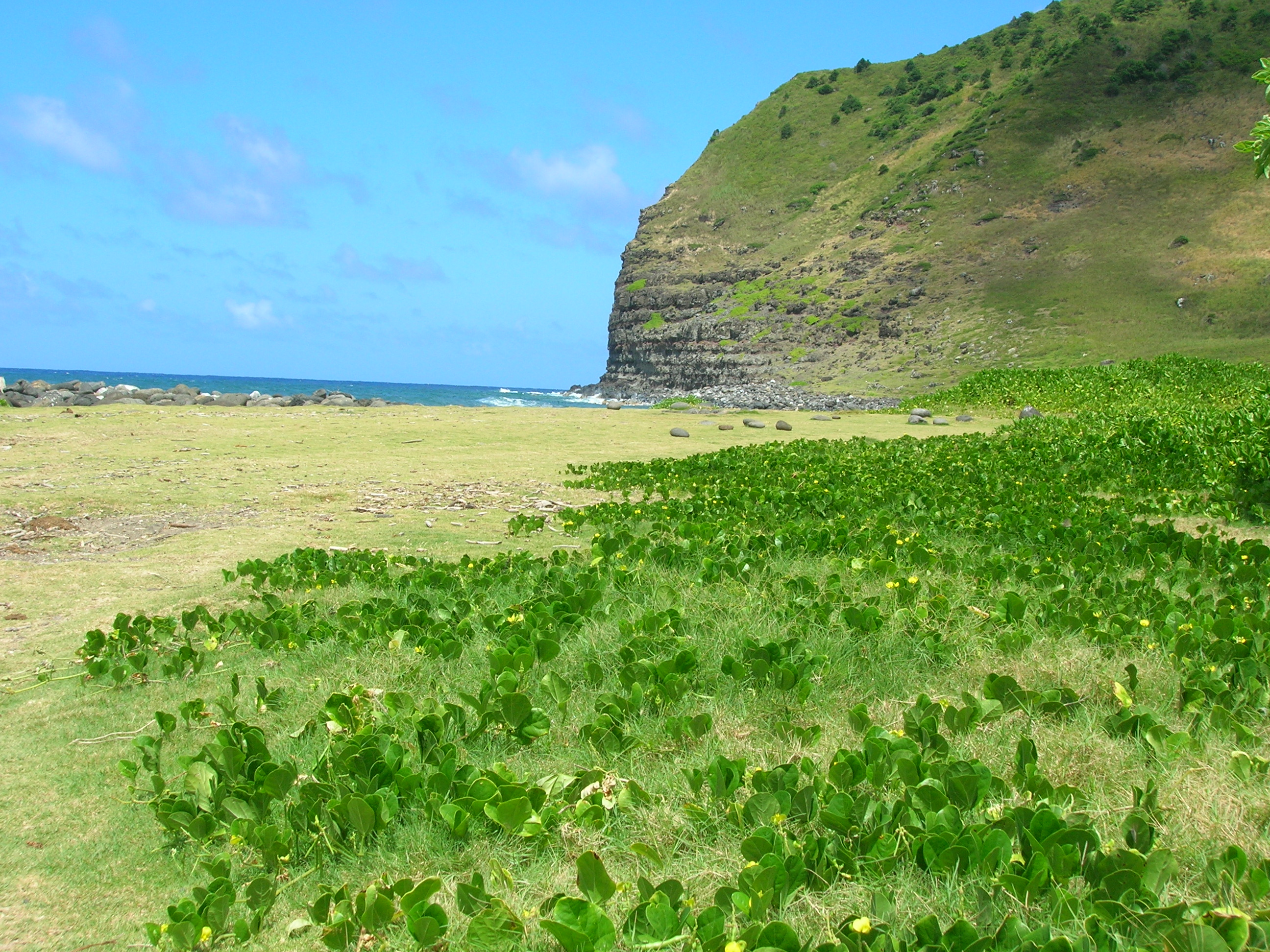
Vigna marina

The genus Vigna contains at least 90 species, including:

=== Subgenus Ceratotropis ===
- Vigna aconitifolia (Jacq.) Maréchal—moth bean, mat bean, Turkish gram
- Vigna angularis (Willd.) Ohwi & H. Ohashi—adzuki bean, red bean
  - Vigna angularis var. angularis (Willd.) Ohwi & H. Ohashi
  - Vigna angularis var. nipponensis (Ohwi) Ohwi & H. Ohashi
- Vigna glabrescens Maréchal et al.
- Vigna grandiflora (Prain) Tateishi & Maxted
- Vigna hirtella Ridley
- Vigna minima (Roxb.) Ohwi & H. Ohashi
- Vigna mungo (L.) Hepper—black gram, black lentil, white lentil, urd-bean, urad bean
  - Vigna mungo var. silvestris Lukoki, Maréchal & Otoul
- Vigna nakashimae (Ohwi) Ohwi & H. Ohashi
- Vigna nepalensis Tateishi & Maxted
- Vigna radiata (L.) Wilczek—mung bean, green gram, golden gram, mash bean, green soy, celera-bean, Jerusalem-pea
  - Vigna radiata var. radiata (L.) Wilczek
  - Vigna radiata var. sublobata (Roxb.) Verdc.
- Vigna reflexopilosa Hayata—Creole-bean
  - Vigna reflexopilosa var. reflexopilosa Hayata
  - Vigna reflexopilosa var. glabra Tomooka & Maxted
- Vigna riukiuensis (Ohwi) Ohwi & H. Ohashi
- Vigna sahyadriana Aitawade, K.V.Bhat & S.R.Yadav
- Vigna stipulacea Kuntze
- Vigna subramaniana (Babu ex Raizada) M. Sharma
- Vigna tenuicaulis N. Tomooka & Maxted
- Vigna trilobata (L.) Verdc.—jungle mat bean, jungli-bean, African gram, three-lobe-leaved cowpea
- Vigna trinervia (Heyne ex Wall.) Tateishi & Maxted
- Vigna umbellata (Thunb.) Ohwi & H. Ohashi—ricebean, red bean, climbing mountain-bean, mambi bean, Oriental-bean

=== Subgenus Haydonia ===
- Vigna monophylla Taub.
- Vigna nigritia Hook. f.
- Vigna schimperi Baker
- Vigna triphylla (R. Wilczek) Verdc.

=== Subgenus Lasiospron ===
- Vigna diffusa (Scott-Elliot) A. Delgado & Verdc.
- Vigna juruana (Harms) Verdc.
- Vigna lasiocarpa (Mart. ex Benth.) Verdc.
- Vigna longifolia (Benth.) Verdc.
- Vigna schottii (Bentham) A. Delgado & Verdc.
- Vigna trichocarpa (C. Wright ex Sauvalle) A. Delgado
- Vigna vexillata (L.) A. Rich.—zombi pea, wild cowpea
  - Vigna vexillata var. angustifolia
  - Vigna vexillata var. youngiana

=== Subgenus Vigna ===
- Vigna ambacensis Welw. ex Bak.
- Vigna angivensis Baker
- Vigna filicaulis Hepper
- Vigna friesiorum Harms
- Vigna gazensis Baker f.
- Vigna hosei (Craib) Backer—Sarowak/Sarawak bean
- Vigna luteola (Jacq.) Benth.—Dalrymple vigna
- Vigna membranacea A. Rich.
  - Vigna membranacea subsp. caesia (Chiov.) Verdc.
  - Vigna membranacea subsp. membranacea A. Rich.
- Vigna monantha Thulin
- Vigna racemosa (G. Don) Hutch. & Dalziel
- Vigna subterranea (L.) Verdc.—Bambara groundnut, Congo goober, hog-peanut, jugo bean, njugumawe (Swahili) (sometimes separated in Voandzeia)
- Vigna unguiculata (L.) Walp.—cowpea, crowder pea, Southern pea, Reeve's-pea, snake-bean
  - Vigna unguiculata subsp. cylindrica—catjang
  - Vigna unguiculata subsp. dekindtiana—wild cowpea, African cowpea, Ethiopian cowpea
  - Vigna unguiculata subsp. sesquipedalis—yardlong bean, long-podded cowpea, asparagus bean, Chinese long bean, pea-bean
  - Vigna unguiculata subsp. unguiculata—black-eyed pea, black-eyed bean

=== Incertae sedis ===
- Vigna comosa
- Vigna dalzelliana
- Vigna debilis Fourc.
- Vigna decipiens
- Vigna dinteri Harms
- Vigna dolichoides Baker in Hooker f.
- Vigna frutescens
- Vigna gracilis
- Vigna kirkii
- Vigna lanceolata—pencil yam, Maloga-bean, parsnip-bean, merne arlatyeye (Arrernte)
- Vigna lobata (Willd.) Endl.
- Vigna lobatifolia
- Vigna marina (Burm.f.) Merr.—dune-bean, notched cowpea, sea-bean, mohihihi, nanea (Hawaiian)
- Vigna multiflora
- Vigna nervosa
- Vigna oblongifolia
- Vigna owahuensis Vogel—Oahu cowpea
- Vigna parkeri—creeping vigna
- Vigna pilosa
