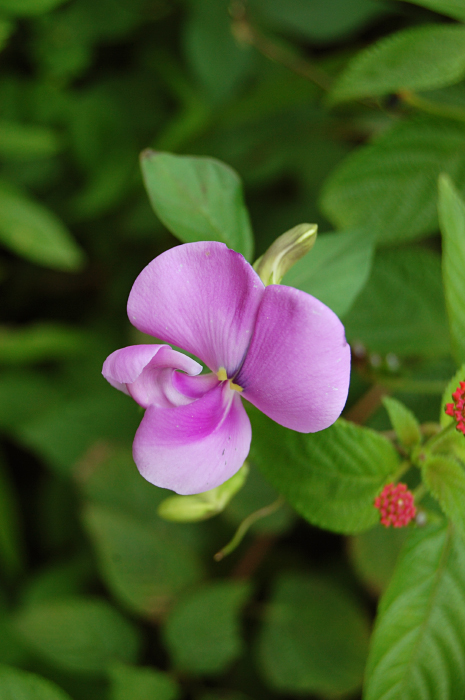
- Vigna vexillata flower

Scientific classification
- Kingdom: Plantae
- Clade: Tracheophytes
- Clade: Angiosperms
- Clade: Eudicots
- Clade: Rosids
- Order: Fabales
- Family: Fabaceae
- Subfamily: Faboideae
- Genus: Vigna
- Species: V. vexillata

Binomial name
- Vigna vexillata (L.) A. Rich

Synonyms
- Dolichos cylindricus Desv.; Dolichos vexillatus (L.) Kunth; Phaseolus capensis sensu Thunb.; Phaseolus glycinaeformus Weinm.; Phaseolus humifusus Savi; Phaseolus pulniensis Wight; Phaseolus quadriflorus A. Rich.; Phaseolus sepiarius Dalzell; Phaseolus vexillatus L.; Plectrotropis angustifolia Schumach & Thonn.; Plectrotropis hirsuta Schum. & Thonn.; Strophostyles capensis E. Mey.; Vigna capensis (Thunb.) Burtt Davy; Vigna carinalis Benth.; Vigna crinita A. Rich.; Vigna davyi Bolus; Vigna dinteri Harms; Vigna dolichoneura Harms; Vigna golungensis Baker; Vigna hirta Hook.; Vigna lobatifolia Baker; Vigna phaseoloides Baker; Vigna scabra Sond.; Vigna senegalensis A. Chev.; Vigna thonningii Hook. f; Vigna tuberosa A. Richard

= Vigna vexillata =

Species of legume

Vigna vexillata, the Zombi pea or wild cowpea, is a variable, perennial climbing plant that is pantropical, found in regions such as Ethiopia, Nigeria, and Venezuela.

== Description ==
Vigna vexillata is a strong twiner with fusiform, tuberous roots. Its stems are usually clothed with brownish silky hairs, or trichomes.. Its leaflets come in three, which are oval-shaped and pointed at the tip, with the terminal leaflet being 7.5–15 cm (3.0–5.9 in) long. The leaflets are all a dark green and with appressed trichomes on both surfaces. The flowers are pink or purplish to yellow and 2.5 cm (0.98 in) long, on two- to four-flowered peduncles 7.5–30 cm (3.0–11.8 in) long, with the keel prolonged into an uncurved beak. The flowers are sweetly scented. The pod is recurved, linear, 7.5–9 cm (3.0–3.5 in) long, and silky.

The stems tend to scramble over the ground and twine into the surrounding vegetation. It has good seedling vigor and good wet-season growth, and is effective in weed suppression. The seed shatters and it is not a good standover feed for the dry season. It is susceptible to both frost and fire. Although hairy, the plant is quite palatable.

== Habitat and ecology ==
Vigna vexillata thrives in a wide range of conditions, mostly in grasslands and in disturbed areas, as well as a weed.

In India, the plant flourishes from 1,200–1,500 m (3,900–4,900 ft) in altitude in the foothills of the Himalayas and in the hills of eastern and north-eastern India.

In Australia, it grows in the north where monsoons with 1,250–1,500 mm (49–59 in) of rainfall and a long dry season are common, growing on acidic soils rich in aluminum.

== Uses ==
The plant is a very important food crop in several areas, such as Namibia, where it is commonly harvested from the wild for local use. Its use has spread beyond its native range and the plant is now sometimes cultivated for its edible tubers. It is also grown as a green manure and ground cover crop, especially in poor soils.

The root is consumed raw or cooked. The tubers have a soft, easily peeled skin and creamy flesh. They are boiled or roasted and are particularly rich in protein. The young leaves, young pods, and seeds are also cooked and eaten as a vegetable.
