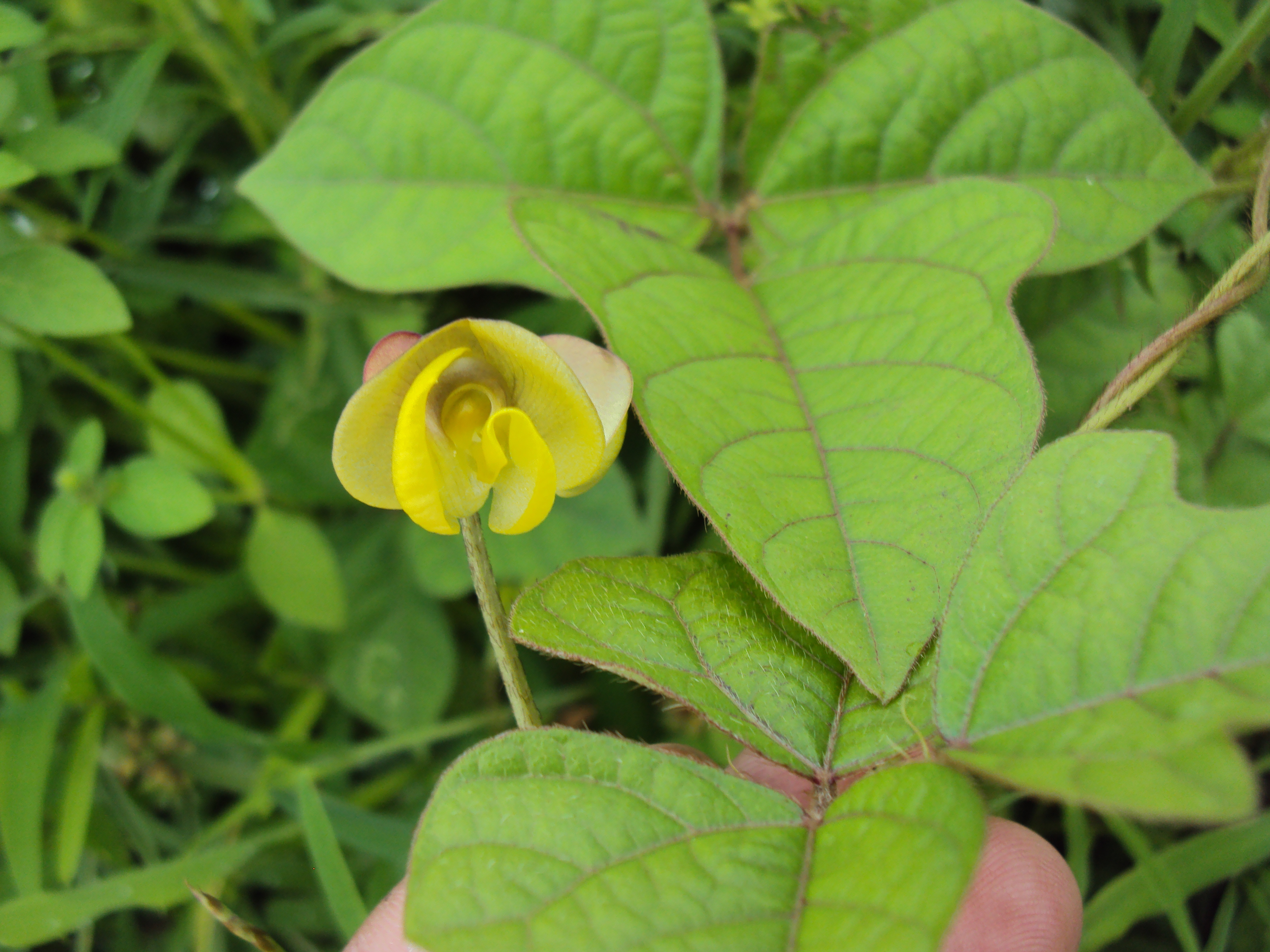
- Vigna trilobata flower

Scientific classification
- Kingdom: Plantae
- Clade: Tracheophytes
- Clade: Angiosperms
- Clade: Eudicots
- Clade: Rosids
- Order: Fabales
- Family: Fabaceae
- Subfamily: Faboideae
- Genus: Vigna
- Species: V. trilobata

Binomial name
- Vigna trilobata (L.) Verdc.

Synonyms
- Dolichos trilobatus; Phaseolus trilobus; P. trilobus auct.

= Vigna trilobata =

Species of legume

Vigna trilobata, the three-lobe-leaf cowpea or jungle mat bean, is a regenerating annual (though occasionally perennial) herb found in India, Pakistan, Sri Lanka, Burma, Afghanistan and the Malay archipelago.

== Description ==
Vigna trilobata is an annual or perennial legume. It has reddish stems, glabrous or rarely pubescent, which are prostrate and trailing (rarely weakly twining) to 50 cm (20 in). The leaves are trifoliolate, on petioles 1–11 cm (0.39–4.33 in) long, with leaflets ovate in outline that are 0.8–4.5 cm (0.31–1.77 in) long and 0.6–4 cm (0.24–1.57 in) wide. The leaves are also glabrous to sub-glabrous and usually shiny. The stipules are peltate, sometimes spurred, and are ovate, 4–15 mm (0.16–0.59 in) long. The inflorescence is a few-flowered raceme, with the peduncle being 2–22.5 cm (0.79–8.86 in) long, the pedicels 1–2.5 mm (0.039–0.098 in) long, and the calyx 2.5 mm (0.098 in) long and glabrous, with minute teeth. The corolla is yellow and 5–7 mm 5–7 cm (2.0–2.8 in) long. The pods are cylindrical, 1.5–5 cm (0.59–1.97 in) long and 2.5–3 mm (0.098–0.118 in) wide, from glabrous to sparingly pubescent with short adpressed hairs, and are black when ripe.

== Habitat and ecology ==
Vigna trilobata is mostly found on well-drained, alkaline, dark, cracking clay soils, but also on sandy and loamy soils of similar reaction and can rarely be found on poorly drained soils. One of its major features is its strong resistance to drought, though the seeds shatter in frost. It is also moderately tolerant of salinity. Under well-watered conditions, flowering and seed set is continuous but sparse. However, under moisture stress, plants respond with more dense flowering, far greater seed production and a reduction in vegetative growth. The annual rainfall at areas where Vigna trilobata grows ranges from 700–900 mm (28–35 in). The species is native to a largely tropical area extending from 24ºN in India to 9ºS in Indonesia, and from near sea level to greater than 700 m (2,300 ft) above sea level, mostly equating to average annual temperatures around 25–27 °C (77–81 °F). It is tolerant of regular or constant heavy grazing, but not of infrequent heavy grazing when a bulk of foliage is rapidly removed.

== Uses ==
Vigna trilobata is cultivated in India, Pakistan, and Sudan for short-term pasturage. It is valued highly as it is very tolerant of grazing and is very palatable, even being a human food alternative. However, it tends to have a very low yield.
