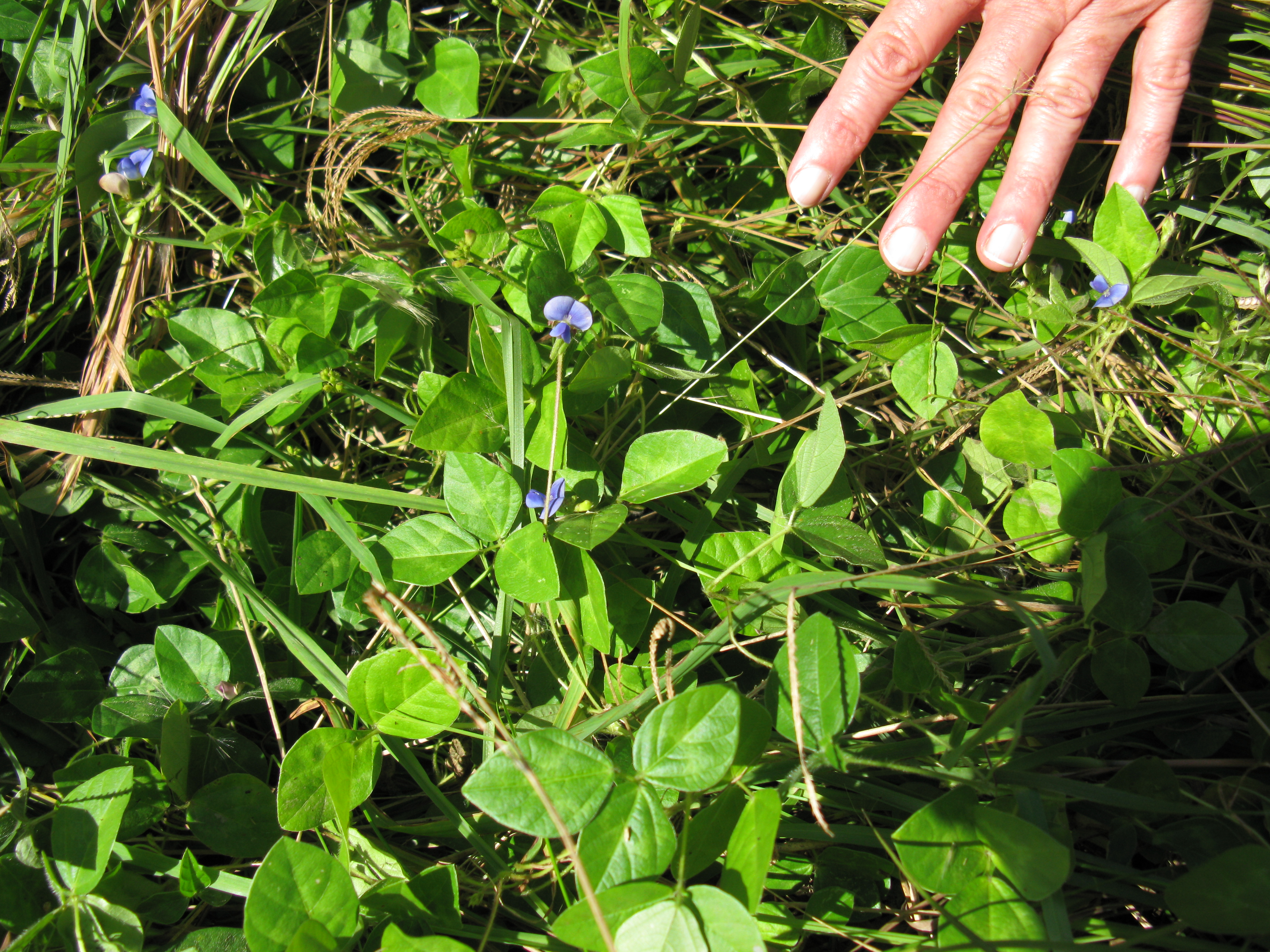
- Vigna parkeri plant

Scientific classification
- Kingdom: Plantae
- Clade: Tracheophytes
- Clade: Angiosperms
- Clade: Eudicots
- Clade: Rosids
- Order: Fabales
- Family: Fabaceae
- Subfamily: Faboideae
- Genus: Vigna
- Species: V. parkeri

Binomial name
- Vigna parkeri Baker

Synonyms
- Dolichos maranguënsis Taub.; Vigna gracilis (Guill. and Perr.) Hook.; Vigna maranguënsis (Taub.) Harms.

= Vigna parkeri =

Species of legume

Vigna parkeri, the creeping vigna or vigna menjalar, is a climbing or prostrate perennial vine that grows in subtropical areas such as Kenya, Indonesia, and Madagascar.

== Description ==
Vigna parkeri has climbing or prostrate stems, sometimes forming mats measuring 0.1–2 m (3.9 in – 6 ft 6.7 in) long. The main rootstock is slender but tough. The stems are thin and often root at the nodes, and are sparsely to densely covered with mostly spreading hairs. There are three leaflets that are round, ovate, or ovate to lanceolate and are 1–8.8 cm (0.39–3.46 in) by 0.8–5.4 cm (0.31–2.13 in). The leaflets are rounded to acuminate at their apex and rounded to acute at their base, as well as pubescent on both sides with densely ciliate margins. The petiole is 1–8.5 cm (0.39–3.35 in) long, and there are two petiolules, approximately 3.5 mm (0.14 in) long.

It has two to five inflorescences that are sometimes 10-flowered. The peduncle is 2–13 cm (0.79–5.12 in) long and the pedicels are 1–3 mm (0.039–0.118 in) long. The calyx is sparsely pubescent, with the tube being 1.5–2 mm (0.059–0.079 in) long, the lobes being deltoid, ovate, or lanceolate, 1–1.5 mm (0.039–0.059 in) long, with the upper pair joined to form a somewhat rounded lobe. The standard is blue, purple-blue, yellow, or white, and is usually paler at the base. The standard is oblate as well, 5–8.5 mm (0.20–0.33 in) by 5–8 cm (2.0–3.1 in), and glabrous. The wings are blue, purple, or yellow. The keel is greenish with a purple tip or yellowish, and the beak is not curved inwards. The pods are linear and oblong, and are 4.5–5.5 cm (1.8–2.2 in) long, and 1.3–2 cm (0.51–0.79 in) wide. The pods are pubescent or glabrous as well, and have two to five seeds. The oblong seeds are grey to brown with black mottling, and are 3–4 mm (0.12–0.16 in) by 2–3 mm (0.079–0.118 in) and 2 mm (0.079 in) thick.

== Habitat and ecology ==
Vigna parkeri occurs in subtropical areas such as the Democratic Republic of Congo, Ethiopia, Rwanda, Uganda, Mozambique, Madagascar, Tanzania, and Kenya and is extremely common in East Africa. It is found in grasslands, grasslands with scattered trees, thickets, forests, pathways, and sometimes as a weed in cultivation. It generally grows from 1,000–2,460 m (3,280–8,070 ft) in elevation and sometimes as high as 2,700 m (8,900 ft).

In native and naturalised situations, it occurs on soils with textures ranging from sands to medium clays with a pH from 4.5 to 6.0, though it has difficulty establishing if the pH is outside the range of 5.4 to 5.8. These soils often have at least moderate levels of soluble aluminium. It occurs in areas with upwards of 2,000 mm (79 in), and is tolerant of flooding. It is best adapted to areas in the upland tropics and lowland subtropics with an average annual temperature between 17–21 °C (63–70 °F). Growth slows during the heat of summer in the subtropics, and the best growth is produced during moist periods in spring and autumn. The top growth is killed even by light frosts, but regenerates readily from surviving rootstocks and stolons with the onset of warm conditions. It is adapted to both heavy and lenient grazing by due to its stolons and twining laterals.
