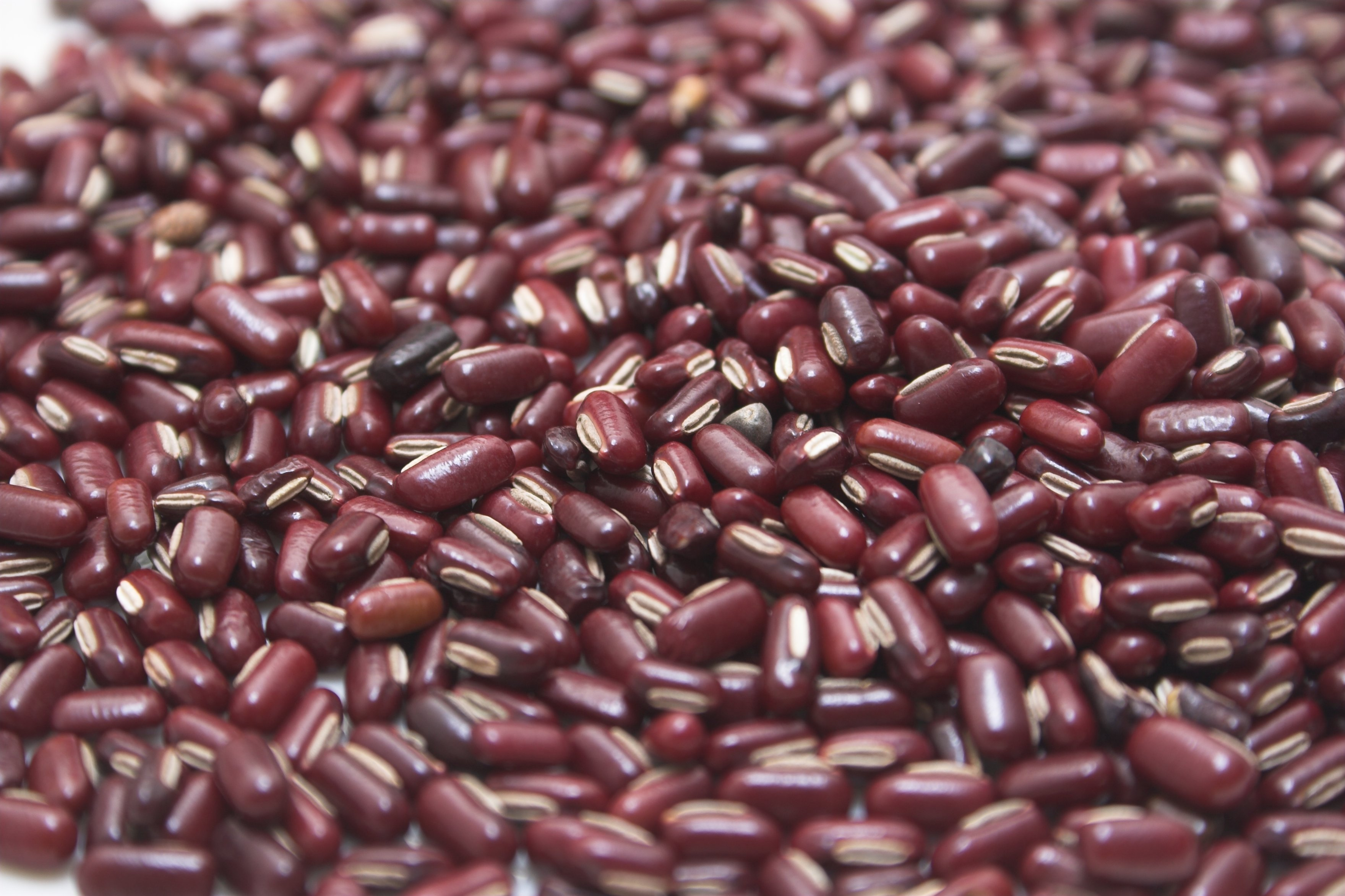
- Harvested Vigna umbellata beans

Scientific classification
- Kingdom: Plantae
- Clade: Tracheophytes
- Clade: Angiosperms
- Clade: Eudicots
- Clade: Rosids
- Order: Fabales
- Family: Fabaceae
- Subfamily: Faboideae
- Genus: Vigna
- Species: V. umbellata

Binomial name
- Vigna umbellata (Thunb.) Ohwi & H. Ohashi

= Vigna umbellata =

Rice bean

Species of flowering plant

Vigna umbellata, previously Phaseolus calcaratus, is a warm-season annual vine legume with yellow flowers and small edible beans. It is commonly called ricebean or rice bean. To date, it is little known, little researched, and little exploited. It is regarded as a minor food and fodder crop and is often grown as intercrop or mixed crop with maize (Zea mays), sorghum (Sorghum bicolor) or cowpea (V. unguiculata), as well as a sole crop in the uplands, on a very limited area. Like the other Asiatic Vigna species, ricebean is a fairly short-lived warm-season annual. Grown mainly as a dried pulse, it is also important as a fodder, a green manure and a vegetable. Ricebean is most widely grown as an intercrop, particularly of maize, throughout Indo-China and extending into southern China, India, Nepal and Bangladesh. In the past it was widely grown as lowland crop on residual soil water after the harvest of long-season rice, but it has been displaced to a great extent where shorter duration rice varieties are grown. Ricebean grows well on a range of soils. It establishes rapidly and has the potential to produce large amounts of nutritious animal fodder and high quality grain.

== Taxonomy ==
The cultivated Asiatic Vigna species belong to the sub-genus Ceratotropis, a fairly distinct and homogeneous group, largely restricted to Asia, which has a chromosome number of 2n = 22 (except V. glabrescens, 2n = 44). There are seven cultivated species within the sub-genus, including mung bean or green gram (V. radiata), black gram or urad bean (V. mungo), adzuki bean (V. angularis) and moth bean (V. aconitifolia) as well as a number of wild species. Artificial crosses have been made between V. mungo and V. umbellata to produce improved mung bean varieties (e.g. Singh et al., 2006).

There are three more or less secondary gene pools within the group: ricebean is closer to V. angularis than to the other species, being in the Angulares group (Kaga et al., 1996, Tomooka et al., 2003).

== Origin and distribution ==
Ricebean's distribution pattern indicates great adaptive polymorphism for diverse environments, with its distribution ranging from humid tropical to sub-tropical, to sub-temperate climate. The presumed centre of domestication is Indo-China. It is thought to be derived from the wild form V. umbellata var gracilis, with which it is cross-fertile, and which is distributed from Southern China through the north of Vietnam, Laos and Thailand into Myanmar and India (Tomooka et al., 1991). Studies of the genetic and eco-geographical relationships among the wild relatives of Vigna species were made by Saravanakumar et al. (2001).

== Adaptation and agronomy ==
Rachie & Roberts (1974) classed ricebean as adapted to subhumid regions with 1000–1500 mm precipitation, although they noted that other factors were also involved in adaptation, for example rainfall pattern, moisture distribution, temperature, cloud cover and relative humidity, soil characteristics, pests and diseases. They noted the importance of human needs in assessing adaptation – for example taste, the need for a particular use, or market price. Average yields were between 200 and 300 kg ha^{−1}, although with the potential for 1200 kg ha^{−1}, the crop would grow on a range of soils, and was resistant to pests and diseases. It would mature in as little as 60 days, and although performing well under humid conditions, was also tolerant to drought (NAS 1979) and high temperatures. It is tolerant to some degree of waterlogging, although the young plants appear to be susceptible (de Carvalho & Veira, 1996). Ricebean is also known to be tolerant to acid soils (Dwivedi, 1996). Shattering is a problem in comparison with other grain legumes, and can be particularly serious under conditions of frequent wetting and drying.

Ricebean is a neglected crop, cultivated on small areas by subsistence farmers in hill areas of Nepal, northern and northeastern India, and parts of southeast Asia. It can be grown in diverse conditions and is well known among farmers for its wide adaptation and production even in marginal lands, drought-prone sloping areas, and flat rainfed tars (unirrigated, ancient alluvial river fans). It is mainly grown between 700 and 1300 m asl, although in home gardens it is found from 200 up to 2000 m. Most of the crop currently grown in Nepal is used as food for humans, with a smaller proportion used for fodder and green manuring.

Generally, ricebean is grown as an intercrop with maize, on rice bunds or on the terrace risers, as a sole crop on the uplands or as a mixed crop with maize in the khet (bunded parcels of lands where transplanted rice is grown) land. Under mixed cropping with maize it is usually broadcast some time between sowing maize and that crop's first and second earthing up, so ricebean sowing extends from April–May to June.

Ricebean is valuable for its ability to fix nitrogen in depleted soils and in mixed cropping with local varieties of maize, as well as for its beneficial role in preventing soil erosion. The crop receives almost no inputs, and is grown on residual fertility and moisture and in marginal and exhausted soils. Anecdotal evidence indicates that the area and production of ricebean in Nepal is declining due to the introduction of high yielding maize varieties and increasing use of chemical fertilizers, while consumption is decreasing due to increased availability of more preferred pulses in the local markets. No modern plant breeding has been done and only landraces with low yield potential are grown. These have to compete with other summer legumes such as soybeans (Glycine max), black gram, cowpea, common beans (Phaseolus vulgaris) and horse gram (Mactrotyloma uniflorum). Other production constraints that limit the production of ricebean include small and fragmented land holdings and declining productivity.

== Morphology ==
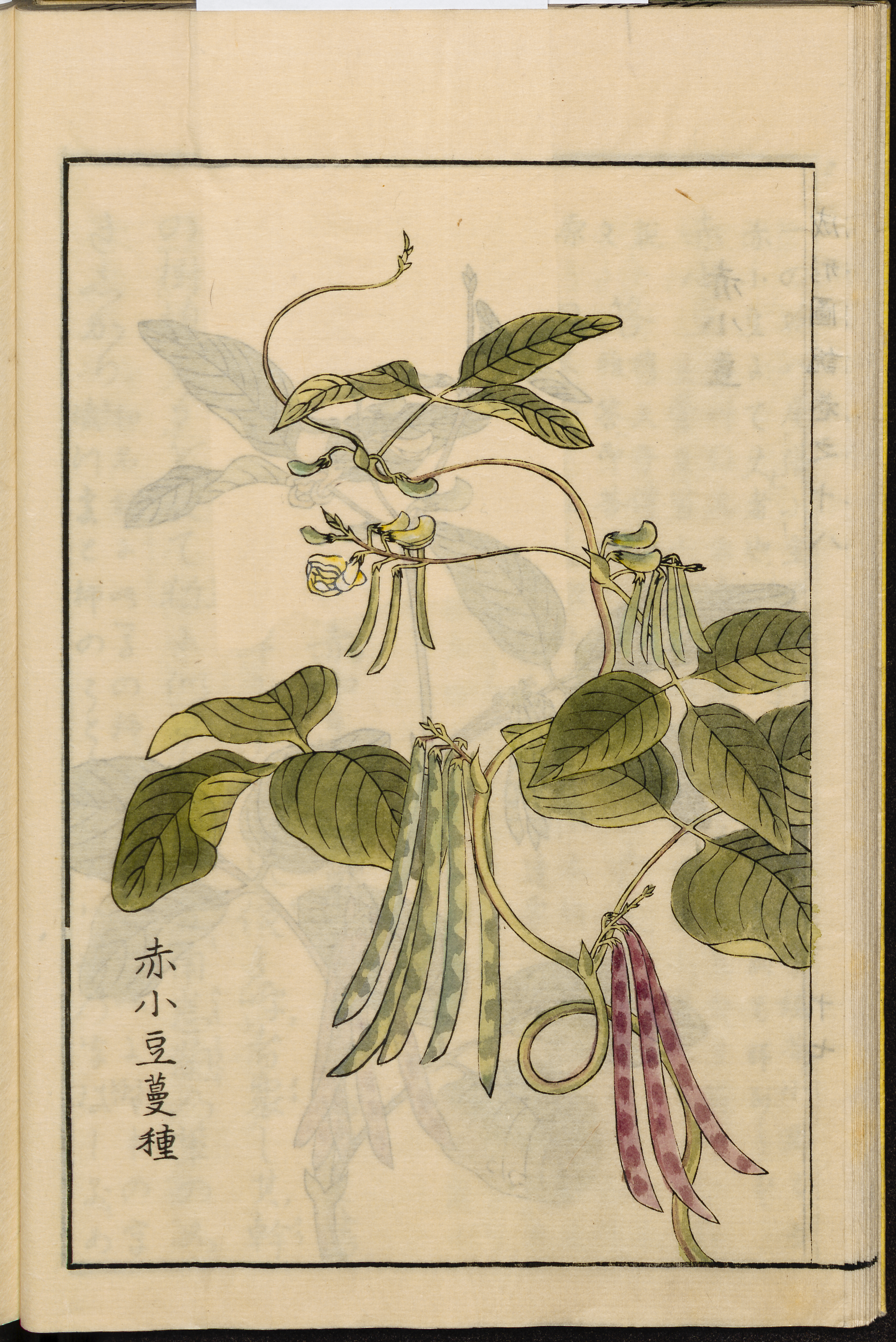
Botanical illustration

Wild forms are typically fine-stemmed, freely-branching and small-leaved, with a twining habit, photoperiod sensitivity and indeterminate growth (Lawn, 1995). Flowering is asynchronous, and there is a tendency to hard seeds. In many areas, landraces which retain many of these characteristics persist, in particular with regard to daylight sensitivity, growth habit and hard seeds. Seed colour is variable, but commonly red or yellow. The red type is commonly named 赤小豆 in Chinese, literally meaning 'red small bean'. It's considered an herb in Traditional Chinese Medicine.

== Germplasm collections ==
The World Vegetable Centre (formerly the Asian Vegetable Research and Development Center) based in Taiwan has 197 accessions of ricebean, including 8 genotypes from Nepal and 24 from India. However, there is little or no passport data (World Vegetable Center, 2007), other than for a Nepalese genotype (given the name Mogimass), collected at 2000 m in Bajura district. The Indian genotypes IC 7588, IC 8229, EC 18771, and IC 7506 are noted as being less sensitive to photoperiod, but no other information is given. In India, the National Bureau of Plant Genetic Resources (NBPGR) contains over 1700 accessions from a variety of Asian countries (NBPGR, 2007). As well as this, there is a collection held at the Indian Institute for Pulses Research, and the NBPGR station at Bhowali, Uttar Pradesh, also maintain a collection of over 300 genotypes (Negi et al., 1996). In Nepal, the Plant Genetic Resources Unit of the NARC maintains a collection of some 300 accessions from various parts of the country.

== Nutritional aspects ==
Ricebean plays an important role in human, animal and soil health improvement. All varieties seem to be good sources of protein, essential amino acids, essential fatty acids and minerals (Mohan & Janardhanan, 1994), and the dried seeds make an excellent addition to a cereal-based diet.

=== Human nutrition ===
Ricebean is most often served as a dal, either soaked overnight and boiled with a few spices, or cooked in a pressure cooker. Apart from various recipes for dal soups and sauces, pulses are also used in a number of other ways, either whole, cooked or roasted, as flour, or ground to make various deep fried dishes or snacks. Some recipes are specific to particular pulses, but many are open to substitution. The consumption of green pods as a vegetable has been recorded but is not widespread, although the indeterminate growth habit of many varieties is beneficial in providing a steady supply of green pods over long periods of the year.

The raw protein content of ricebean is lower than that of most pulses, although there is considerable variation. Gopinathan et al. (1987) note that the protein content of related wild species (e.g. Vigna minima) tends to be higher than of cultivated lines, so there may be potential to breed for improved protein content. However, the amino acid composition is reported by several authors to be well balanced for human consumption (e.g. Chandel et al., 1978; Mohan & Janardhan, 1994; de Carvalho & Vieira, 1996).

As in other pulses, an important problem is that ricebean contains various antinutrients, notably phytic acid or phytate, polyphenols and fibres that reduce micronutrient uptake, in particular iron and zinc. Breeding for low phytate seeds is possible, but there are conflicting opinions about its desirability because phytate is also a human nutrient, and also plays various roles in the life cycle of the plant.

Special concern for flatulence-producing substances is important when a pulse is promoted for human consumption (Smil, 1997). Revilleza et al. (1990) tested the content of known flatulence-producing oligosaccharides in common legumes from the Philippines and ranked them on their flatulence-producing potential: Sam-samping (Clitoria ternatea) > hyacinth bean (Lablab purpureus, syn. Dolichos lablab L) > Lima bean (Phaseolus lunatus) > swordbean (Canavalia gladiata) > ricebean > jack bean (Canavalia ensiformis). Two different varieties of ricebean contained 2.25 and 2.55% oligosaccharides. Kaur & Kawatra (2000) measured the effect of soaking, open pan cooking, pressure cooking, sprouting and combinations of these. All led to a significant reduction of the content of flatus-producing sugars, although the most effective was a combination of sprouting and pressure cooking.

While most legumes contain one or several enzyme inhibitors and similar antinutritive or toxic factors (Smil, 1997), the content of such substances appears to be low in ricebean.

=== Animal nutrition ===
Ricebean is valuable as a high class fodder which is known to increase milk production in livestock.

=== Herbalism ===
The red type of ricebean is used in traditional Chinese medicine, sometimes in combination with Angelica sinensis (當歸). No information is available regarding any “folk medicine” use in Nepal or India.

== Cultural significance ==
In South Asia, the idea of a division of foods into hot, cold and neutral is very common. This has an important bearing on dietary choices, as this perception not only promotes a balance between hot and cold food stuffs in daily nutrition, but also encourages or discourages the consumption of various items according to season, and during sickness. An account of the perception of a number of food items in Nepal has been published by Gittelsohn et al. (1997). Their data shows that there is hardly any “scientific” basis for the division into hot and cold foods. For instance, yogurt is cold while goat milk is hot, buffalo meat is cold while fish and chicken is hot, and black gram is cold while red gram (cowpea) is hot. This perception tends to be location-specific, so these findings cannot be generalised all over Nepal (or South Asia!). Their study did not comment on the hot-cold rating of ricebean.

In Nepal, ricebean tends to be categorised as a cold food (e.g. in Gulmi, Kailali, Syangja, Dang, Gorkha districts) and it is said to cool people in the summer. However, it is also said to make people warm during the winter. In Ilam District in Eastern Nepal, ricebean is considered hot, and there it is advised that old and sick people should not eat it during the hot season, as it is not easily digested and weak people would get stomach problems from eating it.

Another account from Ilam stated that ricebean, although creating some stomach unrest, was milder and more digestible than other pulses, and therefore often served to people who suffer from indigestion. Whether hot or cold, the major share of ricebean is consumed soon after harvest, so the crop will only indirectly impact on food security during the lean season in the pre- and early monsoon period.

Some oral evidence from Nepal says that ricebean does not have a particular ceremonial role. This is in contrast to black gram which is used for ceremonial purposes among high caste Hindus, and also for instance among Rai people in the Arun Valley. In addition, black gram is considered tastier and fetches a higher market price, so will tend to replace ricebean if the farmer has to make a choice.

Quantee (or kwati in Newari) is a mixed bean sprout soup served at the Janai Purnima or Raksha Bhandan festival. Ricebean is one of nine beans prescribed for this recipe. The festival marks the end of the monsoon where people by traditional perception (and probably also in reality) have been weak, undernourished and subject to diseases. In this respect, quantee is said “to make one strong” and to purify the stomach as the mixed bean sprouts are hard to digest and so cleans the stomach. In addition, eating quantee is said to kill a certain type of mosquito (Löwdin, 1998).

While ricebean in Nepal is to some extent perceived as a "poor man's food", it is not particularly stigmatised, so no ethnic or caste group actually has a rule against it. In Dang, ricebean is particularly enjoyed by Tharu (indigenous Terai) people, who have a version of quantee which requires ten different beans.

One source mentioned that since ricebean is supposed to make you strong, people will often serve it to labourers, while also occasionally consuming it themselves in connection with tasks requiring hard work.

== Potential ==
So far little has been done to exploit ricebean's potential: there are several features that need attention from breeders before it could be widely adopted. Most varieties are highly photoperiod sensitive, and so when grown in the subtropics are late flowering and show strong vegetative growth. Their twining habit makes them very suitable for use as intercrops with such species as maize, sorghum and possibly some of the minor millet species, which can provide support, but also makes them difficult to harvest. Many of the current varieties are susceptible to shattering, and show high levels of hard seededness. Some crop improvement work has been carried out on ricebean in India, but not in Nepal. However, the use of ricebean as a green manure crop was studied in a series of field experiments in Nepal, and this revealed that it is one of the best legumes for the purpose due to high biomass production over a short period of time, is easy to incorporate into the soil, and decomposes rapidly.

== Chemistry ==
Catechin-7-O-glucoside can be found in the seed of V. umbellata. In vitro, this compound has an antioxidant activity leading to a cytoprotective effect.
