= Patjuk =

Korean red bean and rice porridge

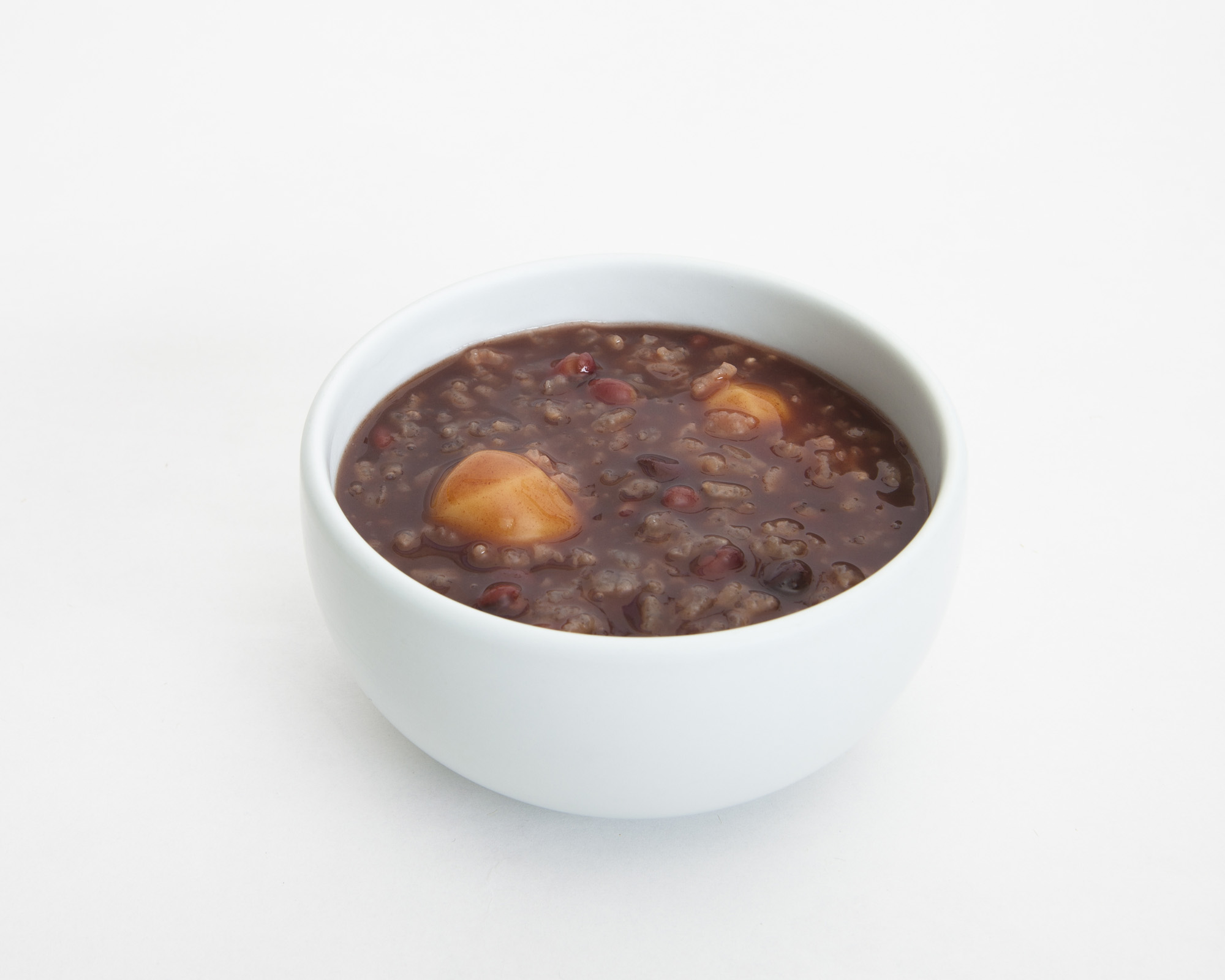
- A bowl of patjuk (red bean porridge) with saealsim (rice cake balls)
- Alternative names: red bean porridge
- Type: Juk
- Place of origin: Korea
- Region or state: East Asia
- Associated cuisine: Korean cuisine
- Main ingredients: Red beans, rice
- Food energy (per 1 serving): 58 kcal (240 kJ)
- Similar dishes: Hóngdòu tāng, shiruko

Korean name
- Hangul: 팥죽
- RR: patjuk
- MR: p'atchuk
- IPA: [pʰat̚.t͈ɕuk̚]

Patjuk (Korean: 팥죽; pronounced [pʰat̚.t͈ɕuk̚]) is a type of Korean juk consisting of red beans and rice. It is commonly eaten during the winter season in Korea, and it is associated with dongji (winter solstice), as people used to believe that the red color of patjuk drives off baneful spirits.

== Preparation ==
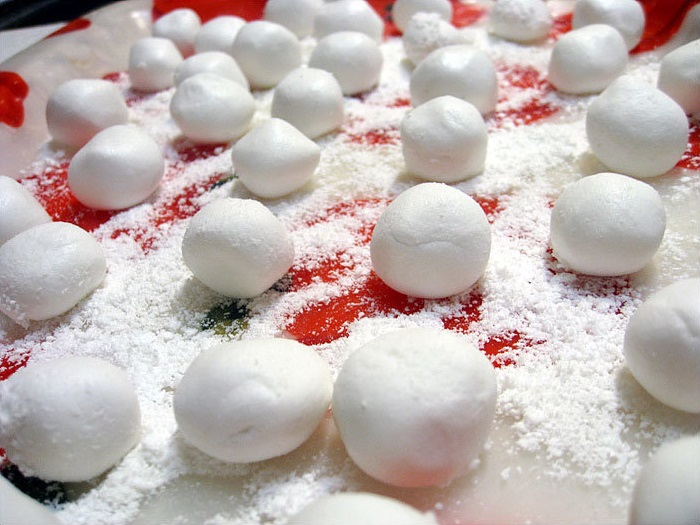
Saeal-sim (bird's eggs) made with rice flour and hot water

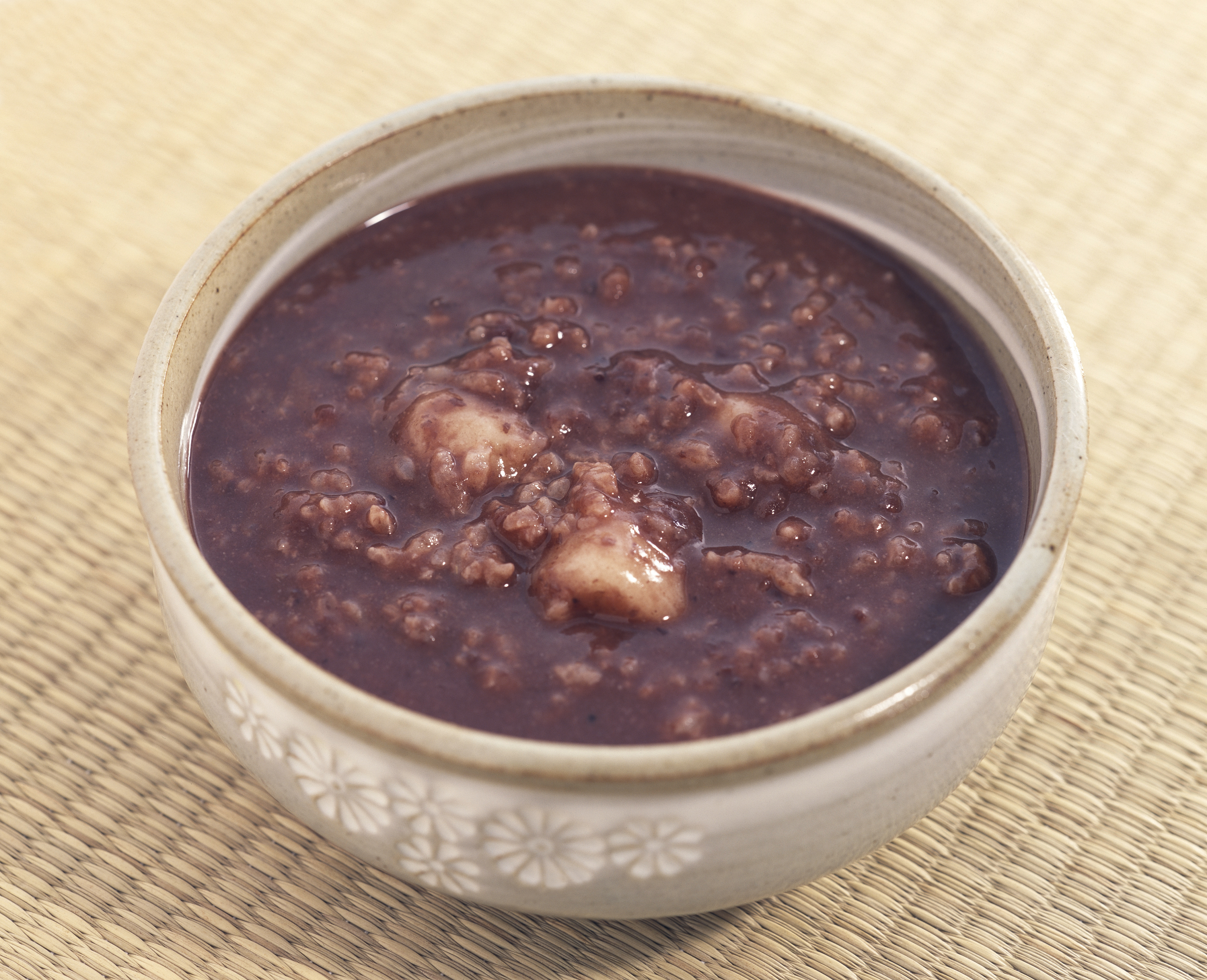

Dried red beans are boiled with eight to ten parts water until fully cooked and soft, then mashed and passed through a sieve. The bean skins are discarded, and the remaining beans sit for some time in order for them to separate into layers. The upper layer consisting of clear water is used to boil rice, while the lower layer consisting of settled red bean mash is kept. When the rice is cooked, the mashed beans are added back into the porridge along with saeal-sim (새알심; literally "bird's egg", named as such due to its resemblance to small bird's eggs, possibly quail eggs), which are the small rice cake balls made of glutinous rice flour. The number of saealsim added is often the same number as the eater's age. Salt is then added to taste.

== Varieties ==
- Patjuk is often eaten as a meal rather than as a dessert, and by default is not sweetened. Saealsim (새알심; "bird's egg"), small rice cake balls made of glutinous rice flour, are often added to the dish.
- Dan-patjuk (단팥죽; "sweet red bean porridge") is a sweetened dessert porridge made of boiled and mashed red beans. Glutinous rice powder instead of rice grains is added to the porridge, and the porridge is sweetened with honey or sugar. Saealsim is often added to dan-patjuk.
- Pat-kal-guksu (팥칼국수; "red bean noodles") is a type of kal-guksu (noodle soup with knife-cut wheat noodles). In the dish, noodles replace the usual rice and saealsim.

== Folklore and traditions ==
Patjuk is commonly eaten during the winter season, and is associated with dongji (winter solstice), the day with the shortest period of daylight and the longest night of the year.

Cooking and eating patjuk was also a ritual to prevent bad luck, epidemic disease, and influences from malevolent spirits. People believed that the red color of patjuk drives off baneful spirits, as red was a symbolic color of positive energy which can keep negative energy at bay. According to the story, a man named Gong Gong had a bad son who died on the day of winter solstice and became a disease-spreading evil spirit who was afraid of red bean porridge. People began to make red bean porridge on winter solstice to ward off the spirit, and forestall epidemic diseases. Before eating patjuk, Koreans used to offer it to various household deities such as kitchen god. Patjuk used to be smeared on walls or doors, or placed in a bowl in each room of the house.

The custom of eating patjuk in winter is also related to Korea's long history as an agrarian society. Having a rich harvest has always been a pivotal issue for people, and eating patjuk became a ritual to wish for abundant harvests. By fully relaxing and eating nourishing food in winter, people wanted to be prepared to start farming in the spring. As winter was often the time of rice shortage, the staple in Korean cuisine, patjuk made of red beans, water, and relatively smaller amount of rice was an economical food. The dish also requires no extra side dishes to constitute a complete meal. Patjuk embodies a custom of conserving food.

Although the beliefs on red color and malevolent spirits as well as the agrarian traditions have faded in modern, industrialized society, patjuk is still enjoyed as a seasonal dish in Korea.

== Gallery ==
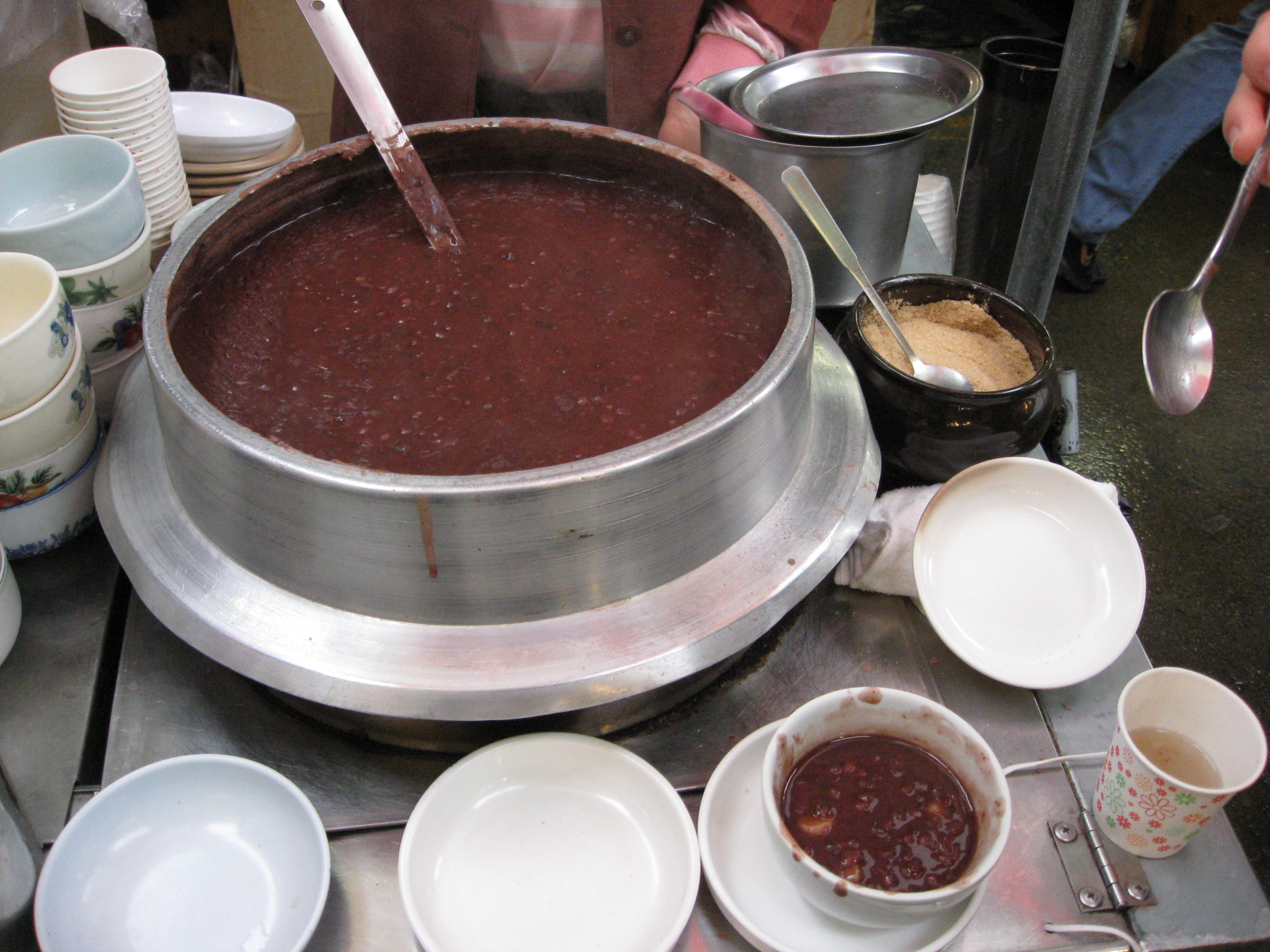
Patjuk sold by a street vendor in Busan, South Korea

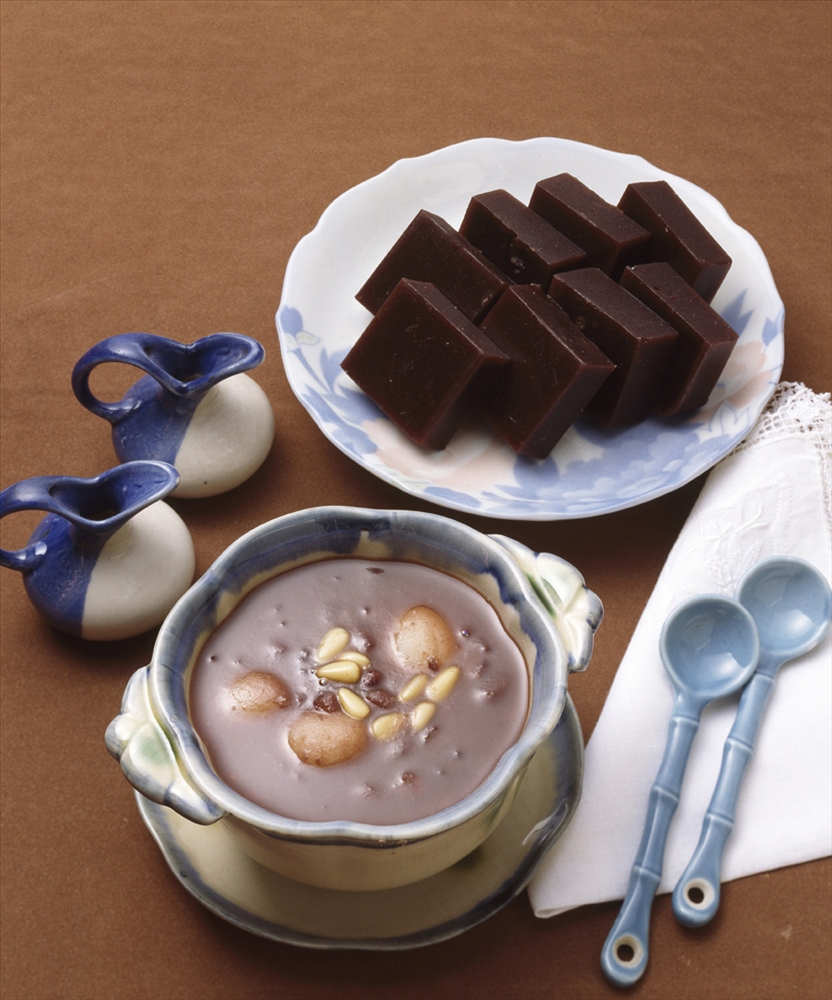
Patjuk garnished with various nuts

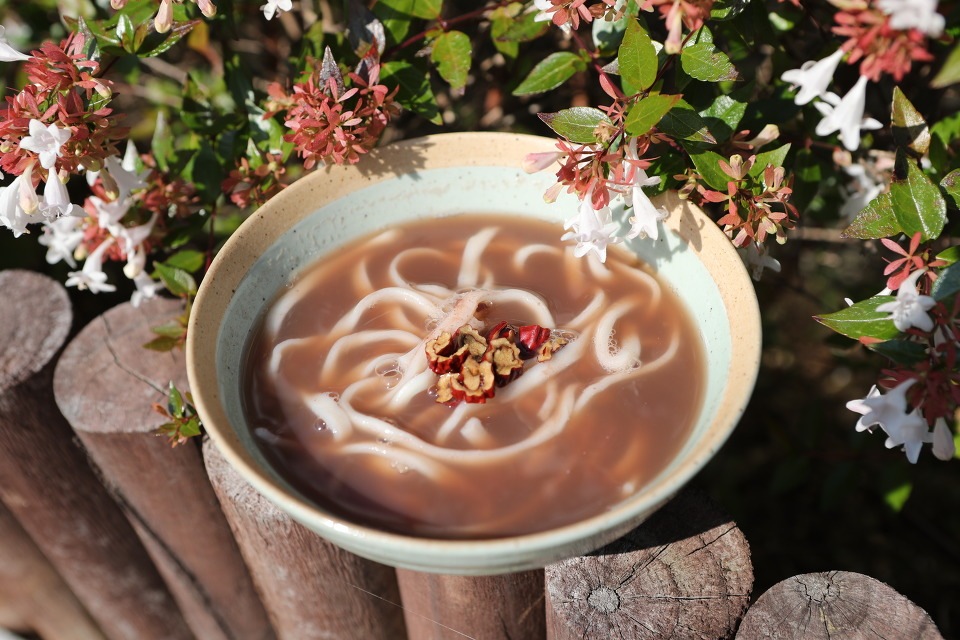
Pat-kal-guksu, a noodle soup

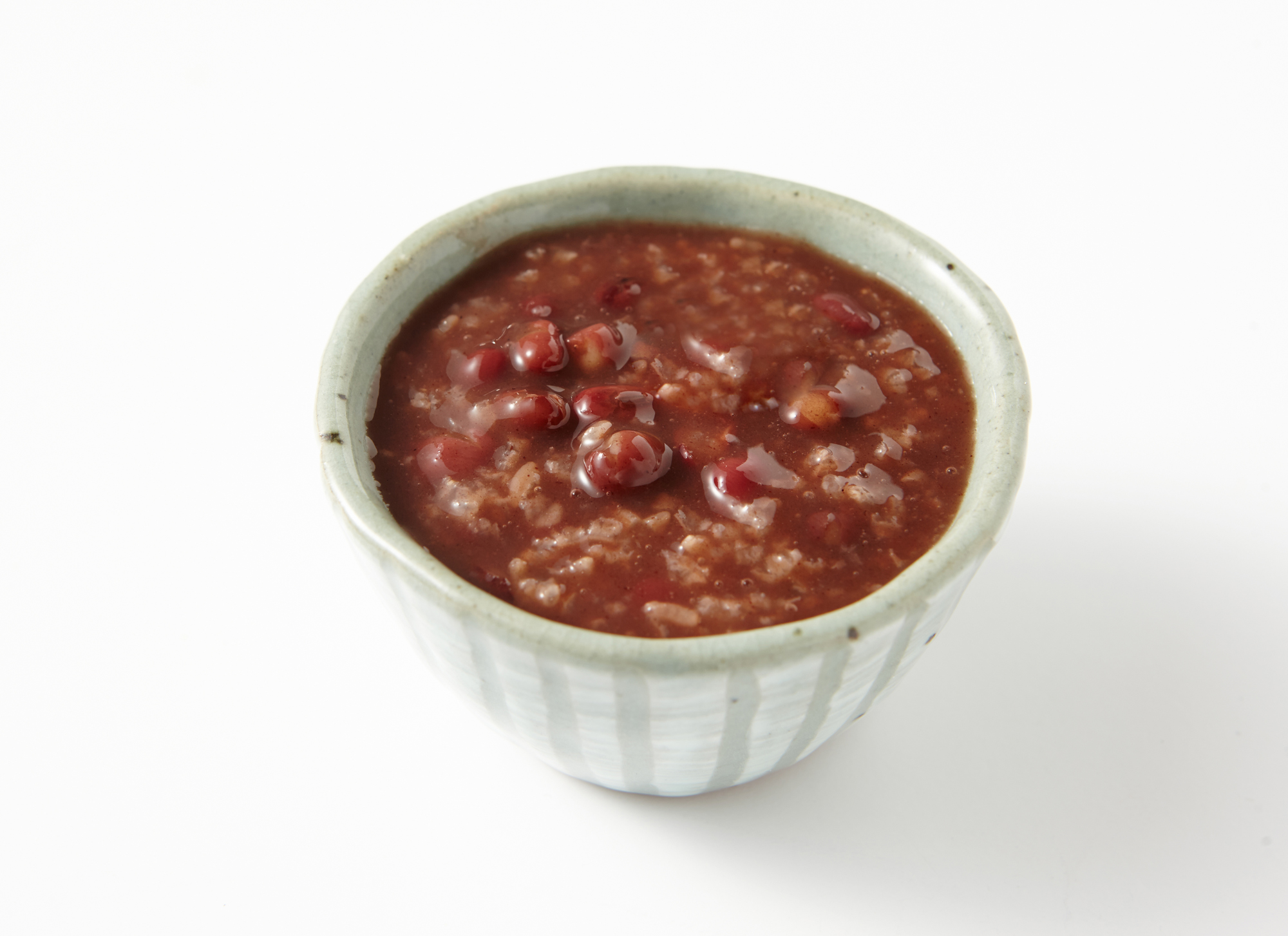

== See also ==
- Patbap – red bean rice
- Hong dou tang
- Shiruko
