= Shiruko =

Japanese dessert

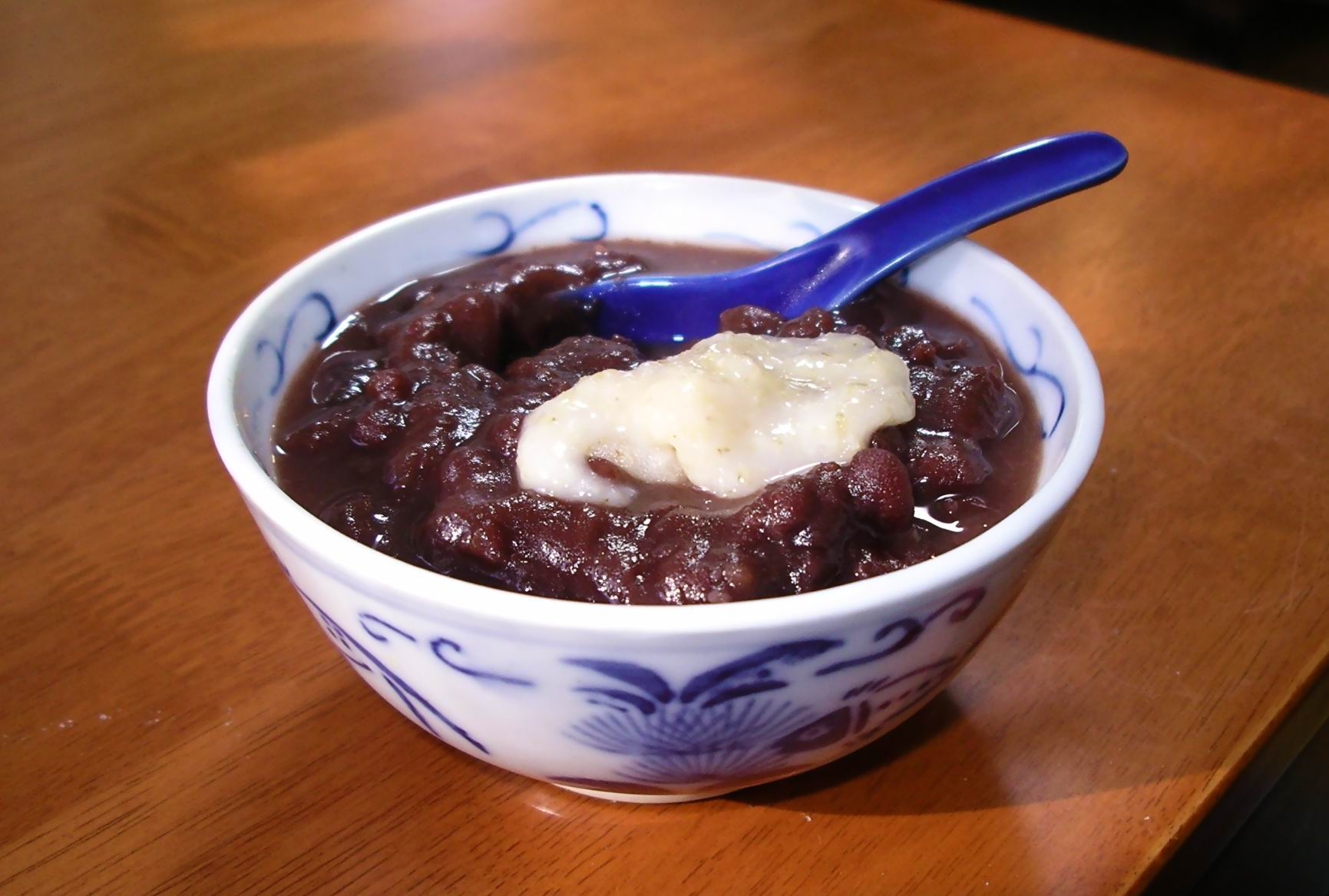
- Shiruko with genmai mochi
- Course: Dessert
- Place of origin: Japan
- Serving temperature: Hot, cold
- Main ingredients: Azuki beans, mochi, sugar
- Similar dishes: Zenzai, hong dou tang, patjuk

Shiruko (汁粉), or oshiruko (お汁粉) with the honorific o (お), is a traditional Japanese dessert. It is a sweet porridge of azuki beans boiled and crushed, served in a bowl with mochi. There are different styles of shiruko, such as shiruko with candied chestnuts, or with glutinous rice flour dumplings instead of mochi.

The half-melted sticky mochi and the sweet, warm red bean porridge is enjoyed by many Japanese, especially during the winter. Shiruko is frequently served with a side dish of something sour or salty, such as umeboshi or shiokombu, to refresh the palate as shiruko is so sweet that the taste may cloy after a while.

== Types ==
There are two types of shiruko based on different methods of cooking azuki beans. Azuki beans may be turned into paste, crushed without keeping their original shape, or a mix of paste and roughly crushed beans.

There is a similar dish, zenzai (善哉/ぜんざい), which is made from condensed paste with heat and is less watery than shiruko, like making jam or marmalade. In Western Japan, zenzai refers to a type of shiruko made from a mixture of paste and crushed beans. In Okinawa, the term zenzai commonly refers to this bean soup served over shaved ice with mochi. Other toppings, such as sweetened condensed milk, are occasionally added for flavor.

In Tottori Prefecture and Shimane Prefecture, shiruko is also used for zōni, the special soup for New Year celebration.

== Gallery ==
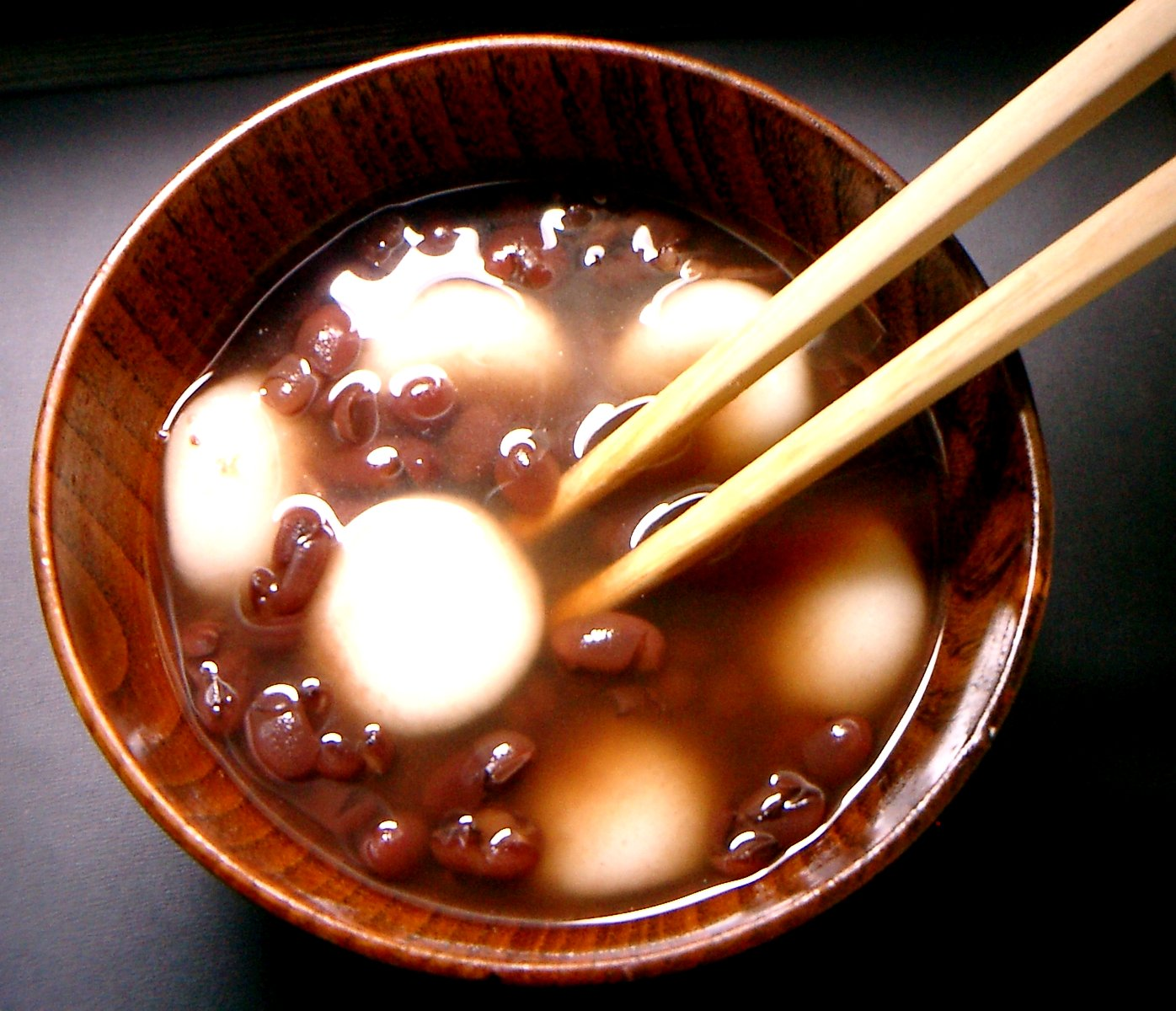

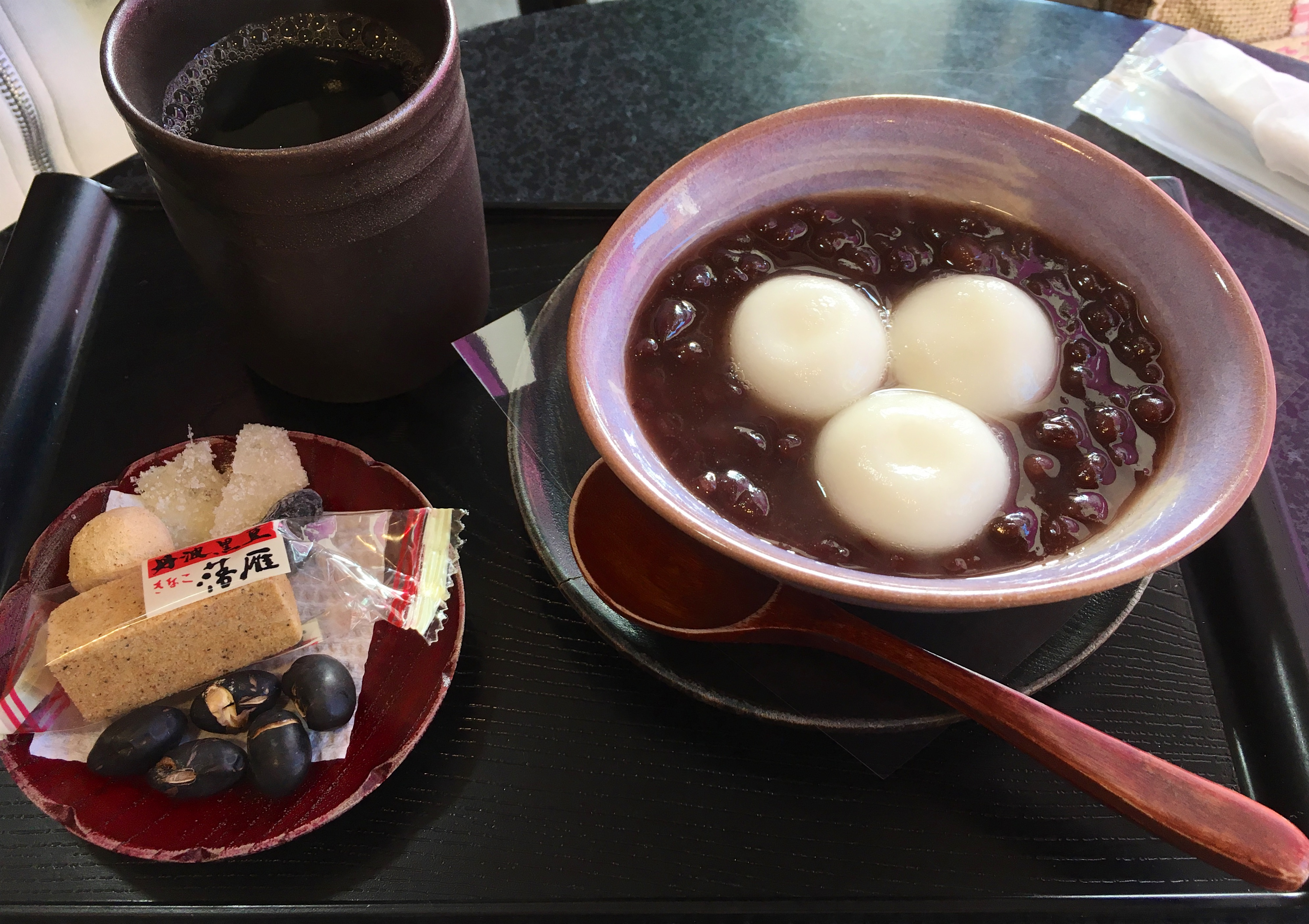

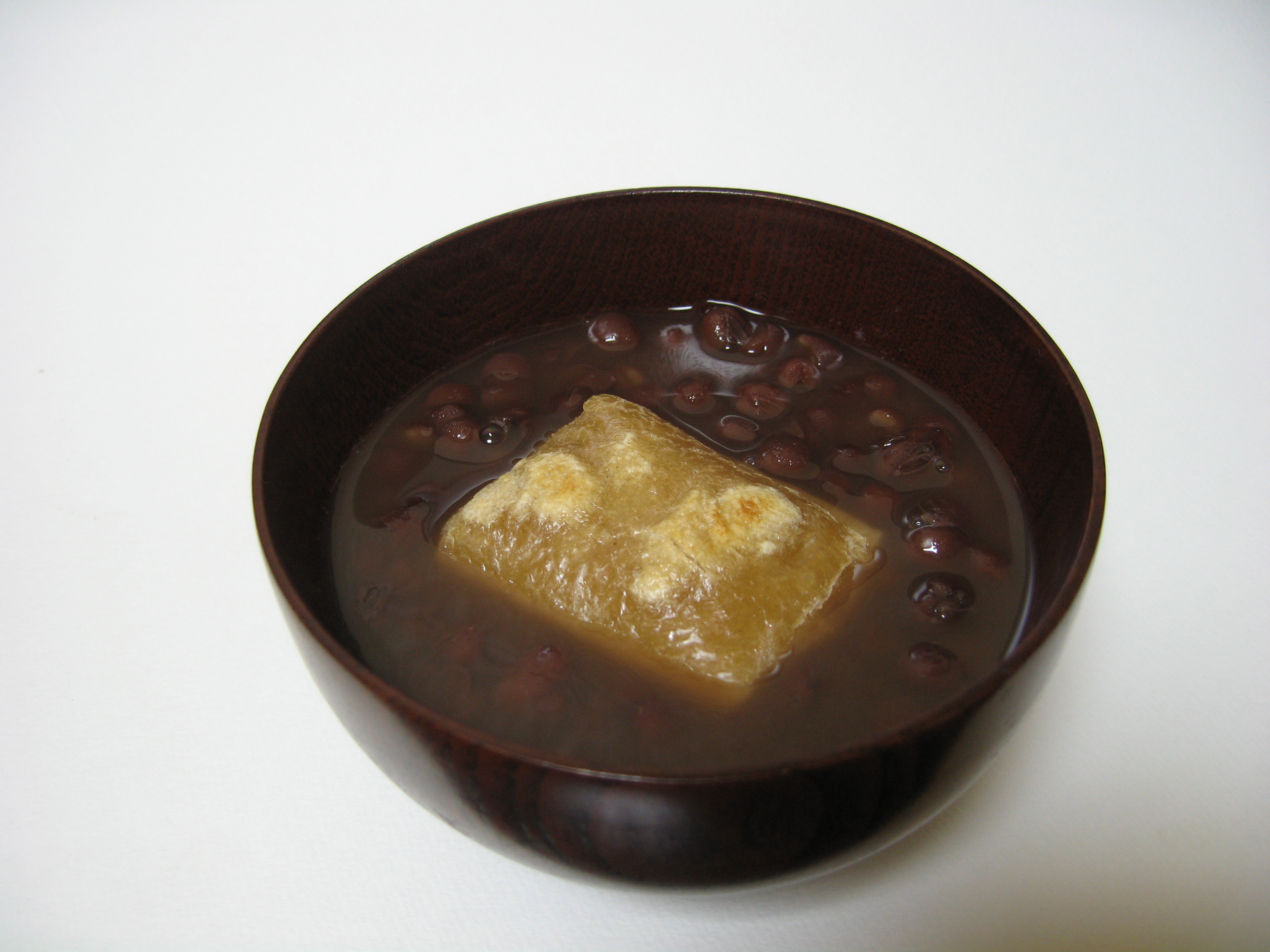

== See also ==
- Hong dou tang
- Patjuk
