= Red bean rice =

Rice cooked with red beans

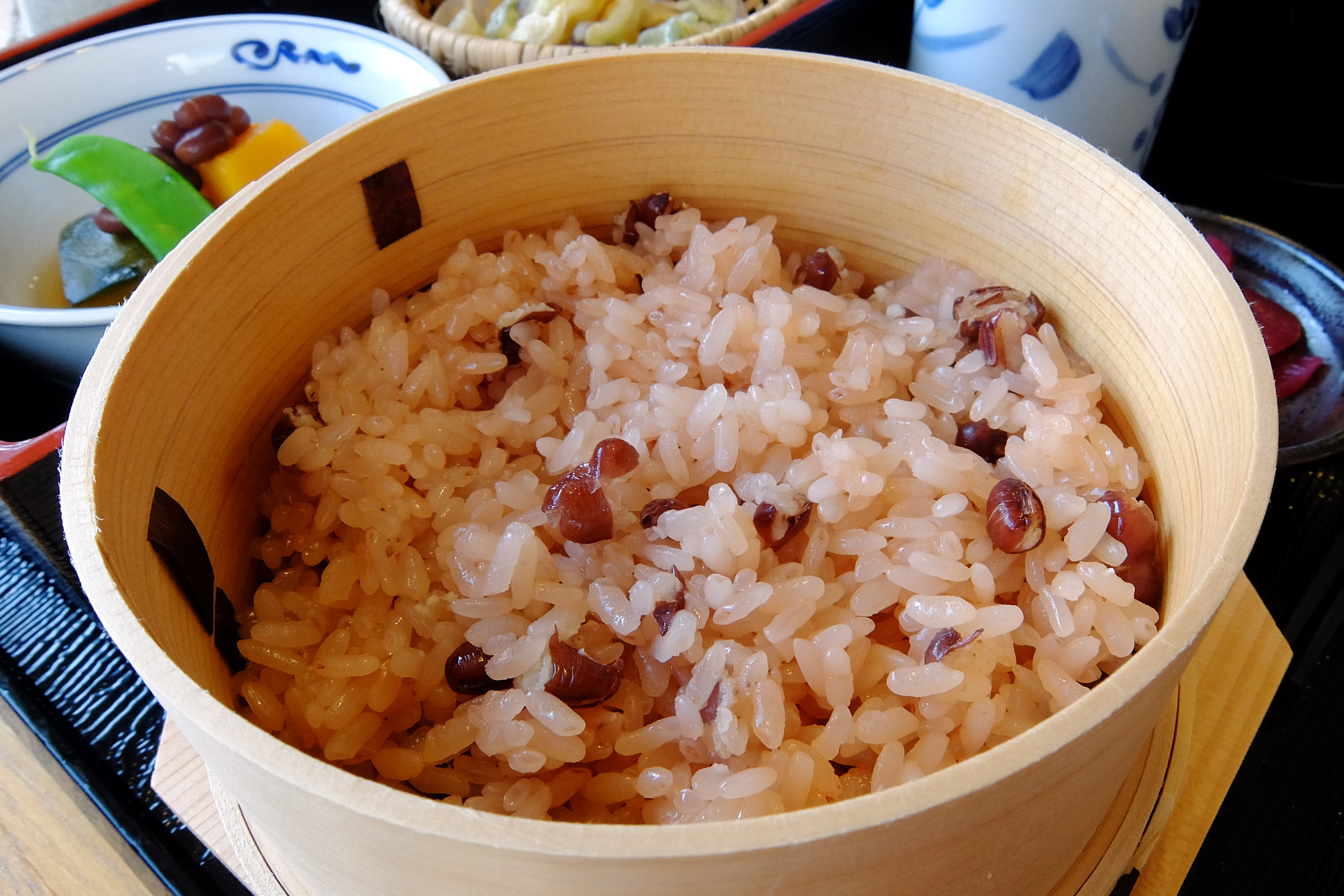
- Region or state: East Asia
- Associated cuisine: Chinese; Japanese; Korean
- Main ingredients: Rice, adzuki beans
- Similar dishes: Kongbap

Red bean rice, called patbap (팥밥) in Korean, sekihan (赤飯) in Japanese, and hóngdòu fàn (红豆饭) in Chinese, is an East Asian rice dish consisting of rice cooked with red beans.

== East Asian varieties ==
=== China ===
Hóngdòu fàn (红豆饭) is a traditional Chinese dish found in some regions of China. It is particularly common in Jiangsu province and eaten during the Winter Clothes Day. A legend from the Dafeng area of Yancheng, Jiangsu says that people eat a bowl of glutinous rice mixed with red beans on the Winter Clothes Day in Jiangsu to commemorate a shepherd boy who was slain by a landlord. It is said that a long time ago, an adorable shepherd boy was born into a poor family. His parents could not support him, so he made a living by shepherding for a landlord. One day, his carelessness in tending to the sheep resulted in those sheep falling into a valley and dying. After hearing the news, the landlord was extremely angry. Consequently, he beat and scolded the shepherd boy. The shepherd boy begged for the landlord to stop the relentless beating but he did not. When the shepherd boy believed that he would die from the beatings, he fought against the landlord, but the landlord picked up a knife next to him and killed the boy. The blood of the shepherd boy stained the glutinous rice on the ground red. Coincidentally, that day was 1 October.

In 2015, red bean rice was served to Prime Minister of India, Narendra Modi at a state banquet with General Secretary of the Chinese Communist Party, Xi Jinping in Xi'an, Shaanxi province.

=== Japan ===
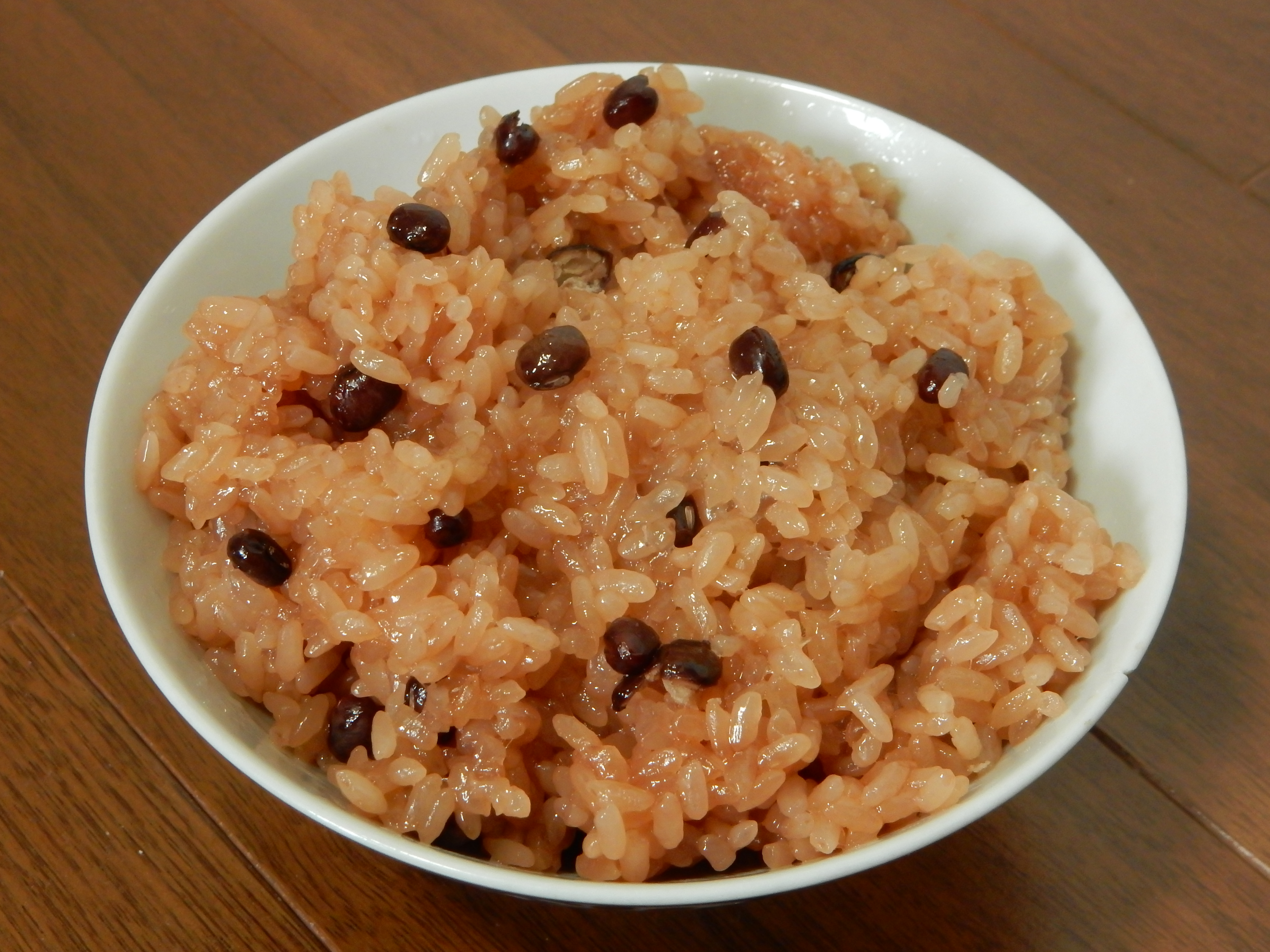
Sekihan

Sekihan (赤飯, lit. 'red rice', rice boiled together with red beans) is a Japanese traditional dish. It is sticky rice steamed with adzuki beans, which give a reddish color to the rice, hence its name.

The rice of ancient times of Japan was red. Therefore, red rice was used in Shinto divine work. Red rice has a strong taste of tannin, and its cultivation has been almost completely abandoned.

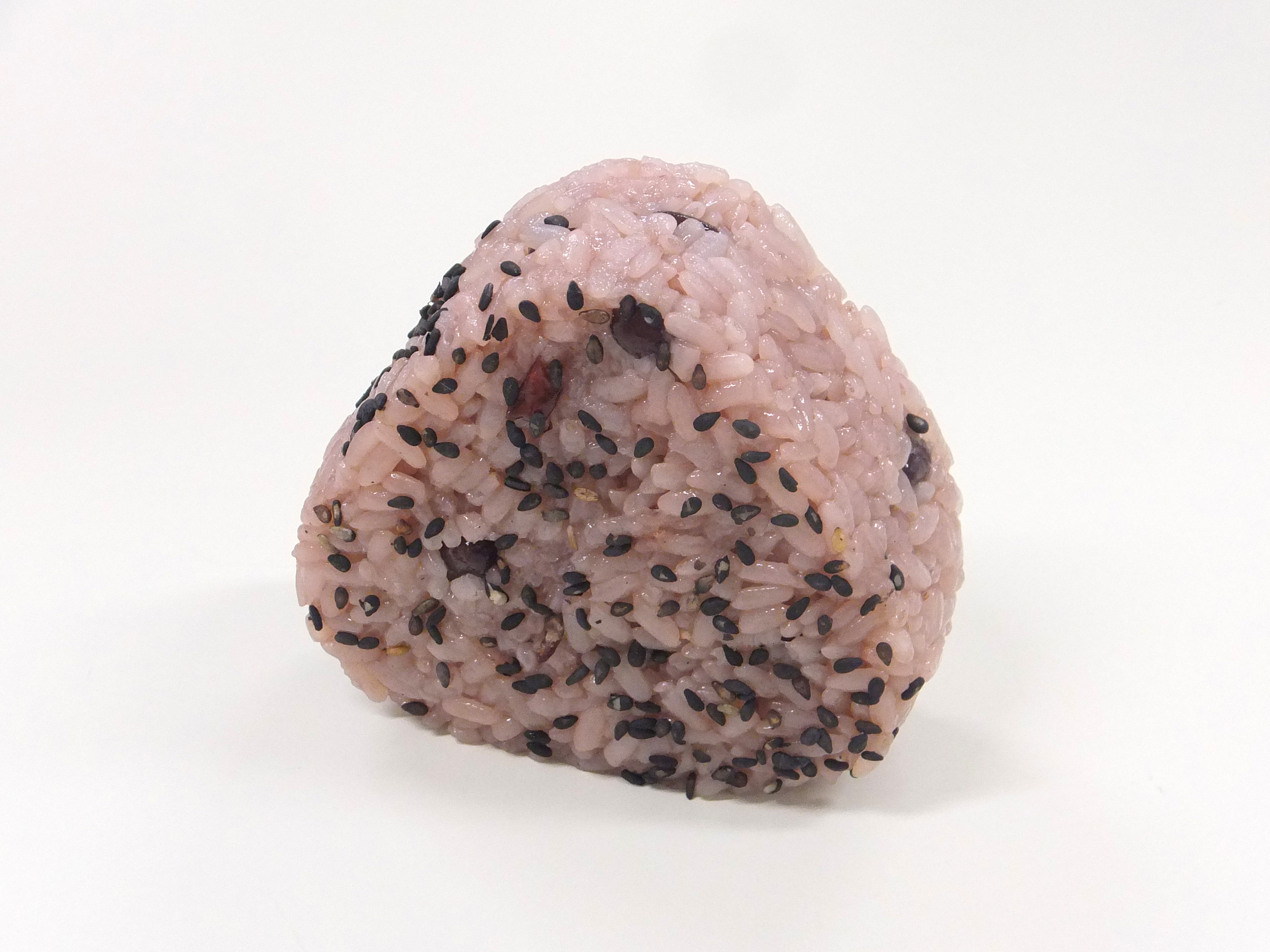
Onigiri made with sekihan

Sekihan is often served on special occasions throughout the year in Japan, for example, birthdays, weddings and some holidays, such as Shichi-Go-San. In some places it is customarily made when a young woman reaches menarche, although this is less common now than it was in the past.

Sekihan is so strongly connected with celebrations that the phrase "Let's have sekihan" has acquired the meaning "Let's celebrate". It is believed that sekihan is used for celebrations because of its red color, symbolizing happiness in Japan.

It is usually eaten immediately after cooking but it may also be eaten at room temperature, as in a celebratory bento (boxed lunch). Sekihan is traditionally eaten with gomashio (a mixture of lightly toasted sesame and salt).

There are also regional varieties of sekihan. Some versions call for sugar instead of salt to give a sweet flavor. Others use amanattō (sweetened bean confectionery) or sasage (black cowpea beans) instead of adzuki.

=== Korea ===
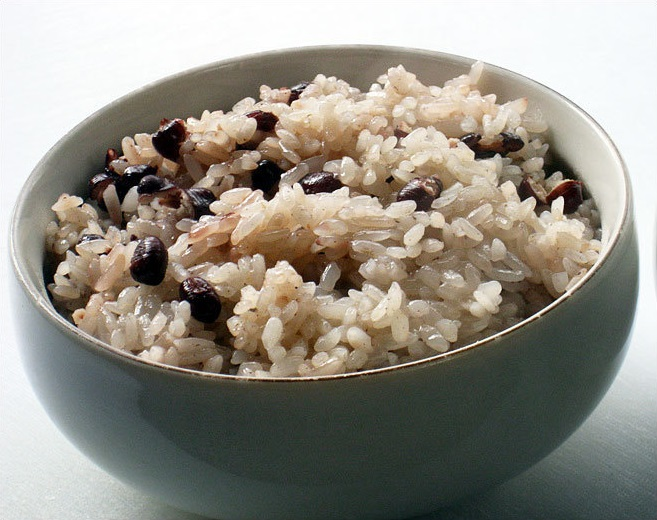
Patbap

Patbap (Korean: 팥밥; pronounced [pʰat̚.p͈ap̚]; lit. 'red bean rice') is a bap (cooked grain dish) made with non-glutinous white short-grain rice and adzuki beans. Patbap has been mentioned in the documents such as Joseon Mussangsinsik Yorijaebeop (Korean: 조선무쌍신식요리제법; Hanja: 朝鮮無雙新式料理製法), the early cookbook that compiled the information how to make the traditional dishes of Joseon. It is especially a traditional recipe of Pyongan Province, where adzuki beans are grown in abundance. In Korean culture, it is usually eaten in the winter months, but it is also prepared for holidays and birthdays. For that reason it is sometimes referred to as "birthday rice".

Patbap is typically made in the same way as making huinbap (cooked white rice), with the additional step of mixing cooked whole adzuki beans with soaked white rice before boiling. Fresh, undried beans can be used without boiling in advance. Four parts rice and one part adzuki beans may be used, but the amount of adzuki beans can be adjusted to taste. In some regions, uncooked red or black adzuki beans are husked and ground before being mixed with soaked rice. In Korean royal court cuisine, rice was cooked in the water where adzuki beans were boiled.

- Patbap (팥밥) – Adzuki beans are boiled with 6–7 parts water until cooked but intact. They are then mixed with soaked rice, and boiled again in water. Usually, plain water mixed with the water in which the beans were boiled is used.
- Budungpat-bap (부둥팥밥) – Budung-pat means fresh (rather than dried) beans. Ripe fresh adzuki beans are mixed with soaked rice and boiled. Less water is used than with dried beans as the fresh beans contain moisture.
- Geopipat-bap (거피팥밥) – Geopi-pat means husked beans. Red or black adzuki beans are husked, ground using a millstone, and mixed with soaked rice. Husked adzuki beans are an ivory white color.
- Jungdung-bap (중둥밥) – Whole adzuki beans are boiled in water and sieved, so that the water can be used to make reddish rice. The sieved red beans can be sweetened and used in desserts. If barley is also mixed in, the dish is called pat-bori-bap (팥보리밥; "adzuki bean and barley rice"). In Kangwon Province, a dish made with corn kernels (in place of rice) and adzuki beans is called oksusu-pat-bap (옥수수팥밥; "corn and adzuki bean rice").

== See also ==
- Kongbap – similar Korean dish made with soybeans
- Patjuk – red bean porridge
- Red bean cake – similar Japanese rice cake made with red beans
- Red beans and rice
