= Hong dou tang =

Chinese sweet dessert soup

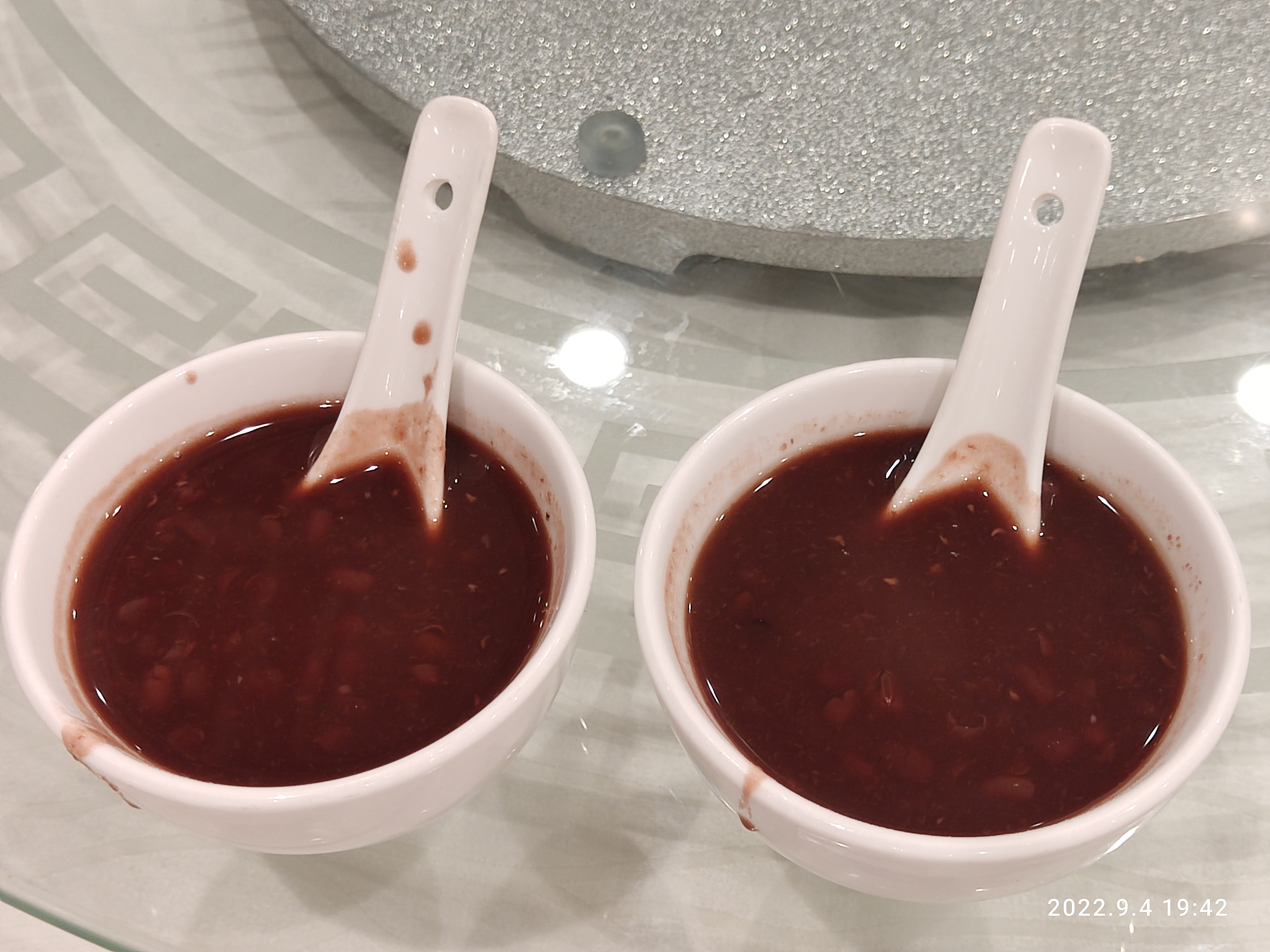
- Bowls of hóngdòutāng, Chinese red bean soup
- Type: Tong sui, dessert soup
- Course: Dessert
- Place of origin: China
- Region or state: East Asia
- Associated cuisine: Chinese cuisine Cantonese cuisine
- Serving temperature: Hot, cold
- Main ingredients: Adzuki beans, sugar
- Similar dishes: Patjuk, shiruko

Hong dou tang
- Traditional Chinese: 紅豆湯
- Simplified Chinese: 红豆汤
- Literal meaning: red bean soup
Transcriptions
Standard Mandarin
- Hanyu Pinyin: hóngdòu tāng
Yue: Cantonese
- Jyutping: hung4 dau6 tong1

Alternative Chinese name
- Traditional Chinese: 紅豆沙
- Simplified Chinese: 红豆沙
- Literal meaning: red bean sand
Transcriptions
Standard Mandarin
- Hanyu Pinyin: hóngdòu shā
Yue: Cantonese
- Jyutping: hung4 dau6 sha1

Hong dou tang (紅豆湯), hong dou sha (紅豆沙), or red bean soup is a sweet Chinese dessert soup made from azuki beans. It is served in mainland China, Taiwan, Hong Kong, Macau, and places with Chinese diaspora. It is categorized as a tong sui, or sweet soup. It is often served cold during the summer, and hot in the winter. Leftover red bean soup can also be frozen to make ice pops and is a popular dessert.

== Ingredients ==
In Cantonese cuisine, a red bean soup made from rock sugar, sun-dried tangerine peels, and lotus seeds is commonly served as a dessert at the end of a restaurant or banquet meal. Common variations include the addition of ingredients such as sago (西米 xīmi), tapioca, coconut milk, ice cream, glutinous rice balls, or purple rice. The two types of sugar used interchangeably are rock sugar and sliced sugar (片糖).

== Gallery ==
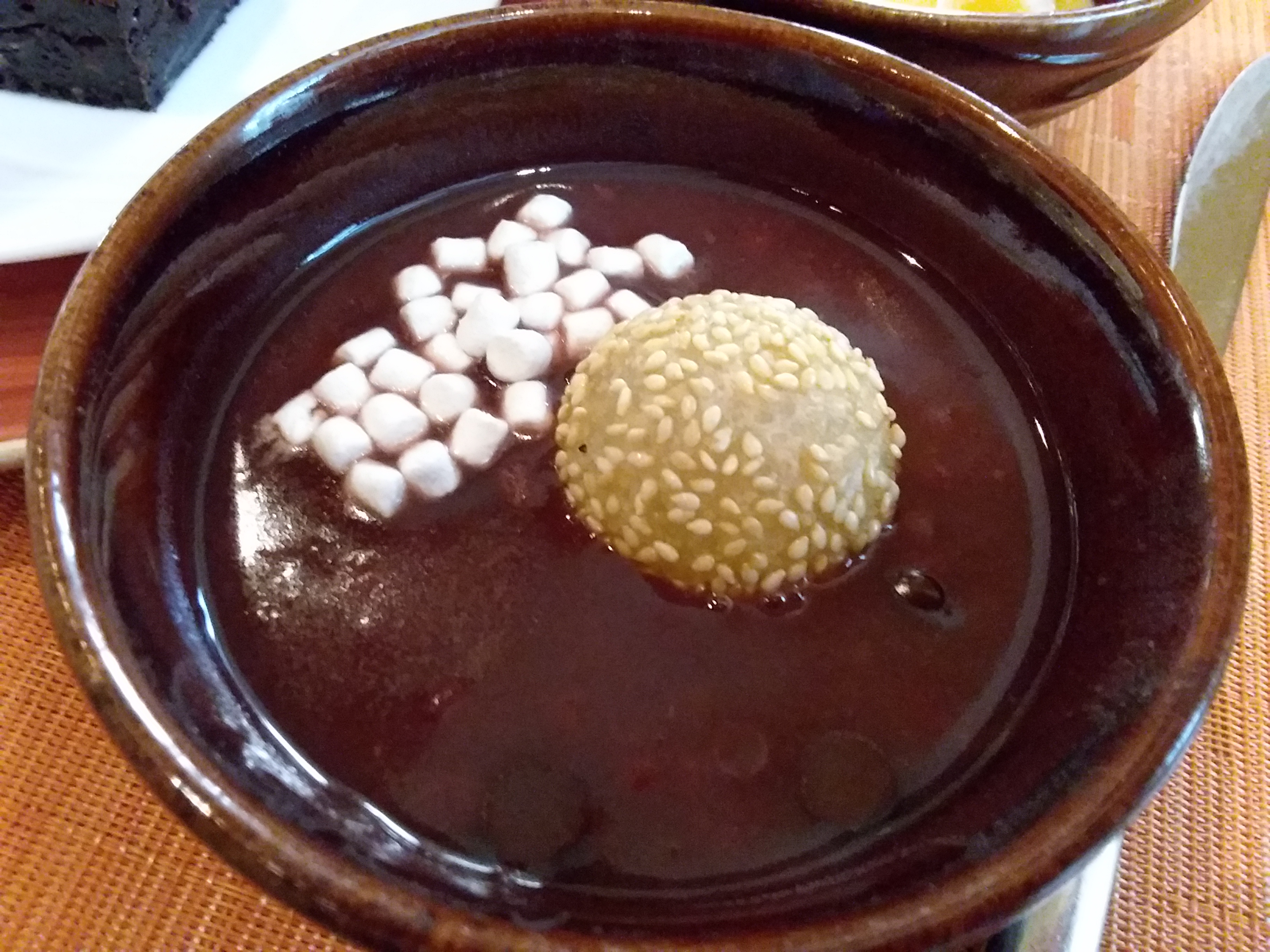
With jian dui ball

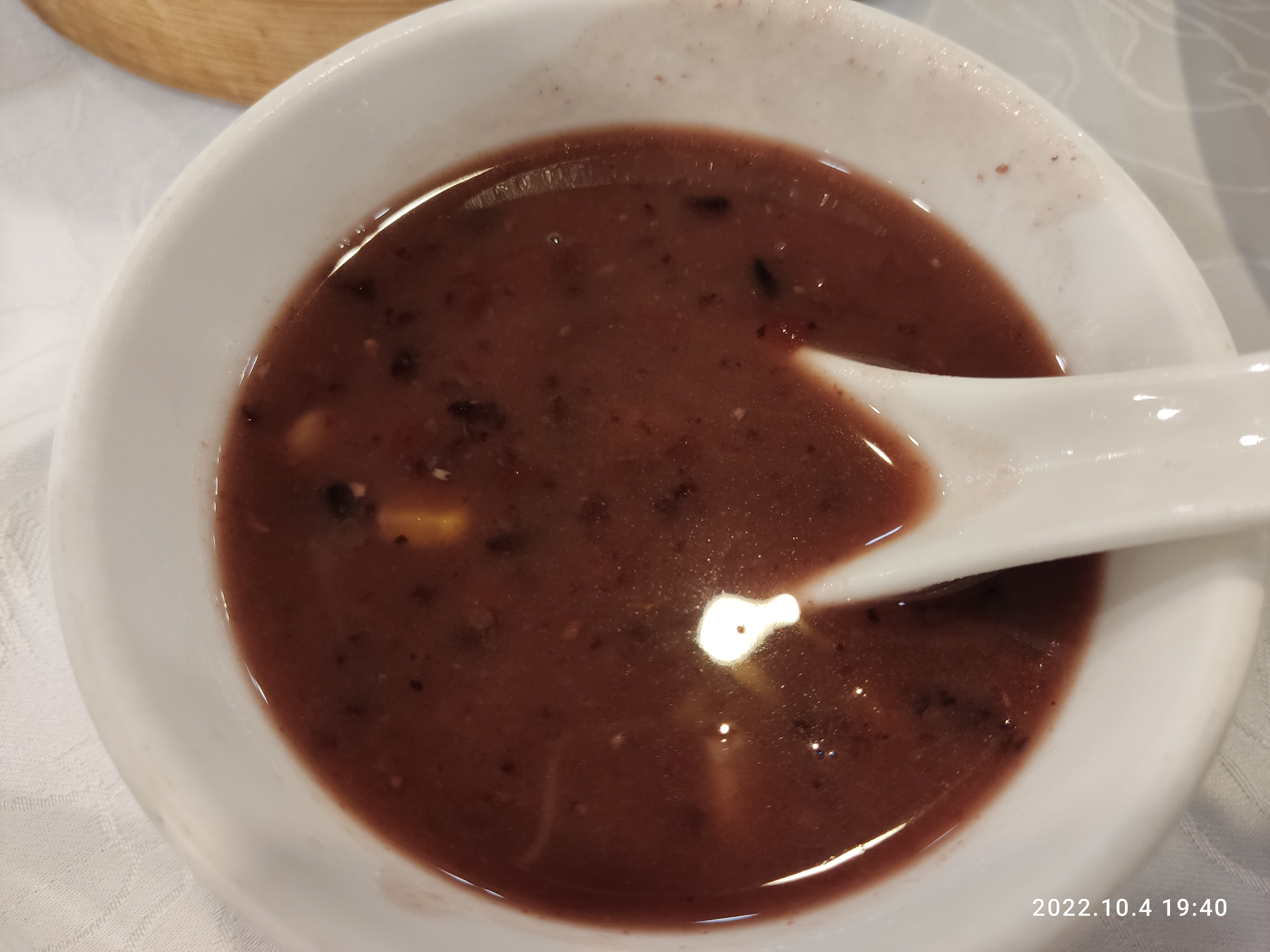

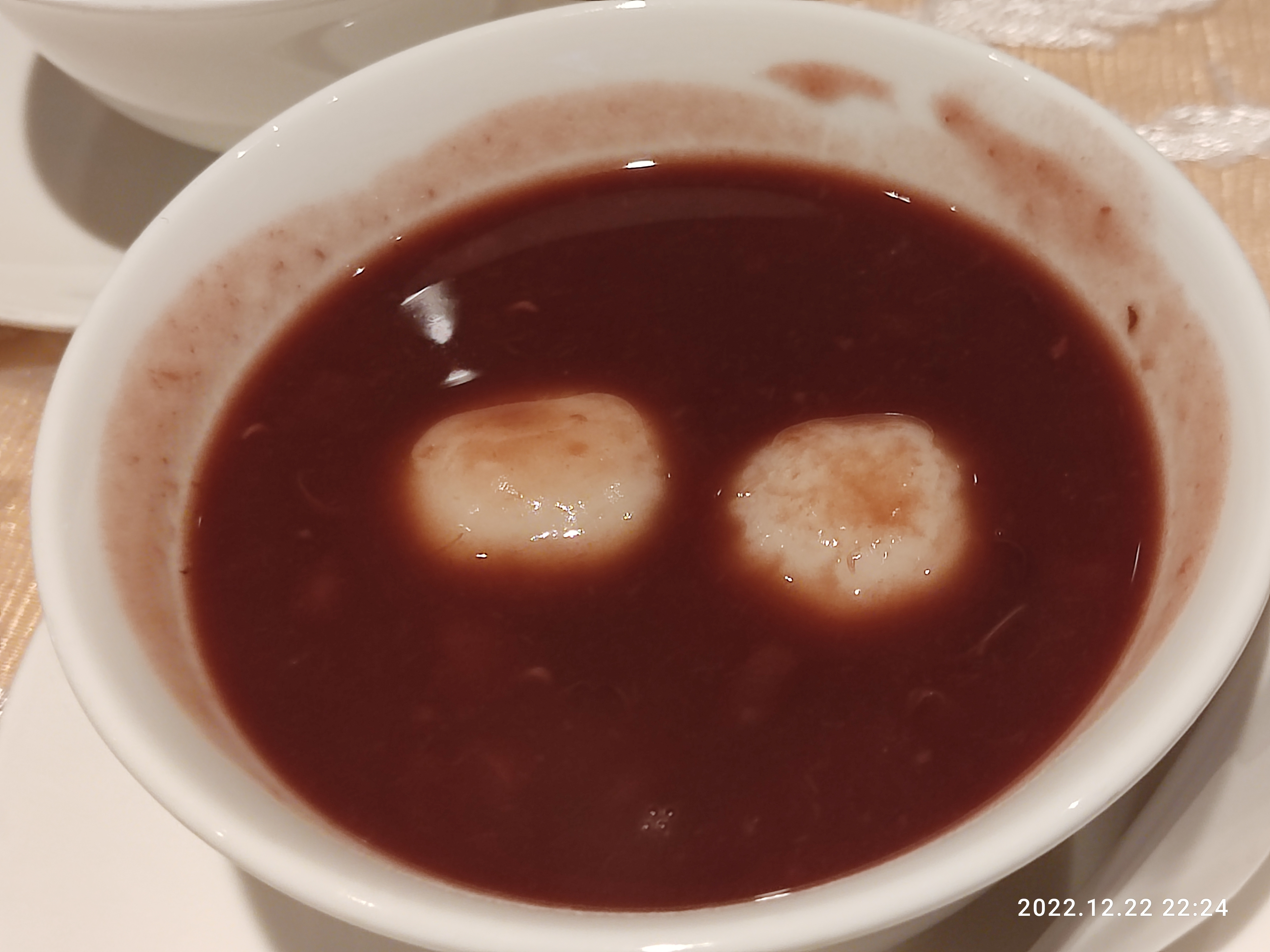

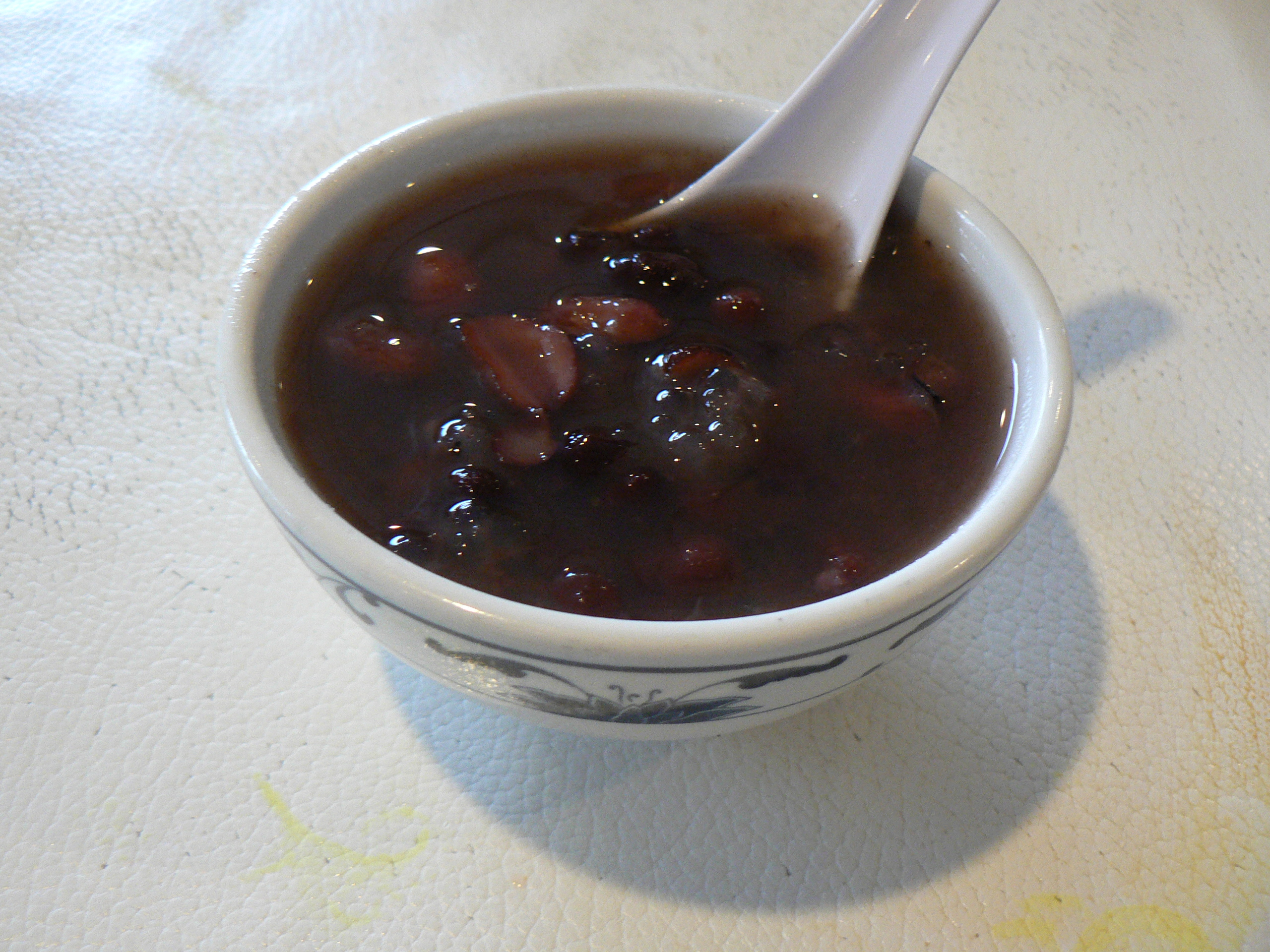

== See also ==
- Shiruko
- Patjuk
- Red bean ice
- Red bean paste
- Red bean shaved ice
- List of bean soups
- List of Chinese soups
- List of legume dishes
- List of soups
