= Amanattō =

Japanese traditional confectionery

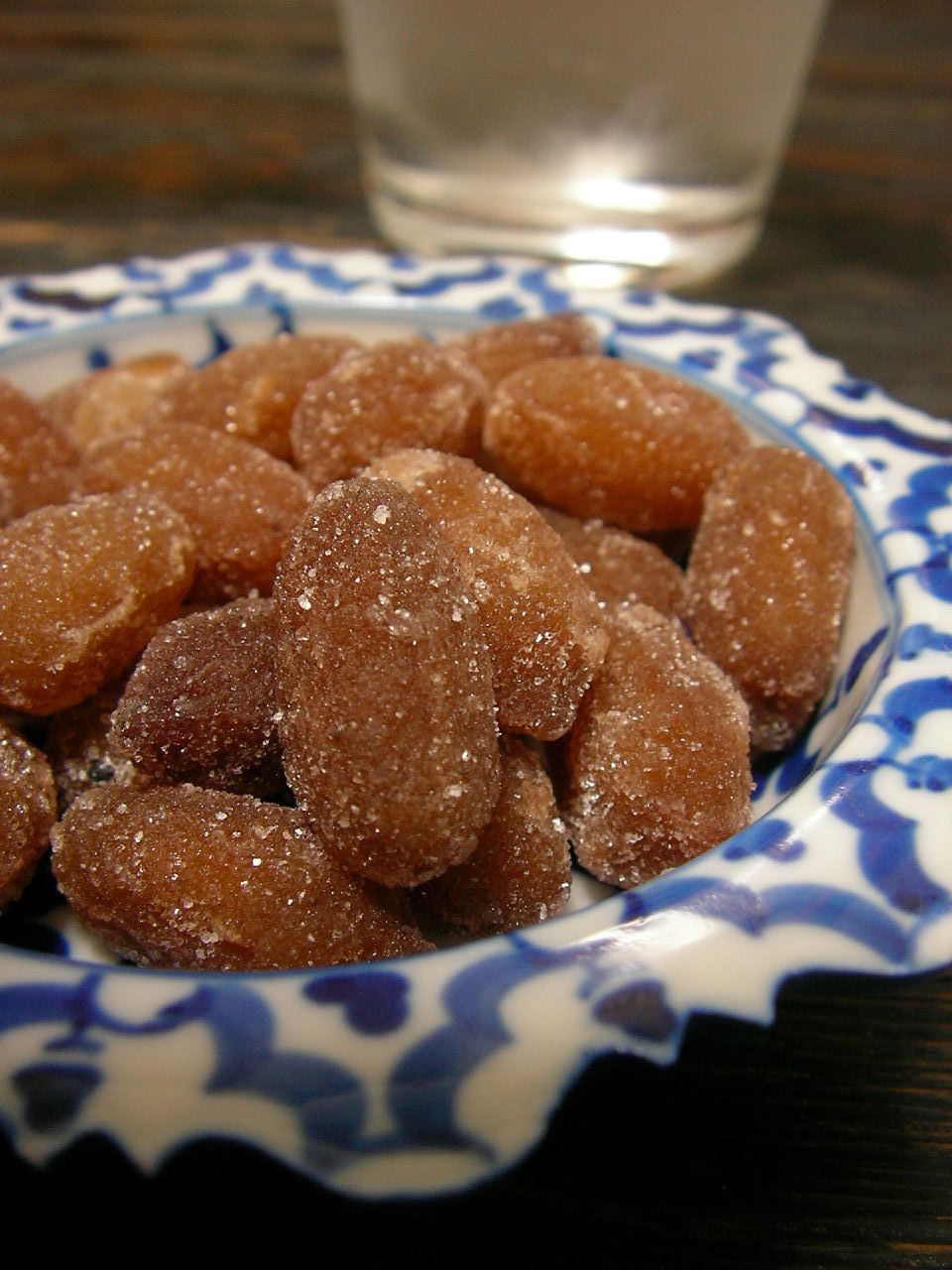
- Peanut amanattō
- Type: Confectionery
- Place of origin: Japan
- Region or state: East Asia
- Created by: Hosoda Yasubei
- Main ingredients: Adzuki or other beans, sugar, sugar syrup

Amanattō (甘納豆) is a Japanese traditional confectionery made of azuki or other beans, covered with refined sugar after simmering with sugar syrup and drying. It was developed by Hosoda Yasubei during the Bunkyū years (1861–1863) in the Edo period. He opened a wagashi store in Tokyo, which he named for his childhood name: Eitaro. This store continues to operate.

Amanattō was originally called amananattō (甘名納糖); the name was abbreviated to amanattō after World War II. The resemblance of the name to the fermented bean dish nattō is coincidental.

In Hokkaidō, amanattō is used in cooking sekihan. For this reason, unlike other areas in East Asia, the sekihan of Hokkaidō is a little sweet.

== See also ==
- List of legume dishes
