= Red bean ice =

Drink commonly found in Hong Kong

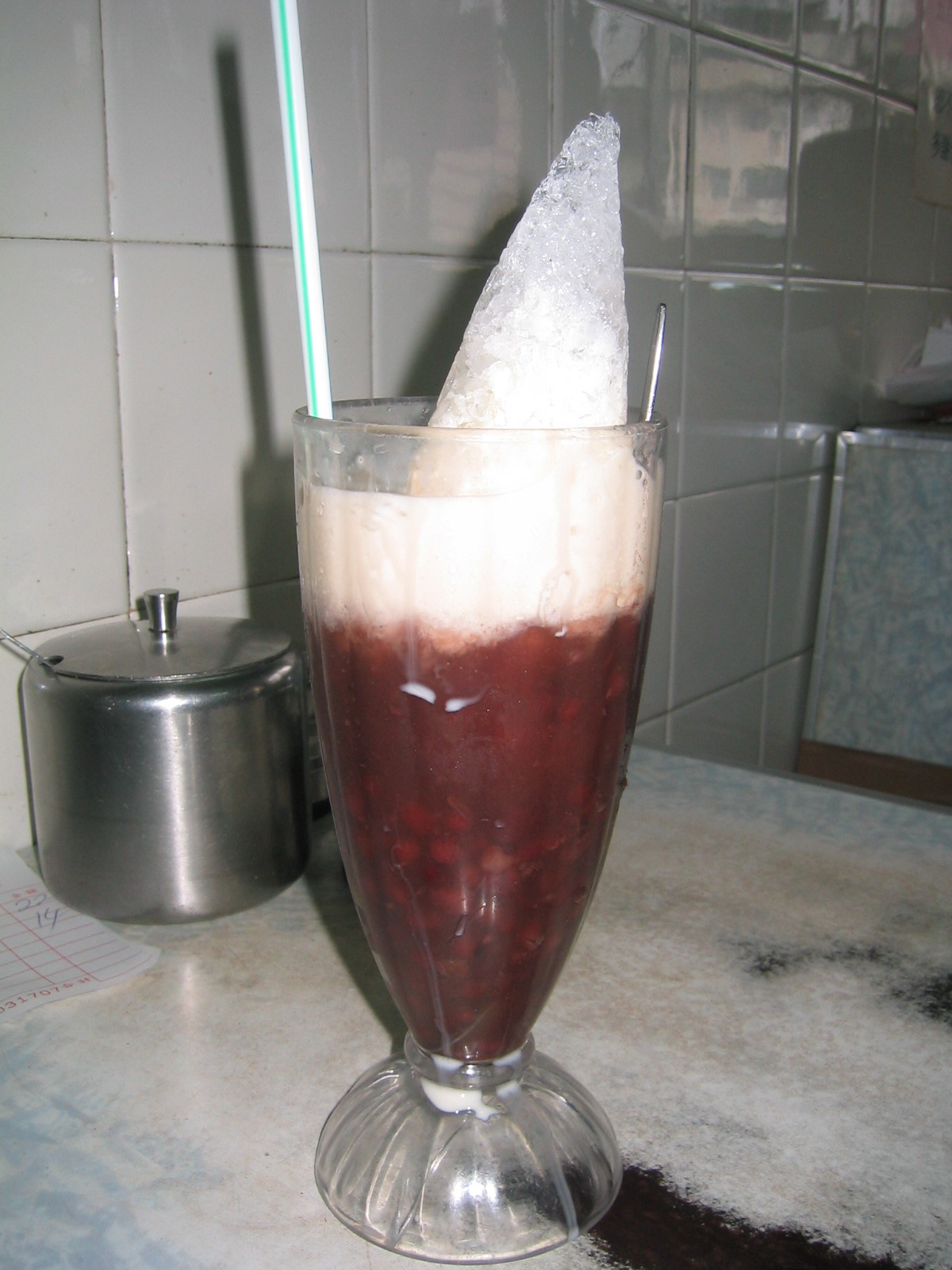
- Course: Dessert
- Place of origin: Hong Kong
- Serving temperature: Cold
- Main ingredients: azuki bean, rock sugar, evaporated milk

Red bean ice
- Traditional Chinese: 紅豆冰
- Simplified Chinese: 红豆冰
- Jyutping: hung4 dau2 bing1
- Literal meaning: red bean ice
Transcriptions
Standard Mandarin
- Hanyu Pinyin: hóngdòubīng
Yue: Cantonese
- Yale Romanization: hung4 dau2 bing1
- Jyutping: hung4 dau2 bing1

Red bean ice is a drink commonly found in Hong Kong. It is usually served in restaurants like cha chaan teng. It is a popular dessert in the summer. The standard ingredients include adzuki beans, light rock sugar syrup, and evaporated milk. It is often topped with ice cream to become a dessert known as red bean ice cream (traditional Chinese: 紅豆冰; simplified Chinese: 红豆冰).

== Origin ==
Red bean ice tea has been around since the 1970s. Some places which serve the drink add in chewy flavored jelly. Red bean icy is common in Hong Kong style cafés, Hong Kong style western restaurants and Hong Kong style fast food stores, but some restaurants such as fast food stores usually serve it only in summer, and some of them add a ball of ice-cream to the red bean icy, so it is called ice-cream red bean icy.

== See also ==
- Mango shaved ice
- Red bean soup
- Ice kachang
- List of legume dishes
