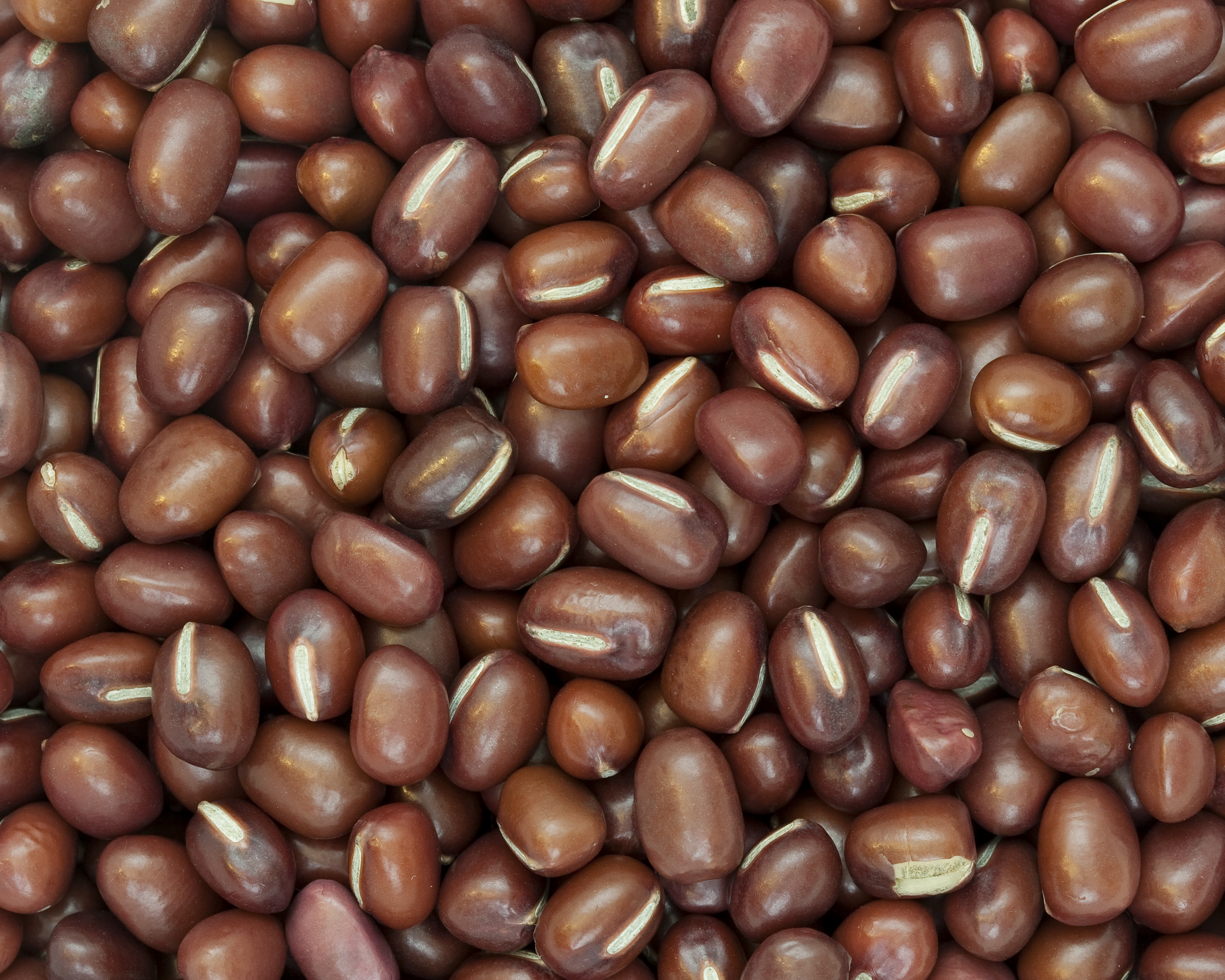
- Also called "red mung beans"

Conservation status
- Least Concern (IUCN 3.1)

Scientific classification
- Kingdom: Plantae
- Clade: Tracheophytes
- Clade: Angiosperms
- Clade: Eudicots
- Clade: Rosids
- Order: Fabales
- Family: Fabaceae
- Subfamily: Faboideae
- Genus: Vigna
- Species: V. angularis

Binomial name
- Vigna angularis (Willd.) Ohwi & H. Ohashi

= Adzuki bean =

Adzuki beans

East Asian crop

Vigna angularis, also known as the adzuki bean (Japanese: 小豆, Hepburn: azuki), azuki bean, aduki bean, red bean, or red mung bean, is an annual vine widely cultivated throughout East Asia for its small (approximately 5 mm or 1/4 in long) bean. The cultivars most familiar in East Asia have a uniform red color, but there are white, black, gray, and variously mottled varieties.

Scientists presume Vigna angularis var. nipponensis is the progenitor.

== Description ==
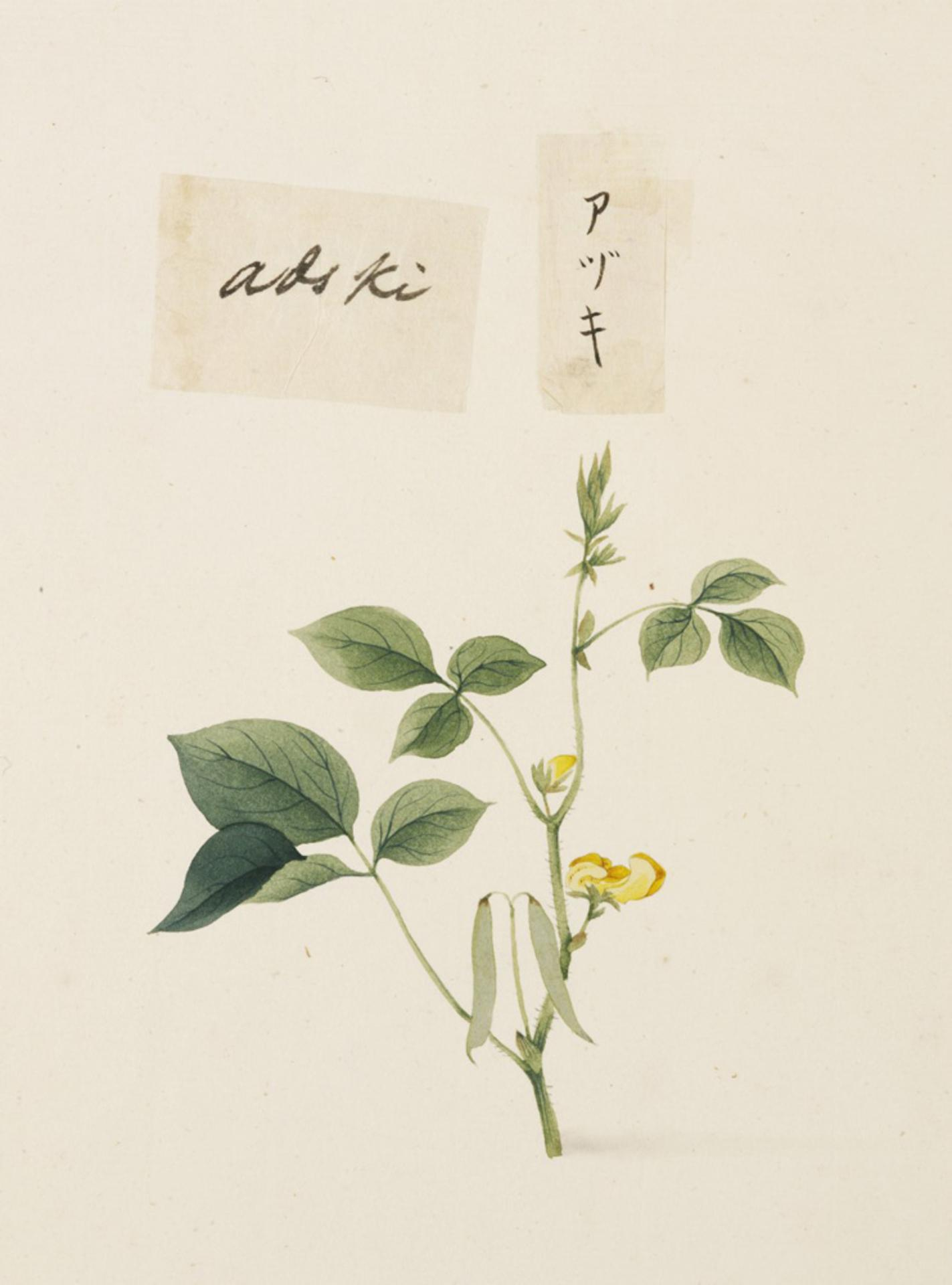
Drawing by Yūshi Ishizaki. Note the historical kana usage (アヅキ)

The description of the adzuki bean can vary between authors because there are both wild and cultivated forms of the plant. The adzuki bean is an annual, rarely biennial bushy erect or twining herb usually between 30 and 90 centimetres (12 and 35 in) high. There exist climbing or prostrate forms of the plant. The stem is normally green and sparsely pilose.

=== Roots ===
The adzuki bean has a taproot type of root system that can reach a depth of 40–50 centimetres (16–20 in) from the point of seed germination.

=== Leaves ===
The leaves of the adzuki bean are trifoliate, pinnate and arranged alternately along the stem on a long petiole. Leaflets are ovate and about 5–10 centimetres (2.0–3.9 in) long and 5–8 centimetres (2.0–3.1 in) wide.

=== Flowers ===
Adzuki flowers are papilionaceous and bright yellow. The inflorescence is an axillary false raceme consisting of six to ten (two to twenty) flowers.

=== Fruits ===
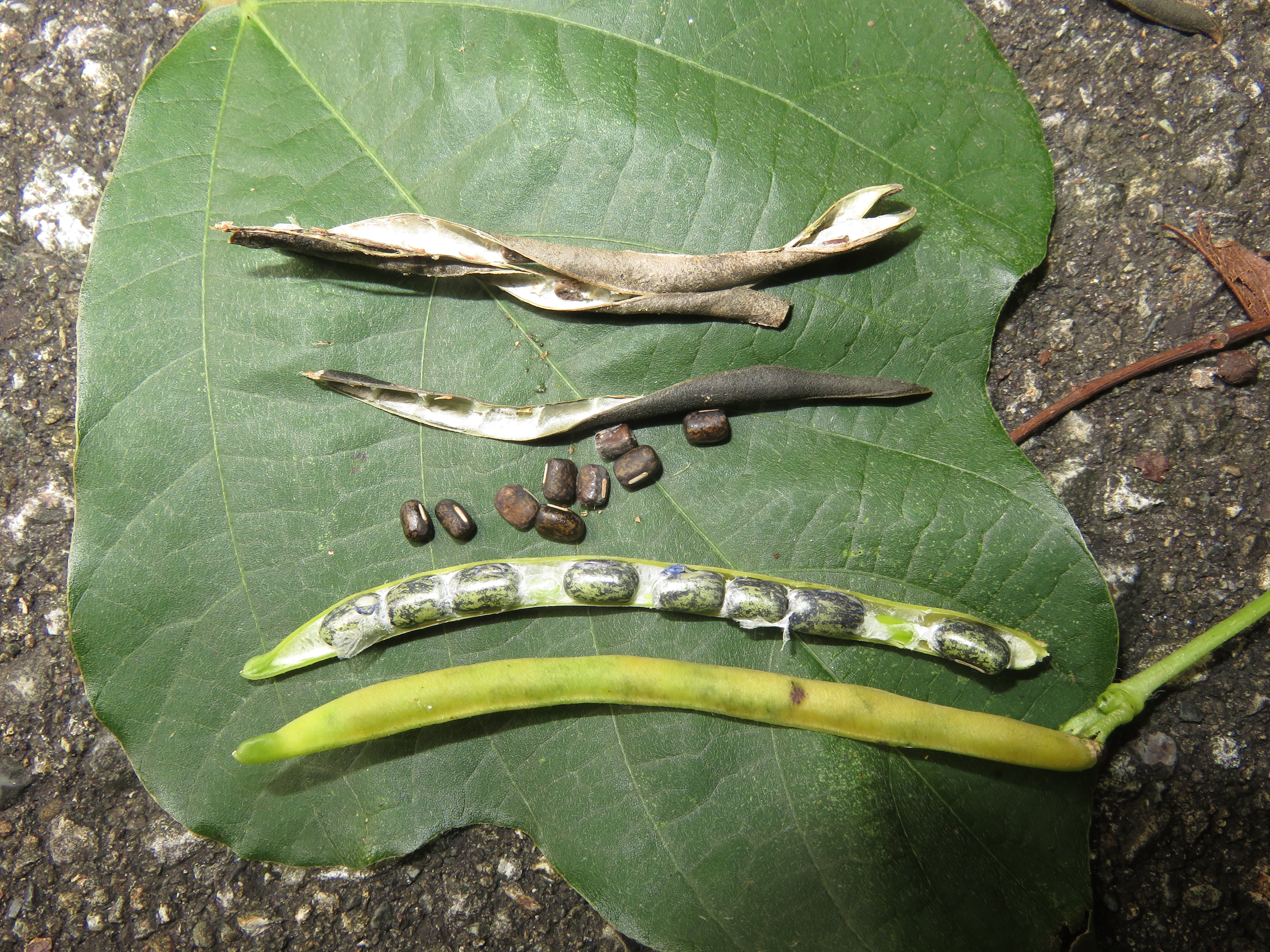
Pods and beans

Adzuki pods are smooth, cylindrical, and thin walled. The colour of the pods is green turning white to grey as they mature. The size is 5–13 by 0.5 centimetres (1.97 in–5.12 in × 0.20 in), with 2 to 14 seeds per pod. Pod shatter during seed ripening, and harvesting can be difficult under certain conditions.

=== Seeds ===
The seeds are smooth and subcylindric with a length of 5.0–9.1 millimetres (0.20–0.36 in), width of 4.0–6.3 millimetres (0.16–0.25 in), thickness of 4.1–6.0 millimetres (0.16–0.24 in). The thousand kernel weight is between 50 and 200 g. There are many different seed colours from maroon to blue-black mottled with straw.

=== Physiology ===
The emergence of the seedlings is hypogeal and takes 7–20 days. Compared to other pulses the growth of the plant is slow. Normally the adzuki plant reaches maturity between 80 and 120 days depending on the cultivar and the environmental conditions. Flowering lasts 30–40 days. Commonly the plant self-pollinates but cross-pollination also exists.

== Origin and diversity ==
=== Speciation and domestication ===
The wild ancestor of cultivated adzuki bean is probably Vigna angularis var. nipponensis, which is distributed across East Asia. Speciation between Vigna angularis var. nipponensis and Vigna angularis var. angularis occurred around 50,000 years ago. Wild adzuki likely originated near the Himalayas and spread naturally to central China and Japan. Archaeologists estimate it was domesticated around 3000 BC. However, adzuki beans, as well as soybeans, dating from 3000 BC to 2000 BC are indicated to still be largely within the wild size range. Enlarged seeds occurred during the later Bronze Age or Iron Age, periods with plough use.

Domestication of adzuki beans resulted in a trade-off between yield and seed size. Cultivated adzuki beans have fewer but longer pods, fewer but larger seeds, a shorter stature, and also a smaller overall seed yield than wild forms. The exact place of domestication is not known; multiple domestication origins in East Asia have been suggested.

Seed remains of adzuki beans discovered in the Central Highlands of Japan were dated to c. 6,000–4,000 BP, and represent to date the oldest evidence for its cultivation, supporting an origin in Japan. Evidence suggests that "wild azuki bean have been domesticated and cultivated in Japan for over 10,000 years".

While archaeological studies found early traces of adzuki cultivation in Japan, genetic studies identified highest cultivar genetic variation in central China, suggesting the first domestication in China. Cultivated azuki beans have been found in Shandong, dated to the 9th millennium BC.

Consistent with archaeological records, a genomic study indicated that all present-day adzuki cultivars descended from the wild adzuki in eastern Japan near the Central Highlands, at about 3000–5000 BP. The cultivars later spread to China and hybridized with local wild adzuki in China, resulting in the high genetic variation of central Chinese cultivars. The study therefore reconciles the discrepancy between archaeological and early genetic studies. Mutations conferring key domestication syndromes (loss of pod shattering and change of seed coat color) also had a single origin in Japan. These mutations originated and continued to increase in frequency since about 10,000 BP, suggesting that domestication syndromes were being selected by the Jōmon people much earlier than clear archaeological traces of large-scale cultivation.

=== Breeding ===
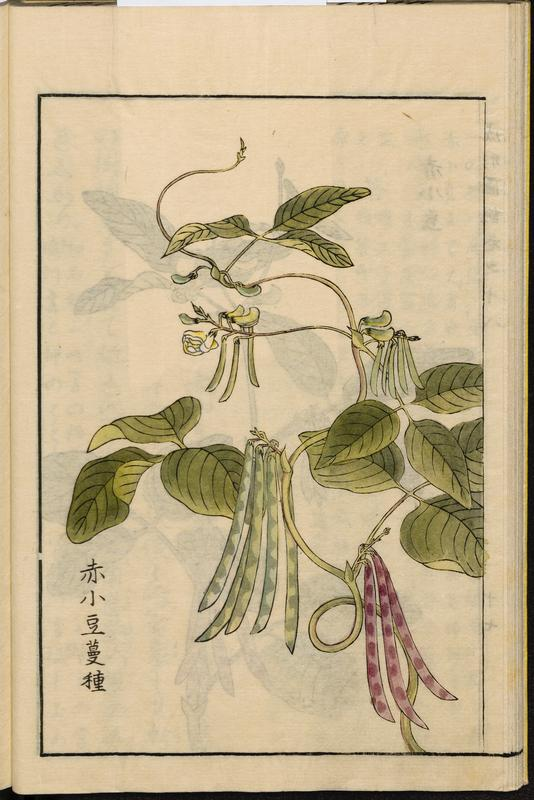
Seikei Zusetsu, 1804

In Japan, the adzuki bean was one of the first crops subjected to scientific plant breeding. Important breeding traits are yield, pureness of the bean colour, and the maturing time. Separate cultivars with smaller seeds and higher biomass are bred for fodder production and as green manure. Locally adapted cultivars are available in China, Japan, Korea, and Taiwan.

More than 300 cultivars/landraces/breeding lines are registered in Japan. Large germplasm collections of adzuki bean are in China, at the Institute of Crop Germplasm Resources (CAAS), Beijing, with more than 3,700 accessions, and Japan, at the Tokachi Agricultural Experiment Station, Hokkaido, with about 2,500 accessions.

=== Weed forms ===
Weed forms of adzuki bean frequently occur in Japan. The wide spread of weed forms is due to adaptation to human-disturbed habitats, escapes of old cultivars, and natural establishment from derivatives of hybrids between cultivars and wild forms. In contrast to wild forms, the weed forms of adzuki bean are used as a substitute for the cultivated form and consumed as sweet beans, especially if cultivated adzuki beans are attacked by pests. However, in cultivated gardens the weed form is recognized as contamination and lowers the seed quality of adzuki cultivars.

== Names ==
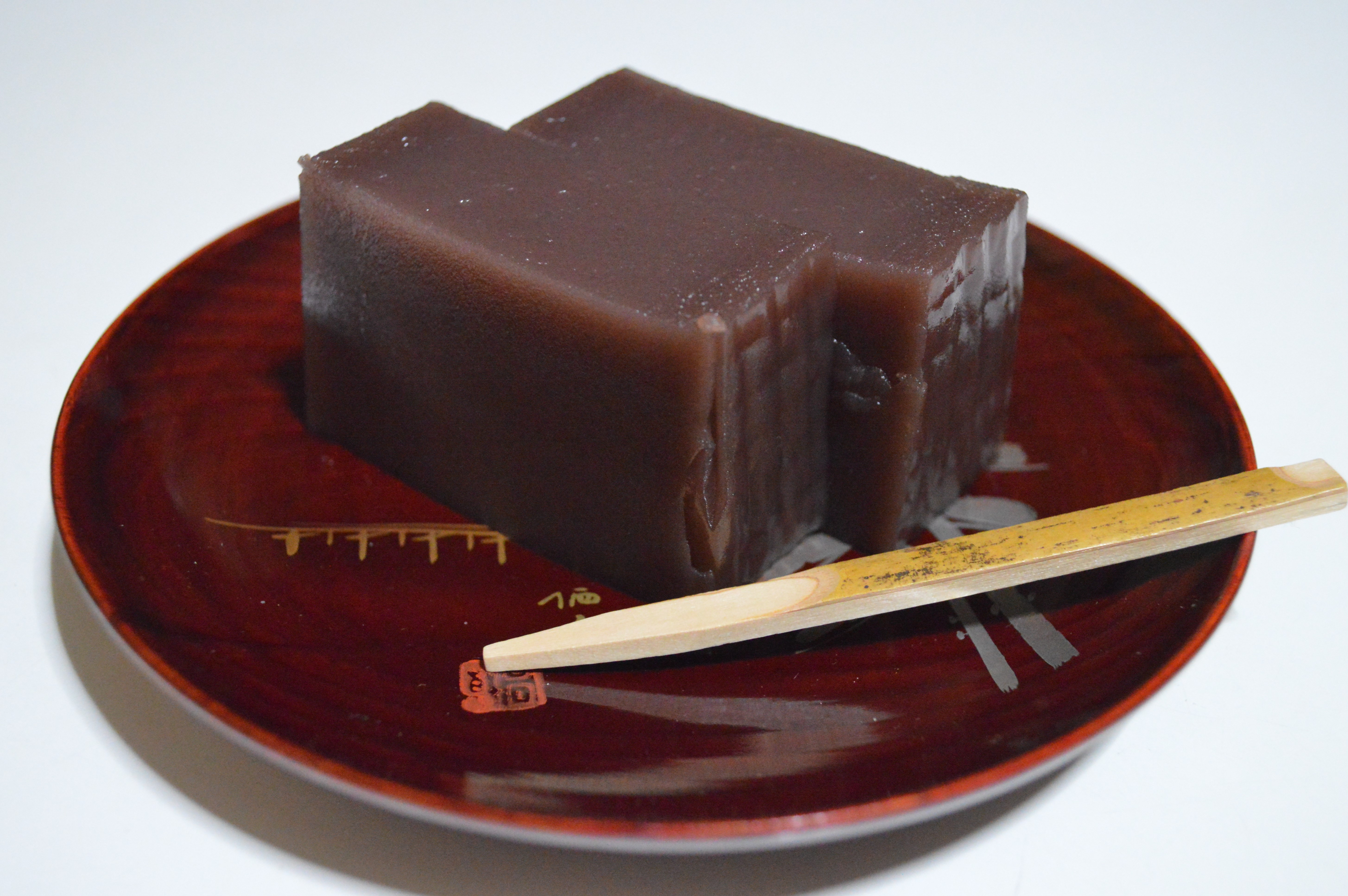
Yōkan, a Japanese confection made of adzuki bean paste, agar, and sugar

The name adzuki is a transliteration of the Japanese アヅキ, as it was spelled according to historical kana orthography. The names azuki and aduki reflect the modern pronunciation アズキ (hiragana: あずき). All are meant to represent the same Modern Japanese pronunciation, azuki.

Japanese also has a Chinese loanword, shōzu (小豆), which means "small bean", its counterpart "large bean" (大豆, daizu) being the soybean. It is common to write 小豆 in kanji but pronounce it as azuki, an example of jukujikun. In China, the corresponding name (Chinese: 小豆; pinyin: xiǎodòu) still is used in botanical or agricultural parlance. In everyday Chinese, the more common terms are hongdou (红豆; 紅豆; hóngdòu) and chidou (赤豆; chìdòu), both meaning "red bean", because almost all Chinese cultivars are uniformly red.

In English the beans are often described as "red beans" in the context of Chinese cuisine, such as with red bean paste. In Korean, adzuki beans are called pat (팥) and it contrasts with kong (콩, "bean"), rather than being considered a type of it. Kong ("beans") without qualifiers usually means soybeans. In Vietnamese it is called đậu đỏ (literally: red bean). In some parts of India, the beans are referred to as "red chori". In Marathi, it is known as lal chavali (लाल चवळी), literally meaning 'red cowpea'. In Iraq its name is lūbyā ḥamrāˈ (لوبيا حمراء) meaning "red cowpeas".

== Cultivation ==
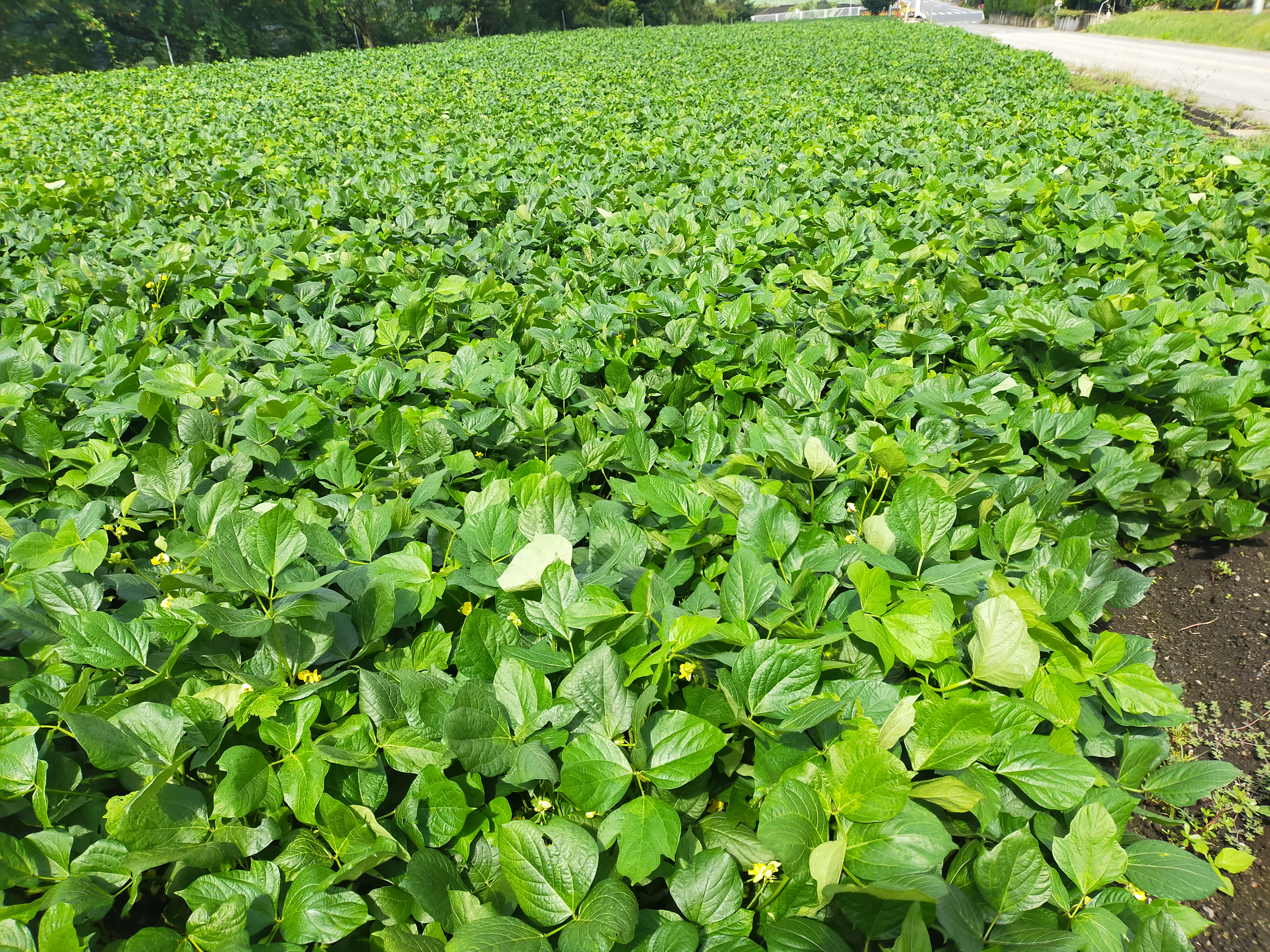
Field of azuki bean plants in Gunma, Japan

=== Area and yield ===
The adzuki bean is mainly cultivated in China (670,000 hectares or 1,700,000 acres), Japan (60,000 hectares or 150,000 acres), South Korea (25,000 hectares or 62,000 acres), and Taiwan (15,000 hectares or 37,000 acres) (data published 2006). The bean is also grown commercially in the US, South America, India, New Zealand, Congo, and Angola.

In Japan, the adzuki bean is the second most important legume after the soy bean. In 1998, the annual crop yield was around 100,000 tonnes (98,000 long tons; 110,000 short tons). In 2006, Japan consumed about 140,000 tonnes (140,000 long tons; 150,000 short tons)/year. Japan is the largest importer of adzuki beans. The imports come from China, Korea, Colombia, Taiwan, the US, Thailand, and Canada.

=== Ecological requirements ===
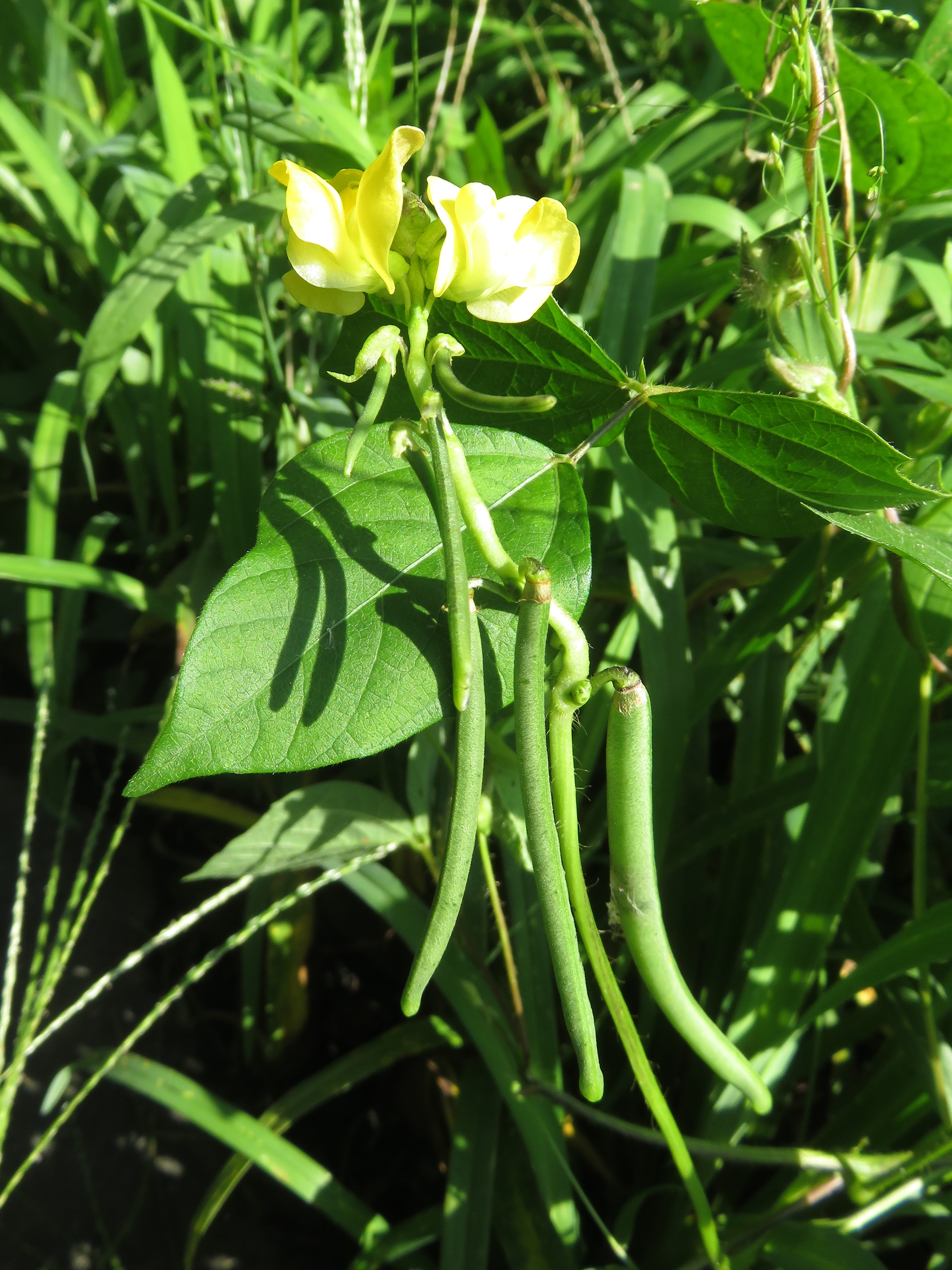
Flowers and pods

Optimal temperature range for adzuki bean growth is between 15 and 30 °C (59 and 86 °F). The crop is not frost-hardy and needs soil temperatures above 6–10 °C (43–50 °F) (30–34 °C (86–93 °F) optimal) for germination. Hot temperatures stimulate vegetative growth and are therefore less favorable for pea production. The adzuki bean is usually not irrigated. Annual rainfall ranges from 500 to 1,750 millimetres (20 to 69 in) in areas where the bean is grown. The plant can withstand drought but severe reduction in yield is expected. The cultivation of the adzuki bean is possible on preferably well drained soils with pH 5–7.5. Fertilizer application differs widely depending on expected yield but is generally similar to soybean. Due to nodulation with rhizobia, nitrogen fixation of up to 100 kilograms per hectare (89 lb/acre) is possible.

=== Production ===
The sowing of the peas is in 2–3 centimetres (0.79–1.18 in) depth in rows 30–90 centimetres (12–35 in) apart and 10–45 centimetres (3.9–17.7 in) within the row. Rarely seeds are sown by broadcast. The amount of seeds ranges between 8–70 kilograms per hectare (7.1–62.5 lb/acre). Growth of the crop is slow, therefore weed control is crucial mainly between germination and flowering. Cultivation systems differ largely among different countries. In China adzuki bean is often grown in intercrops with maize, sorghum and millet while in Japan the bean is grown in crop rotations. Harvest of the peas should not be done as long as moisture content of the seed is higher than 16%.

=== Pests and diseases ===
Fungal and bacterial diseases of the adzuki bean are powdery mildew, brown stem rot, and bacterial blight. Furthermore, pests such as the adzuki pod worm, Japanese butterbur borer, and cutworm attack the crop. The bean weevil is an important storage pest.

== Culinary uses ==
In East Asian cuisine, adzuki beans are most commonly sweetened before eating. They are often boiled with sugar to produce red bean paste, a widely used ingredient throughout the region. The paste is sometimes flavored with ingredients such as chestnut and serves as a filling or topping in numerous traditional dishes.

In Chinese cuisine, red bean paste appears in foods such as tangyuan, zongzi, mooncakes, baozi, and red bean ice. A more liquid preparation, made by boiling adzuki beans with sugar and a pinch of salt, is known as hong dou tang, a sweet soup-like dessert.

In Japanese cuisine, red bean paste is used in confections including anpan, dorayaki, imagawayaki, manjū, monaka, anmitsu, taiyaki, and daifuku. It is also used in amanattō and in ice cream, either as whole beans or as a paste. Rice with adzuki beans (赤飯; sekihan) is traditionally prepared in Japan for auspicious occasions.

Across East Asia, red bean paste and adzuki beans are also enjoyed in waffles, pastries, baked buns, spring rolls, and biscuits. In addition, adzuki beans may be eaten sprouted or boiled in a hot, tea-like drink.

Adzuki beans, cooked, no salt
Nutritional value per 100 g
- Energy: 536 kJ (128 kcal)
- Carbohydrates: 24.8 g
- Dietary fiber: 7.3 g
- Fat: 0.1 g
- Protein: 7.5 g
Vitamins and minerals
Vitamins	Quantity %DV^{†}
Thiamine (B1)	10% 0.12 mg
Riboflavin (B2)	5% 0.06 mg
Niacin (B3)	5% 0.72 mg
Pantothenic acid (B5)	9% 0.43 mg
Vitamin B6	6% 0.1 mg
Folate (B9)	30% 121 μg
Vitamin C	0% 0 mg
Minerals	Quantity %DV^{†}
Calcium	2% 28 mg
Copper	33% 0.3 mg
Iron	11% 2 mg
Magnesium	12% 52 mg
Manganese	25% 0.57 mg
Phosphorus	13% 168 mg
Potassium	18% 532 mg
Selenium	2% 1.2 μg
Sodium	0% 8 mg
Zinc	16% 1.8 mg
- Other constituents: Quantity
- Water: 66 g
- USDA Database entry
- ^{†}Percentages estimated using US recommendations for adults, except for potassium, which is estimated based on expert recommendation from the National Academies.

== Nutritional information ==
Cooked adzuki beans are 66% water, 25% carbohydrates, including 7% dietary fiber, 8% protein, and contain negligible fat (table). In a 100-gram reference amount, cooked beans provide 536 kilojoules (128 kilocalories) of food energy, a moderate to high content (10% or more of the Daily Value, DV) of the B vitamin folate (30% DV), and several dietary minerals (11% to 27% DV, table).

== Gallery ==
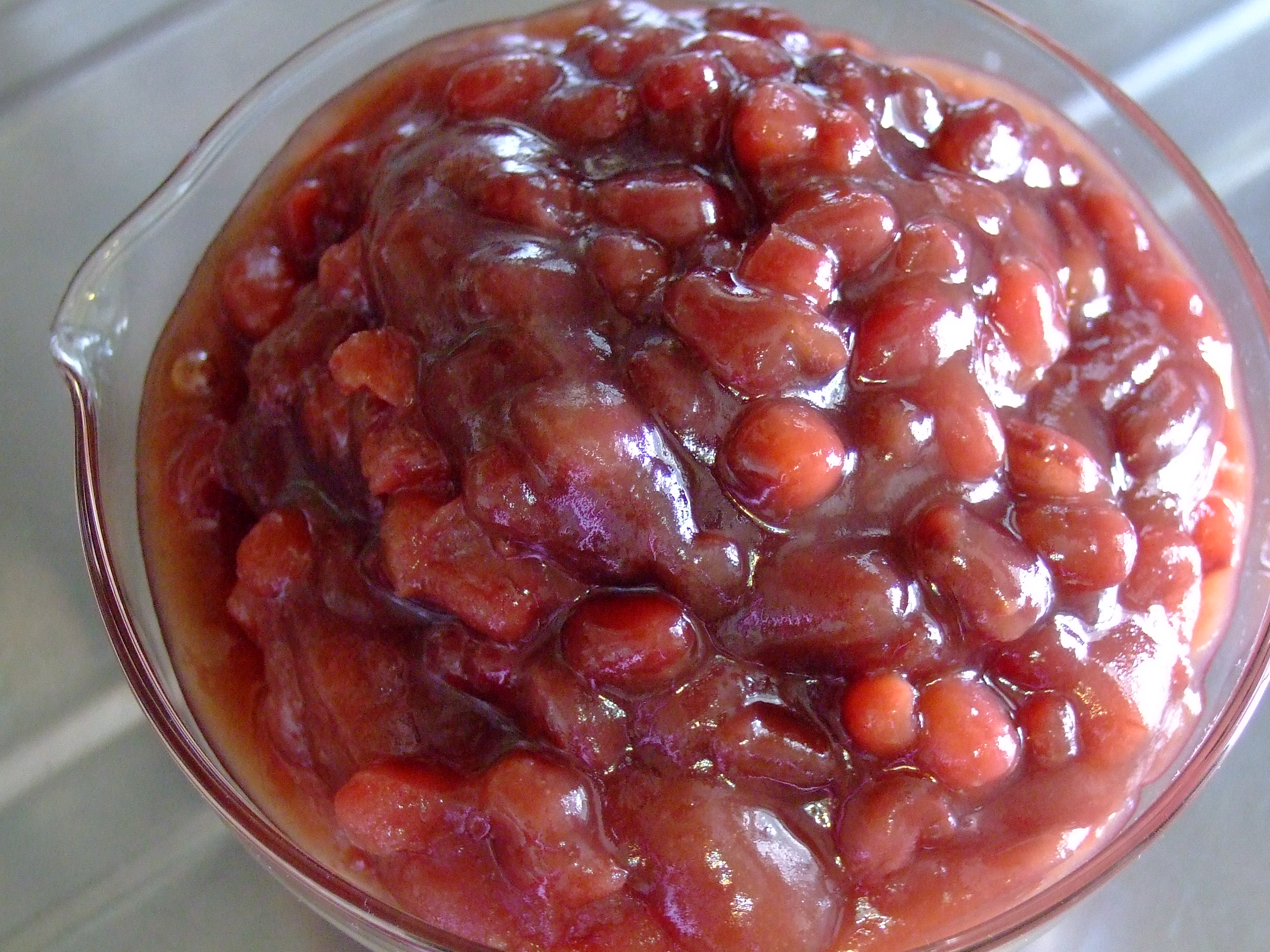
Red bean paste

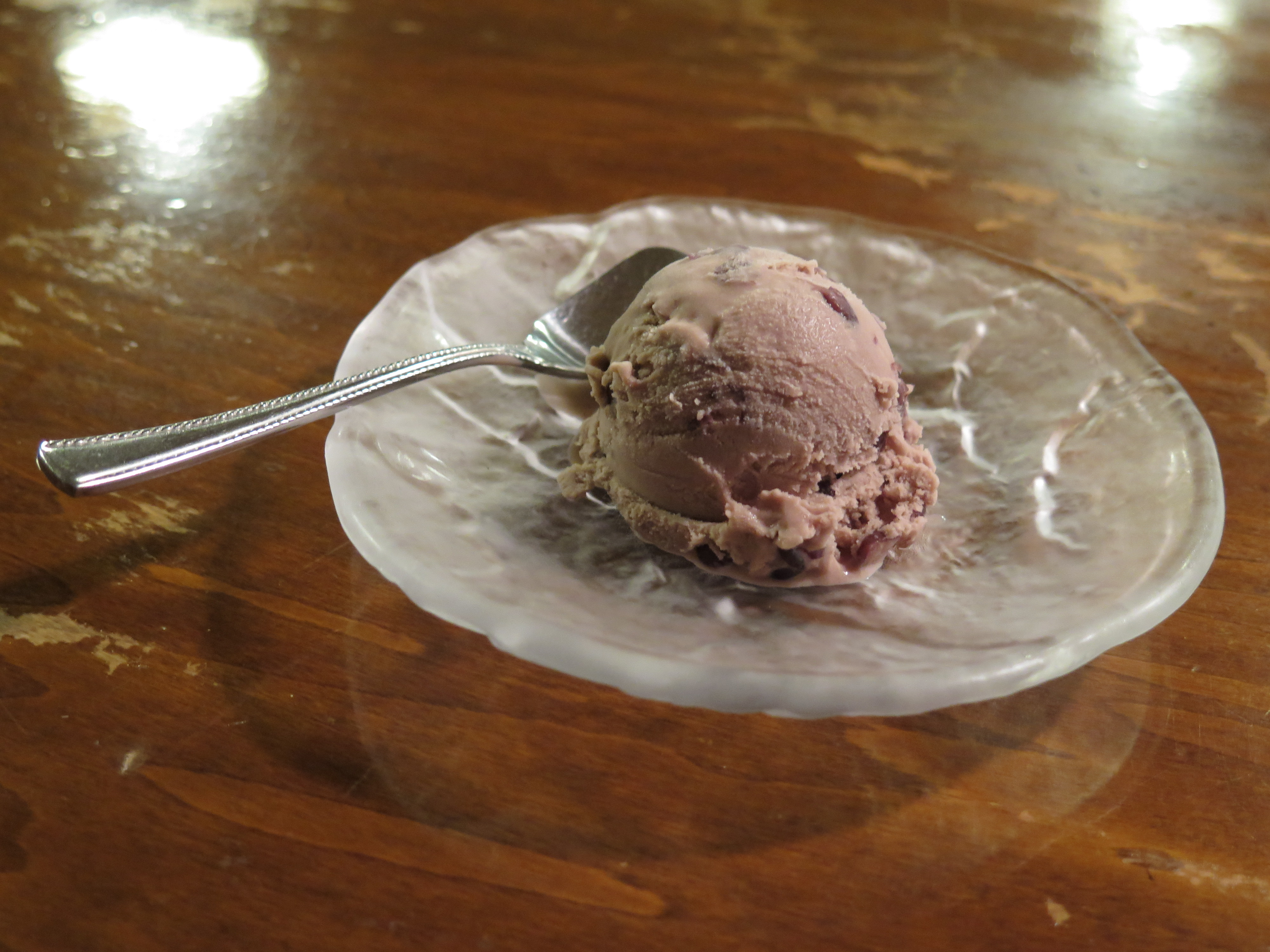
Adzuki bean ice cream

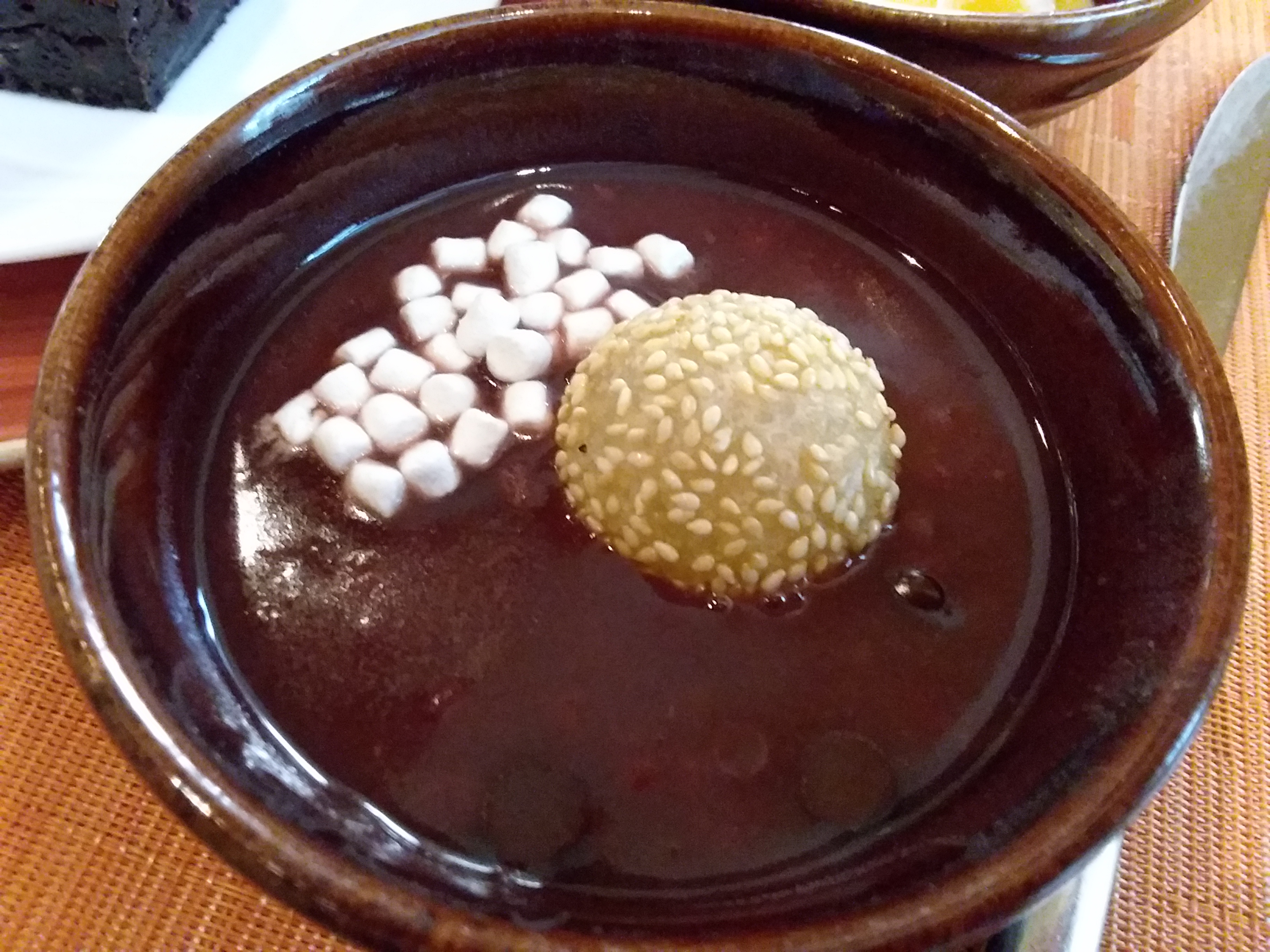
Chinese hong dou tang

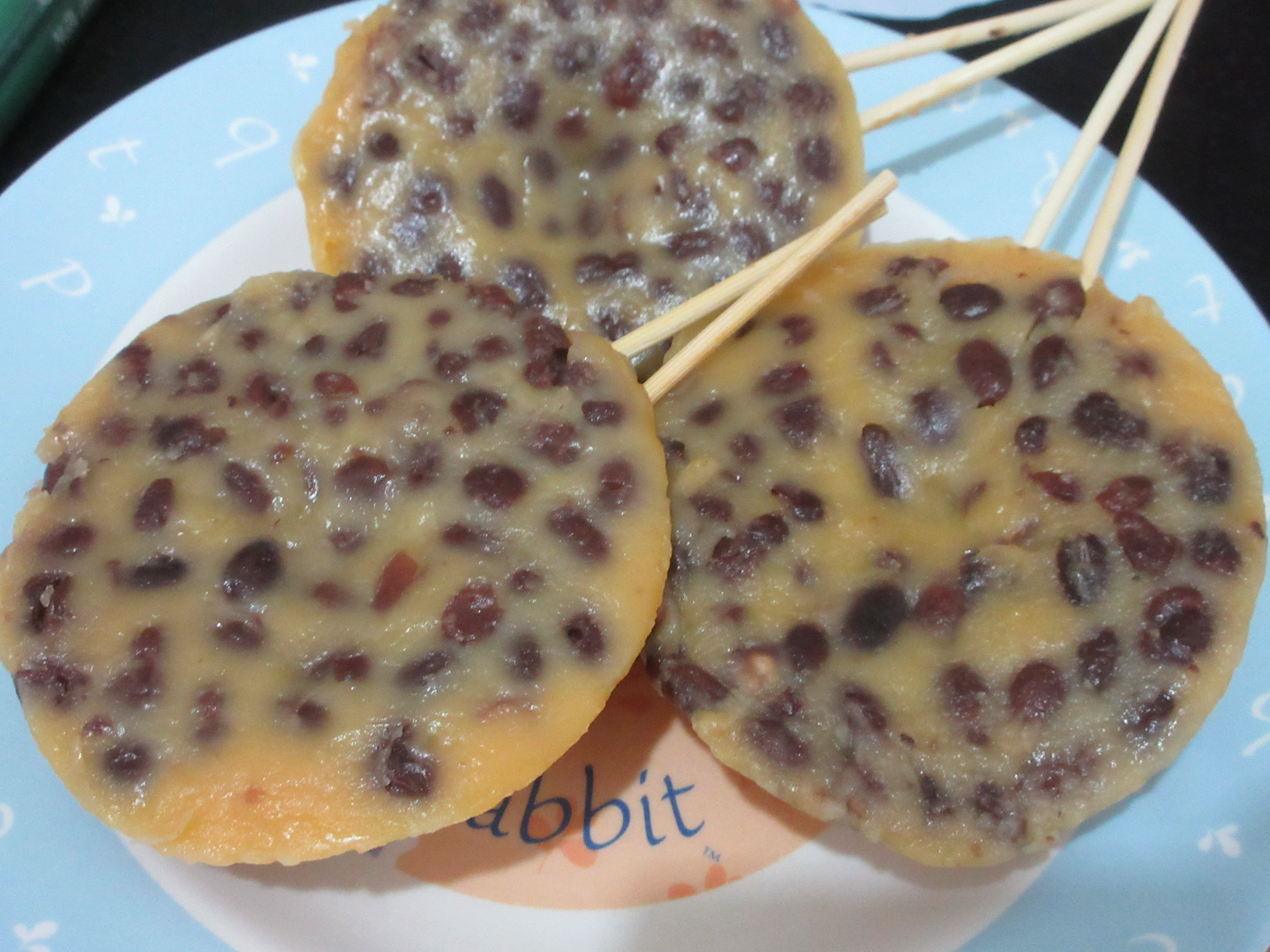
Chinese put chai ko

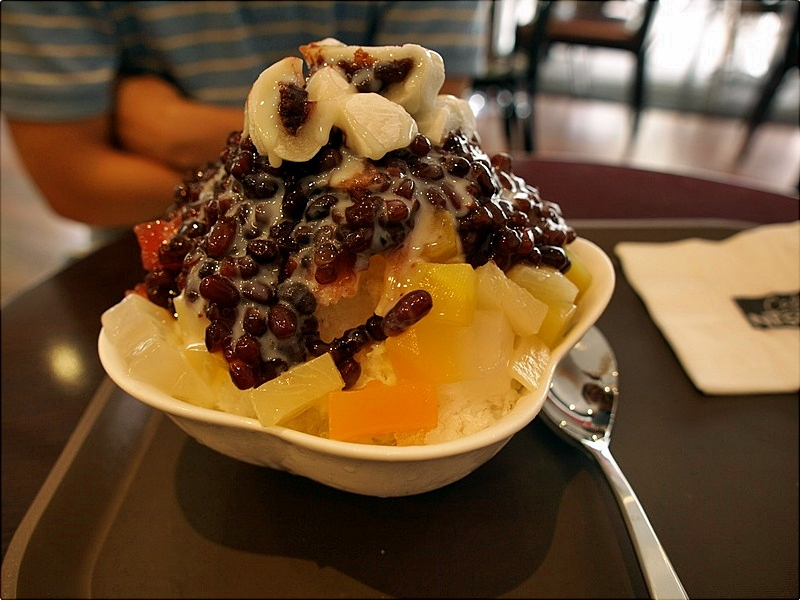
Korean patbingsu

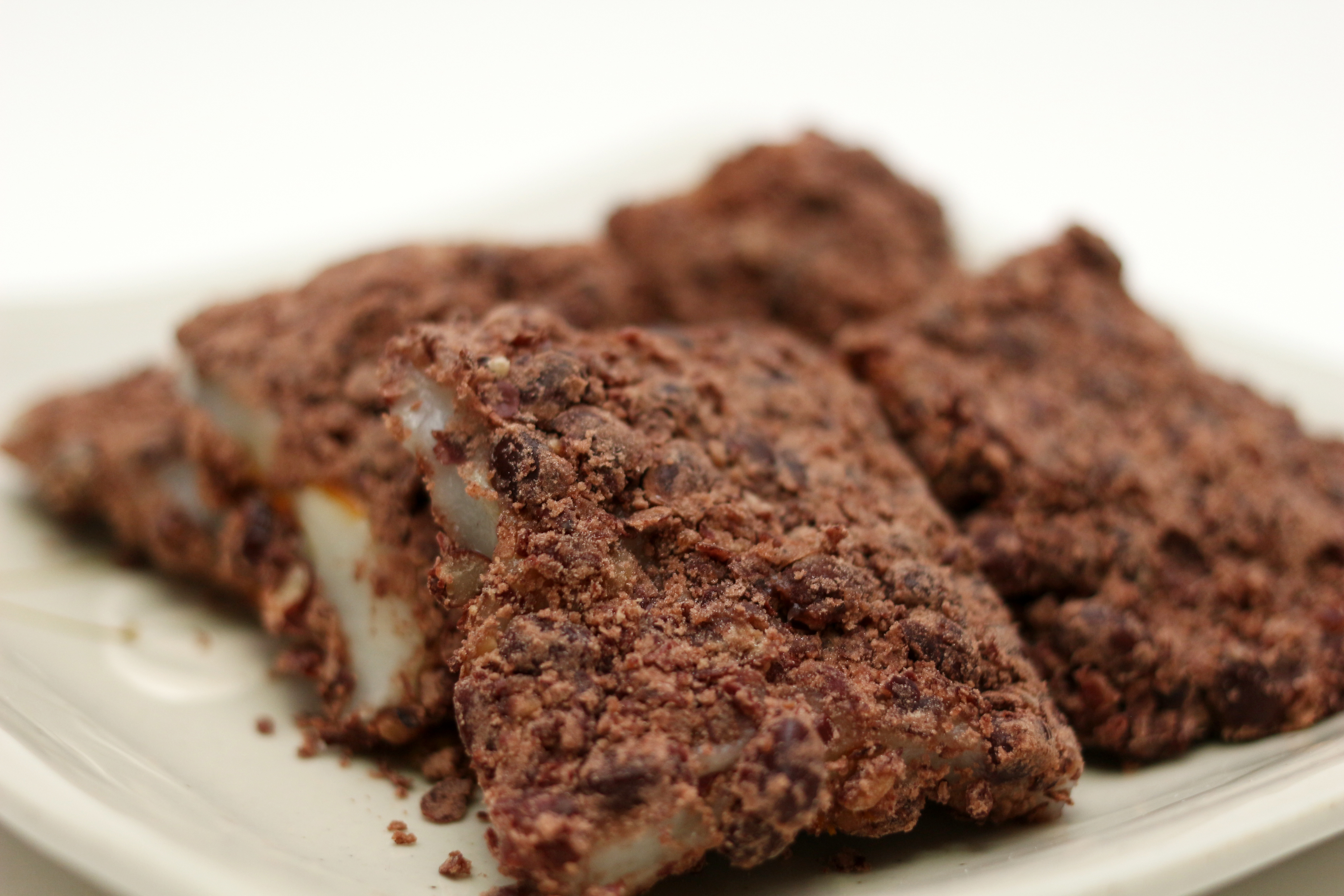
Korean sirutteok

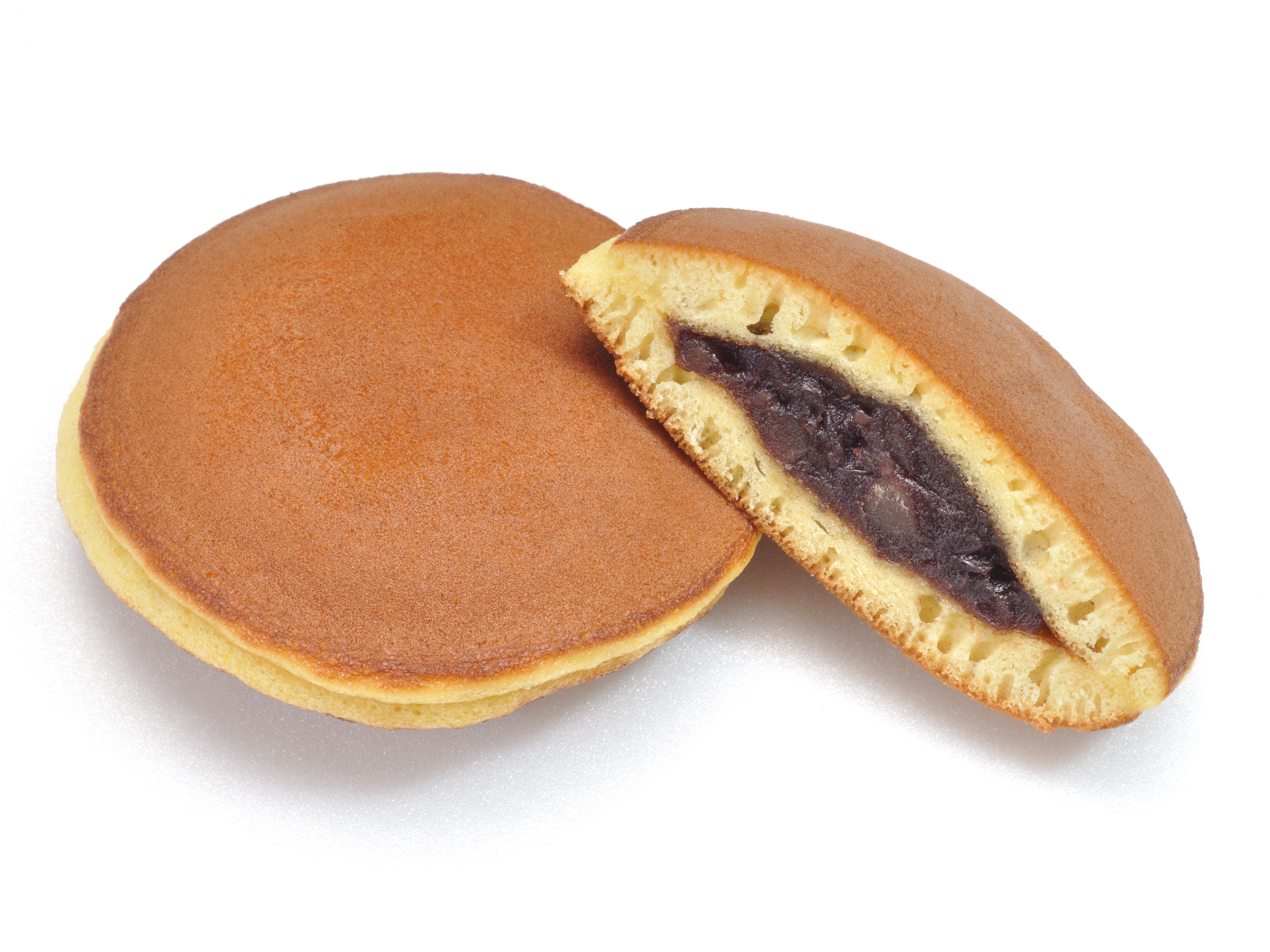
Japanese dorayaki

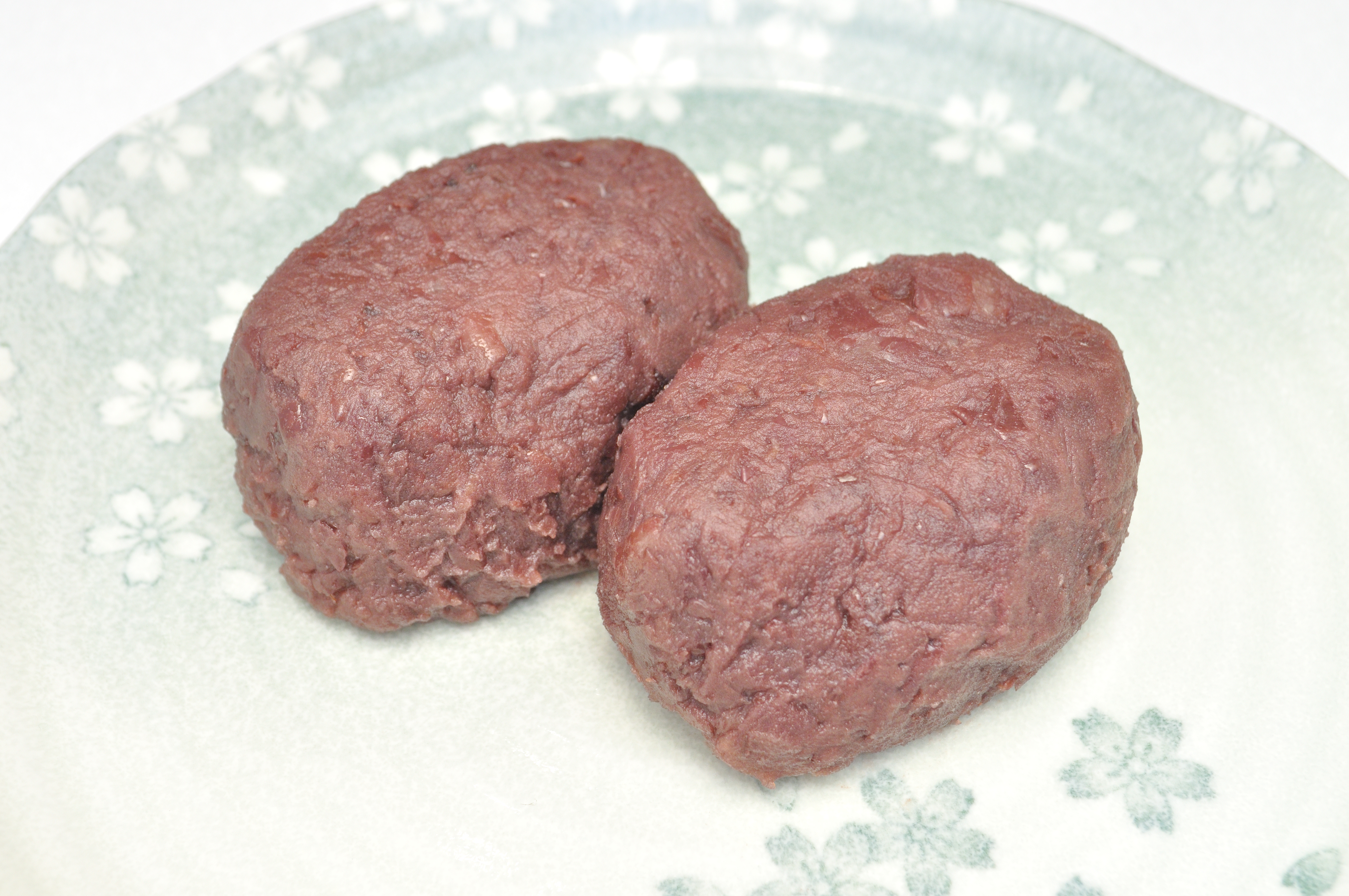
Japanese botamochi

== See also ==
- Black-eyed pea
- Kidney beans
- Red bean paste
- Sea Island red pea
- Sekihan
