= List of legume dishes =

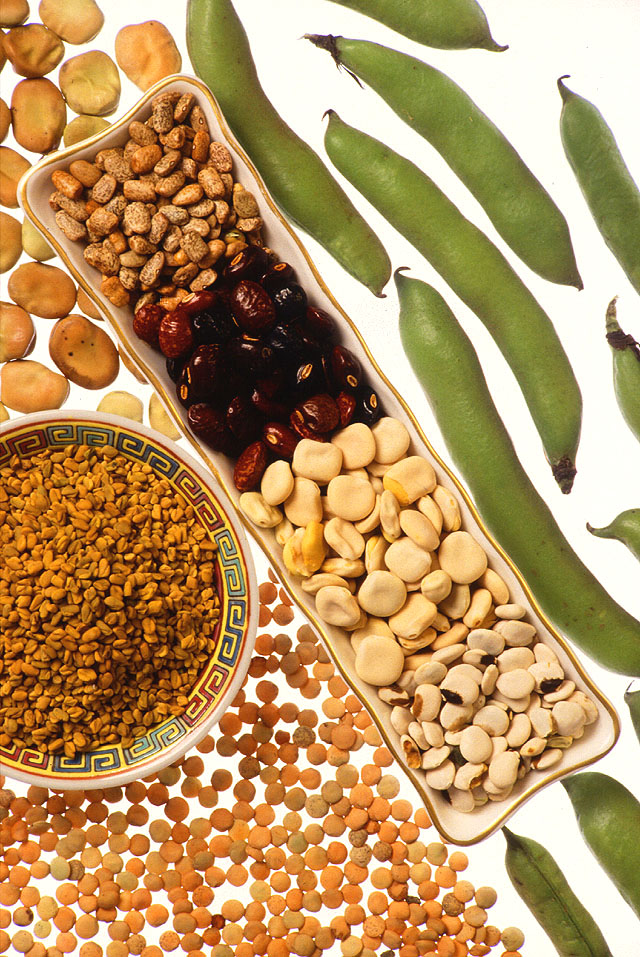
A selection of various legumes

This is a list of legume dishes. A legume is a plant in the family Fabaceae (or Leguminosae), or the fruit or seed of such a plant. Legumes are grown agriculturally, primarily for their food grain seed (e.g. beans and lentils, or generally pulse), for livestock forage and silage, and as soil-enhancing green manure.

== Legume dishes ==
=== 0–9 ===
- 15 Bean Soup – Packaged dry bean soup product from N.K. Hurst

=== A ===
- Acarajé – Deep-fried bean cake
- Aloo mutter – North Indian dish
- Amanattō – Japanese traditional confectionery
- Arroz con gandules – Puerto Rican rice and pork dish

=== B ===
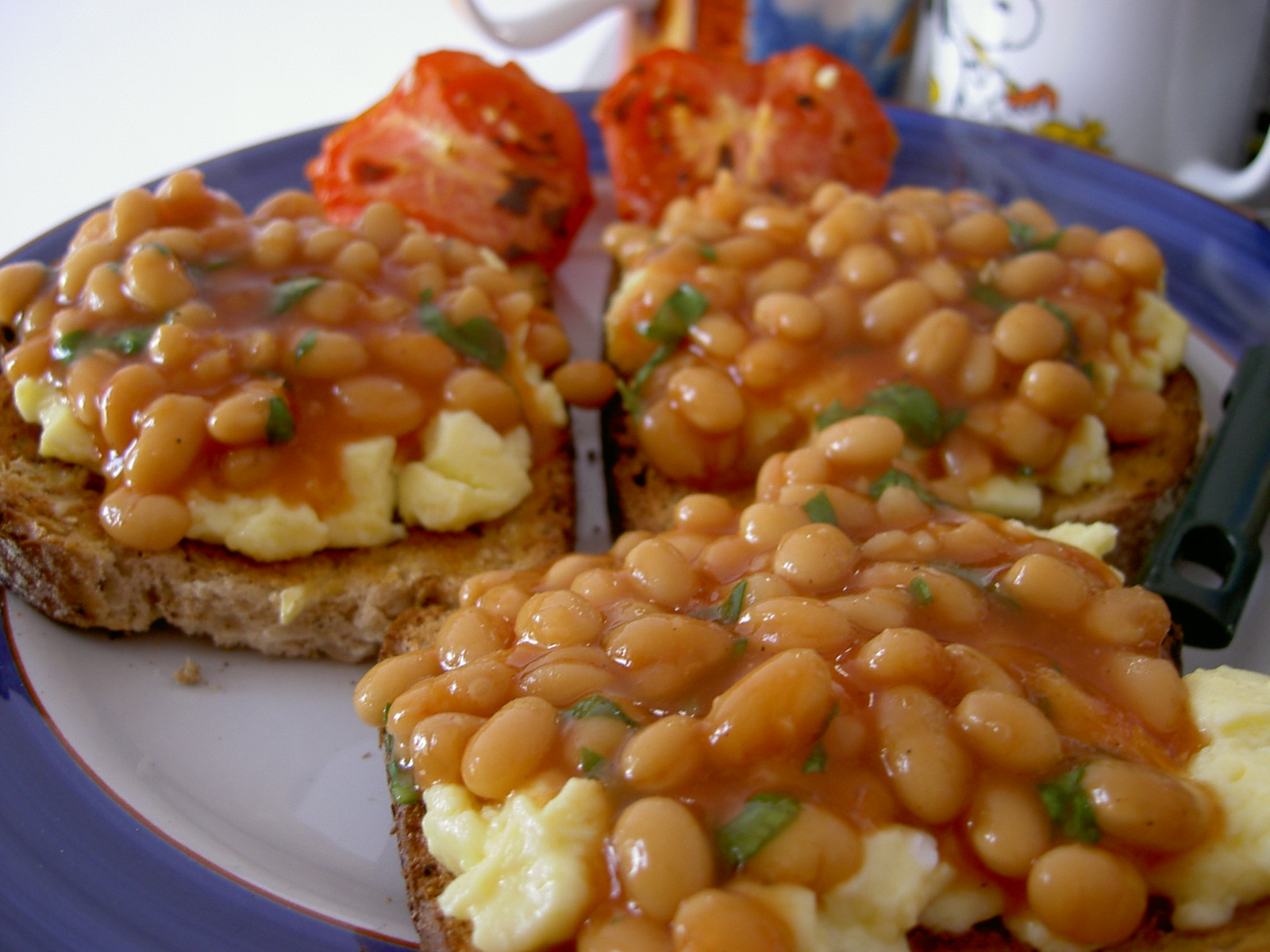
Baked beans over scrambled eggs on toast

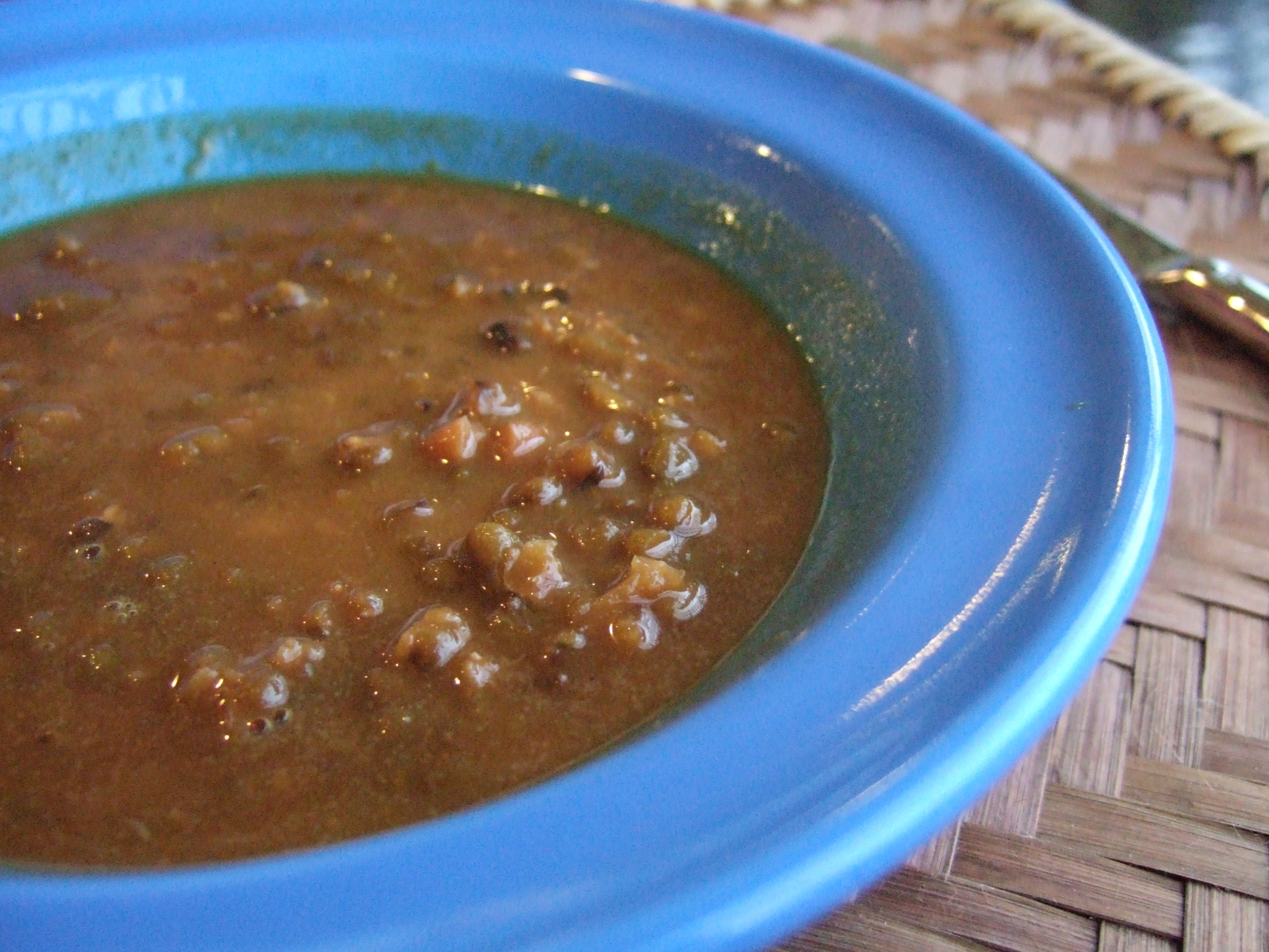
Bubur kacang hijau is an Indonesian and Malaysian sweet dessert made from mung beans porridge with coconut milk and palm sugar or cane sugar.

- Baked beans – Cooked beans in a seasoned sauce
- Balila (dish) – Levantine dish
- Bandeja paisa – Typical meal popular in Colombian cuisine
- Bap (food) – Korean name for cooked rice
- Beans – Seed of several plants in the legume family
- Bean chips – Snack food
- Bean dip – Type of dipping sauce
- Bean pie – Sweet custard pie
- Bean salad – Common cold salad composed of various cooked or pickled beans
- Bhadmaas – Legume grown for its edible bean
- Bigilla – Maltese dish made with beans
- Bissara – North African dish
- Black peas – Traditional Lancashire dish
- Bob chorba – Bulgarian bean soup
- Bodi ko Achar
- Boiled peanuts – Method of preparing fresh peanuts as a snack food
- Borracho beans – Bean dish from Mexico and southern Texas
- Bouneschlupp – European bean soup
- Bubur kacang hijau – Indonesian dessert
- Budae-jjigae – South Korean spicy stew
- Burmese tofu – Chickpea-based food item

=== C ===
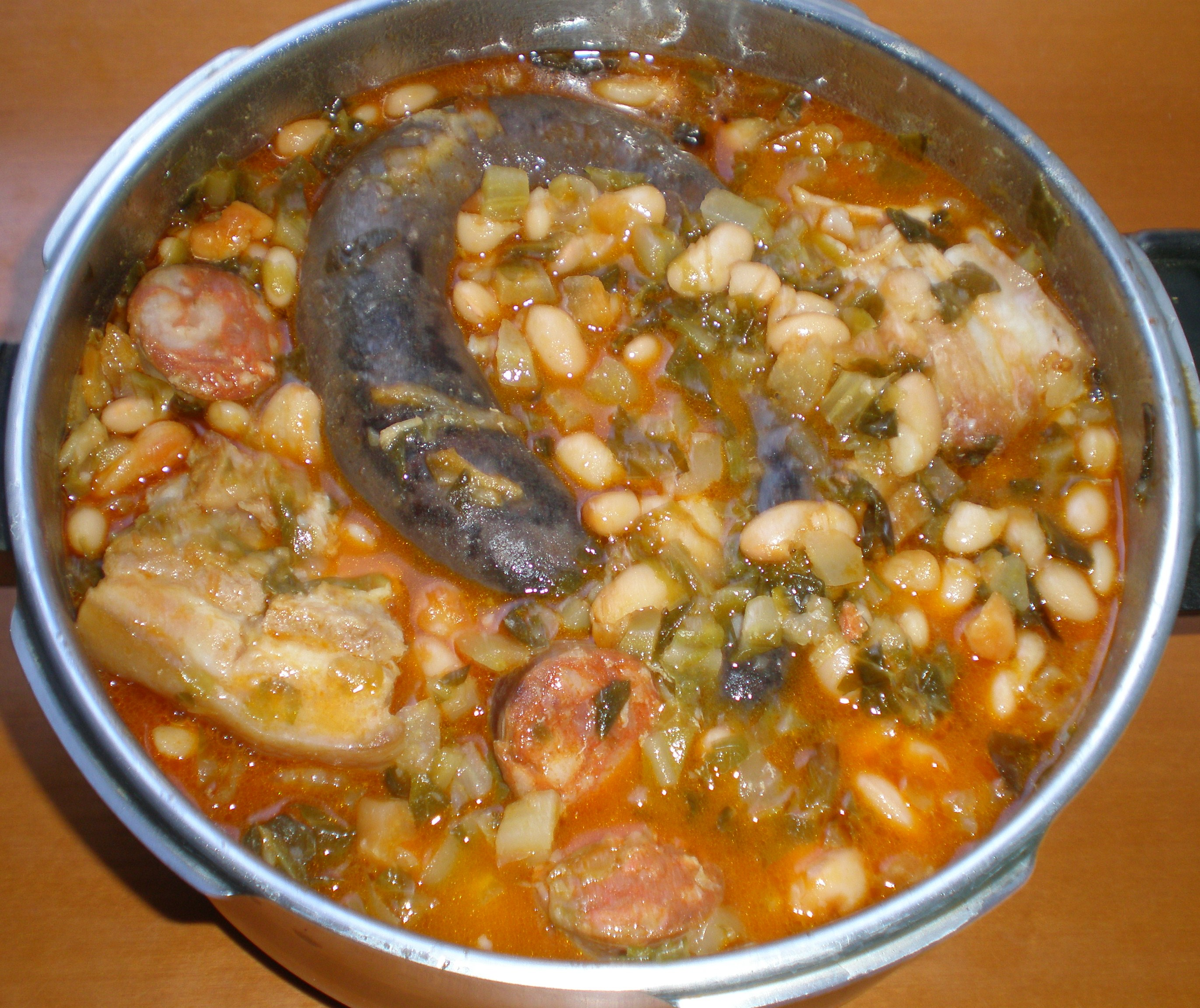
Cocido montañés (Highlander stew or Mountain stew) is a rich hearty bean stew, originally from and most commonly found in Cantabria in northern Spain.

- Callos
- Caparrones
- Cassoulet
- Chana masala
- Chapea
- Cholent
- Chili con carne
- Chole bhature
- Ciceri e Tria
- Cocido lebaniego
- Cocido madrileño
- Cocido Montañés
- Cowboy beans

=== D ===
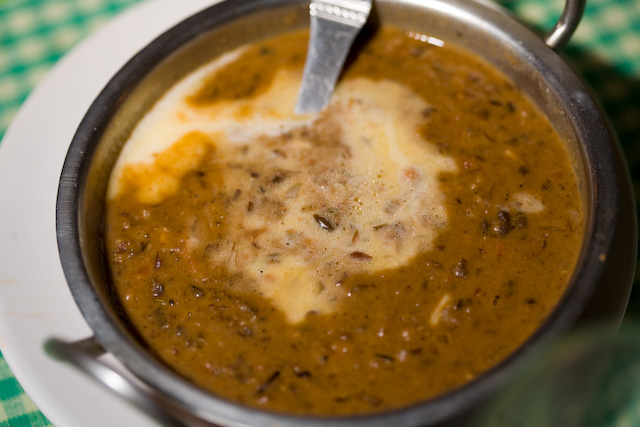
Dal makhani is a staple food originating from the Punjab region of the Indian subcontinent.

- Dal – Dried, split pulses used for cooking
- Dal baati – Indian dish of lentils and unleavened bread
- Dal bhat – Lentil & rice dish from South Asia
- Dalcha – Indian culinary dish
- Deep-fried peanuts
- Dhansak – Parsi curry
- Dhokla – Indian vegetarian dish
- Dilly beans – Pickled green beans, often flavoured with dill
- Doubles (food) – Indo-Caribbean street food originating in Trinidad and Tobago
- Douzhi – Fermented beverage made from mung beans

=== E ===
- Edamame – Immature soybean pod used as a specialty food

=== F ===
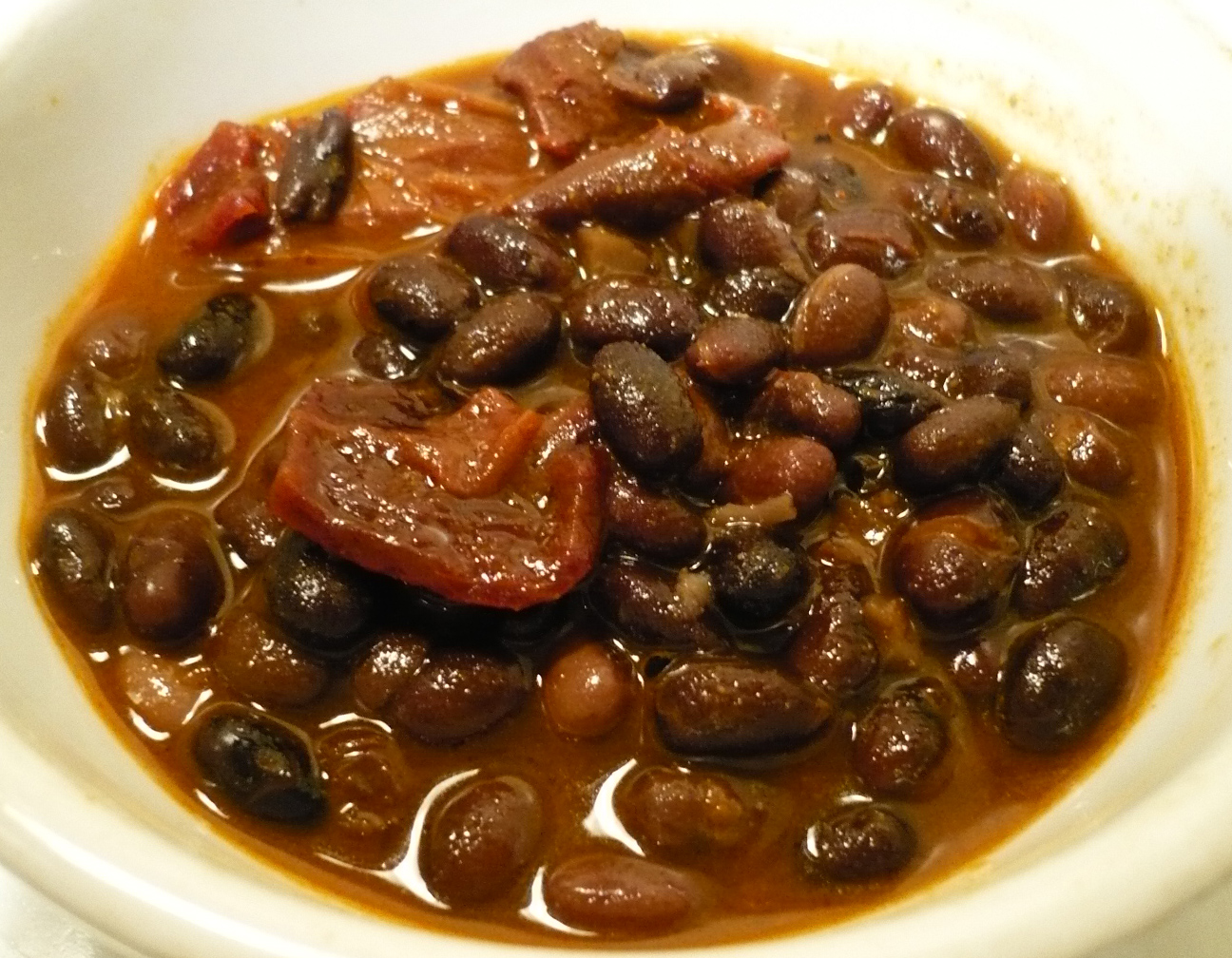
A bowl of Mexican-style vegetarian frijoles negros

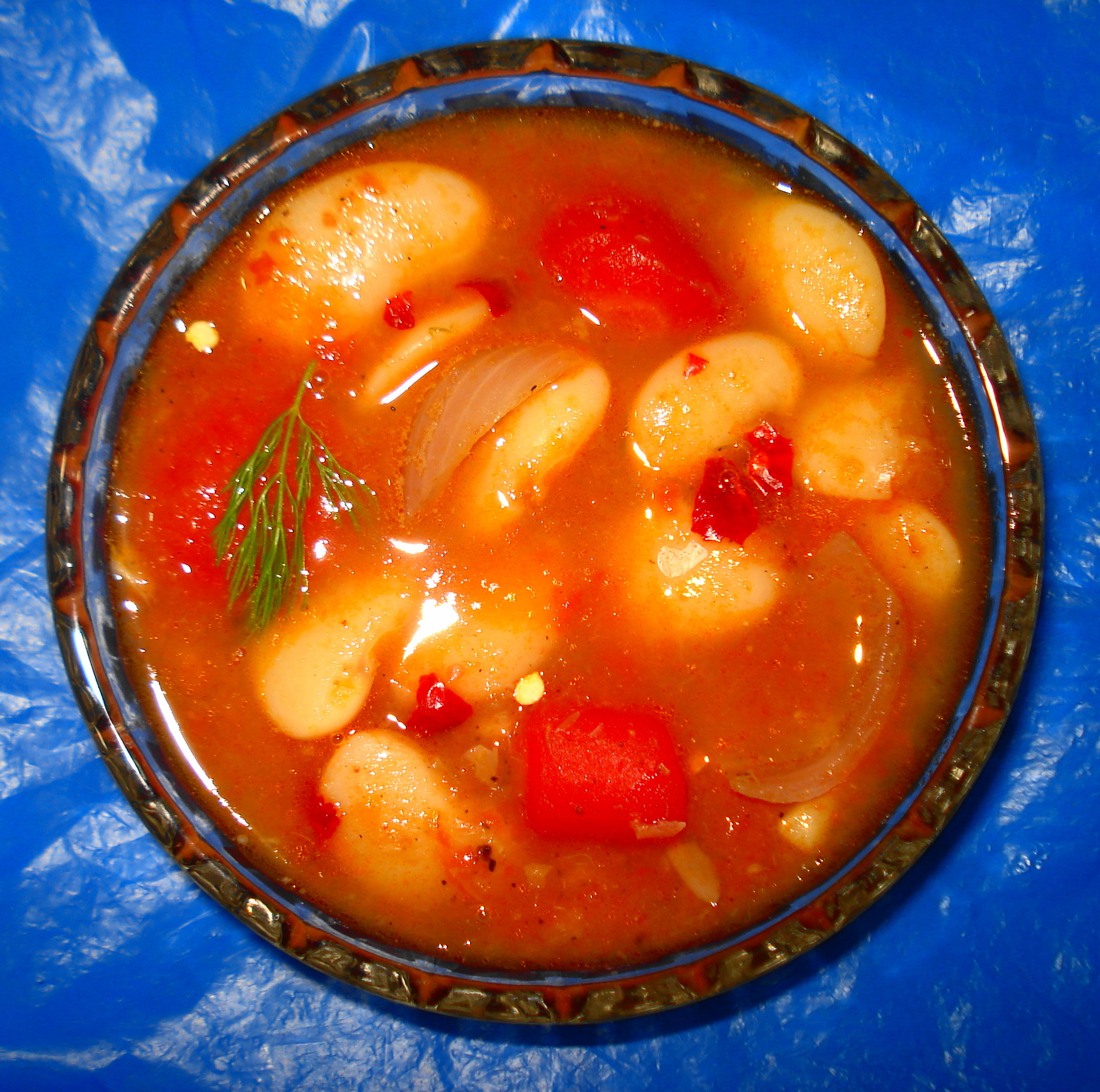
Fasolada is a Greek and Cypriot soup of dry white beans, olive oil, and vegetables as peppers, sometimes called the "national food of the Greeks".

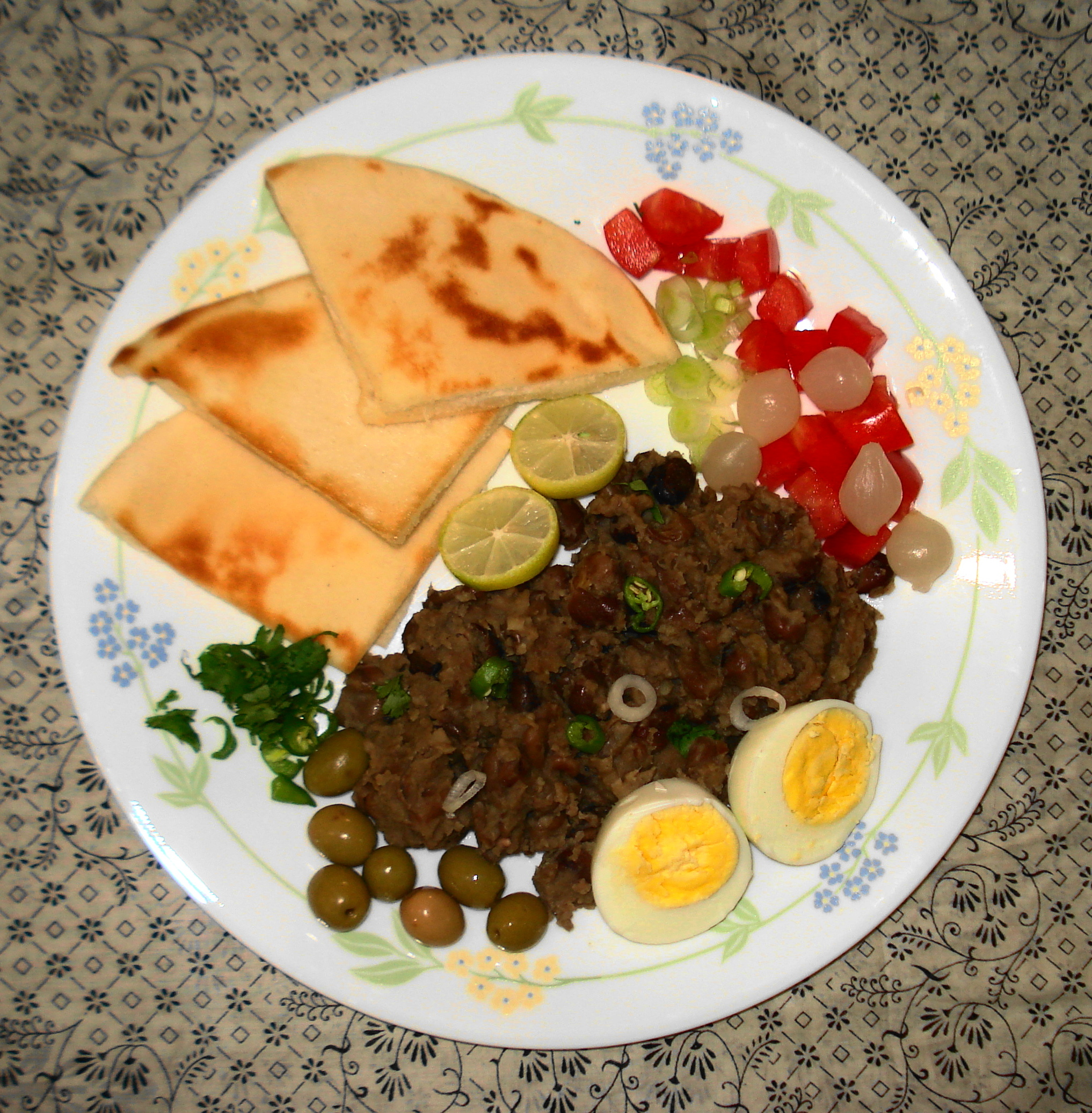
Ful medames is a Middle Eastern dish made of whole, or mashed, fava beans mixed with lemon juice and olive oil. Sometimes served with onions, olives, cumin, chili pepper, or other condiments.

- Fabada asturiana – Asturian bean stew
- Fabes con almejas – Stew originating in northwest Spain
- Falafel – Middle Eastern fried bean dish
- Farinata – Chickpea pancake
- Fasolada – Mediterranean kind of soup
- Fasole cu cârnaţi – Romanian dish
- Feijoada – Pork and bean stew found throughout the Lusophony
- Feijão tropeiro — Brazilian bean dish
- Frijoles charros – Mexican pinto bean dish
- Frijoles negros – Latin American black bean dish
- Ful medames – Egyptian dish of cooked fava beans

=== G ===
- Gallo pinto – Traditional dish from Central America
- Garnache – Mesoamerican dish
- Ghugni – Indian snack
- Gigandes plaki – Greek bean dish
- Githeri – Kenyan traditional meal
- Green bean casserole – American dish from the 1950s
- Grey peas – Latvian food
- Guernsey Bean Jar – Local dish of Guernsey

=== H ===
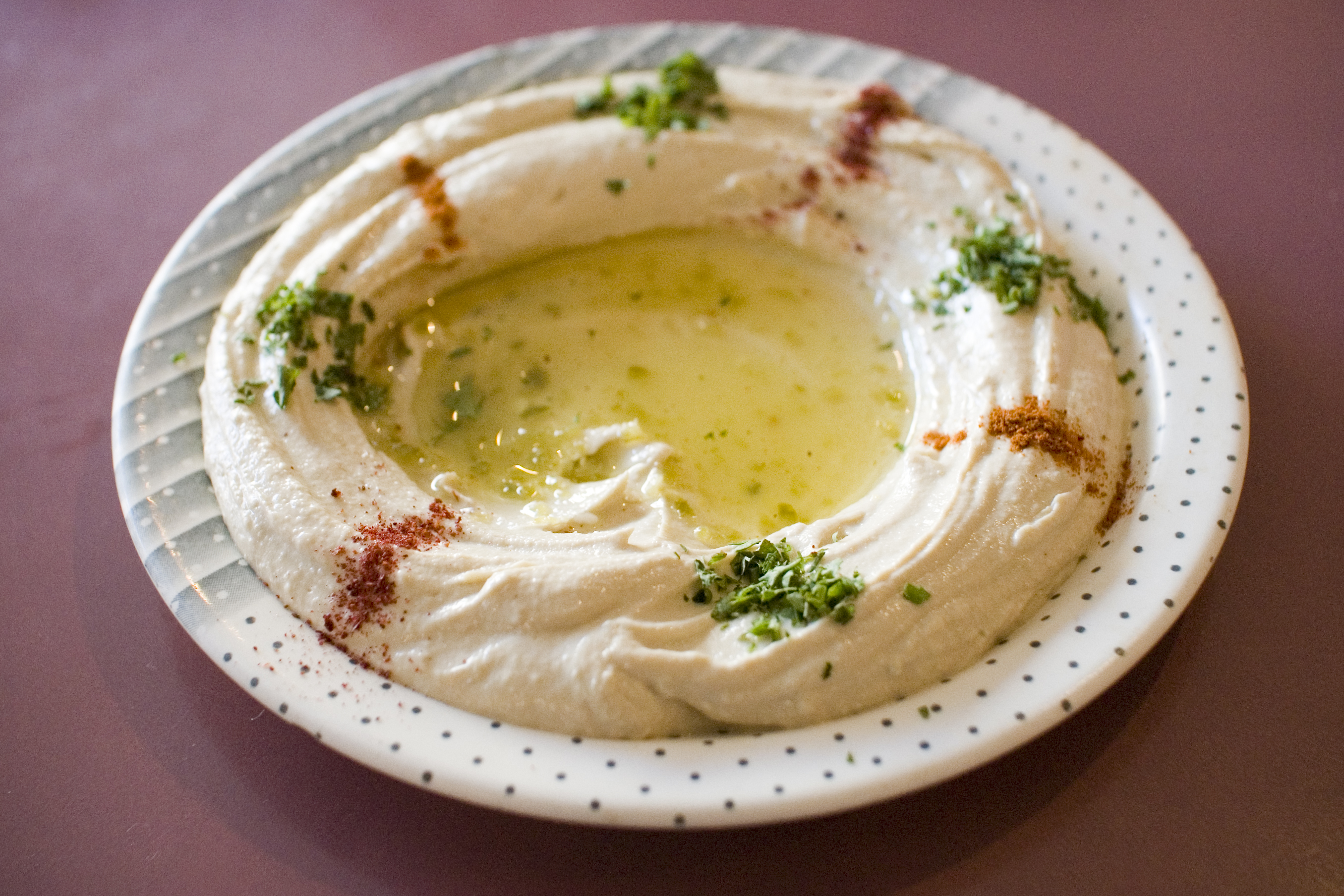
Hummus is a Middle Eastern and Arabic food dip or spread made from cooked, mashed chickpeas blended with tahini, olive oil, lemon juice, salt and garlic.

- Hoppin' John – Southern peas and rice dish
- Hummus – Middle Eastern chickpea puree dish

=== J ===
- Jidou liangfen – Chinese jelly made of mung bean starch
- Judd mat Gaardebounen – Savory dish from Luxembourg

=== K ===
- Kluklu – Nigerian snack made from peanut
- Kongbap – Korean rice dish with soybeans
- Koottu – Lentil and vegetable stew from India
- Kosambari – Seasoned split pulses salad
- Kuli-kuli – Nigerian snack made from peanut
- Kuru fasulye – Turkish bean stew
- Kuzhambu – Tamil vegetable side dish
- Kwati (soup) – Nepali bean soup

=== L ===
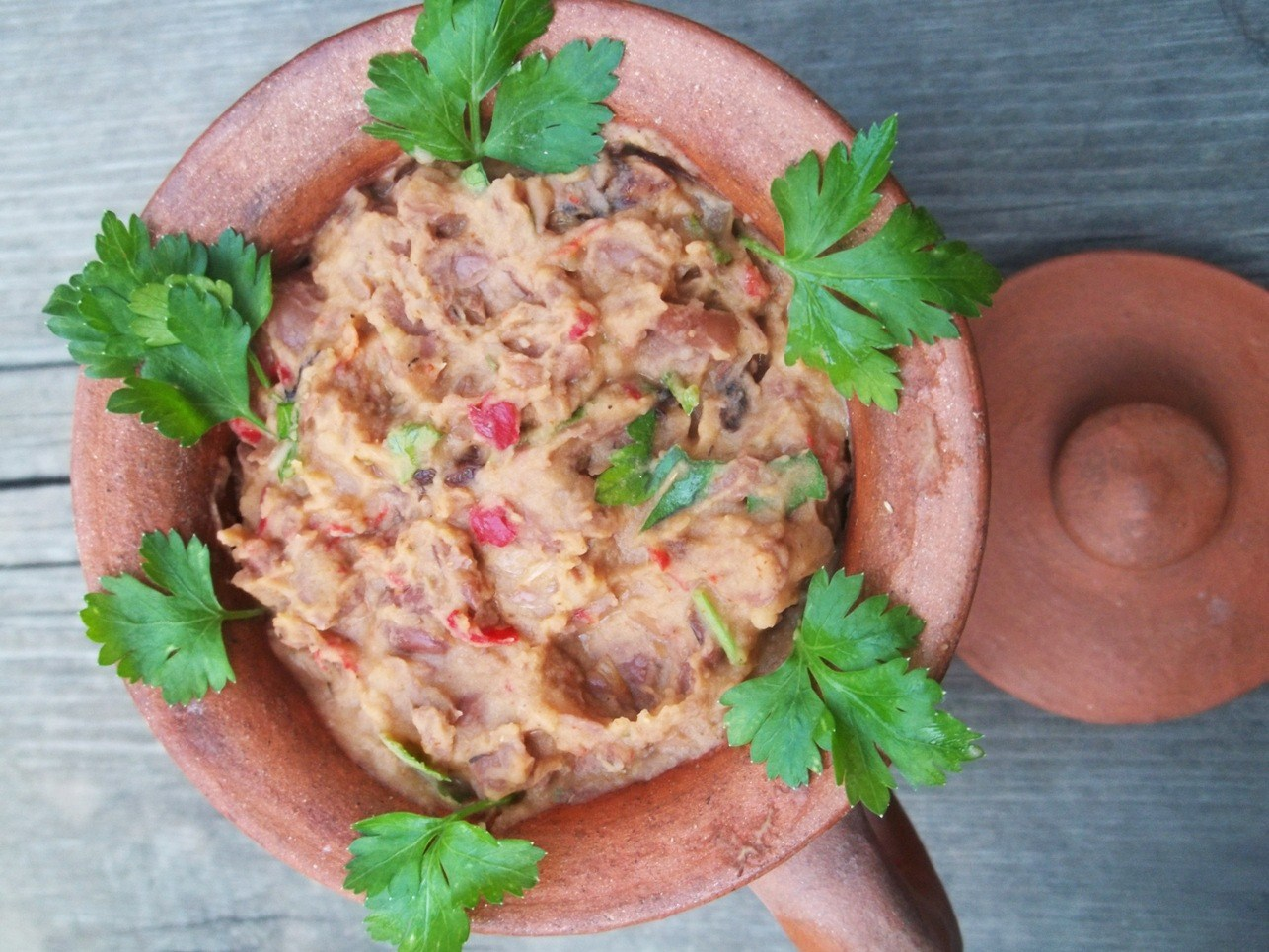
Lobio is a family of dishes of various kinds of prepared beans (cooked or stewed), containing coriander, walnuts, garlic and onion, popular item in the cuisines of the South Caucasus nation of Georgia.

- Lablabi – Tunisian dish based on chickpeas
- Laping – Tibetan noodle dish
- Lentil soup
- Liangfen – Chinese jelly made of mung bean starch
- Lobio – Traditional Georgian stew

=== M ===
- Marrowfat peas – Green peas that have dried out naturally
- Matevž – Potato and bean purée from Slovenia
- Mattar paneer – Indian cheese and peas dish
- Mercimek köftesi – Turkish cold dish (or meze) of "balls" of boiled red lentils, bulgur, green onions etc
- Minestrone – Thick soup of Italian origin
- Moro de guandules – Dish common in the Dominican Republic and Puerto Rico
- Moros y Cristianos – Cuban rice and pea dish
- Msabbaha – Variation of hummus
- Mujaddara – Dish of lentils, rice and sautéed onions
- Murukku – Traditional snack of South India
- Mushy peas – Thick green lumpy mash of peas

=== N ===
- Nokdumuk – Korean mung bean jelly

=== O ===
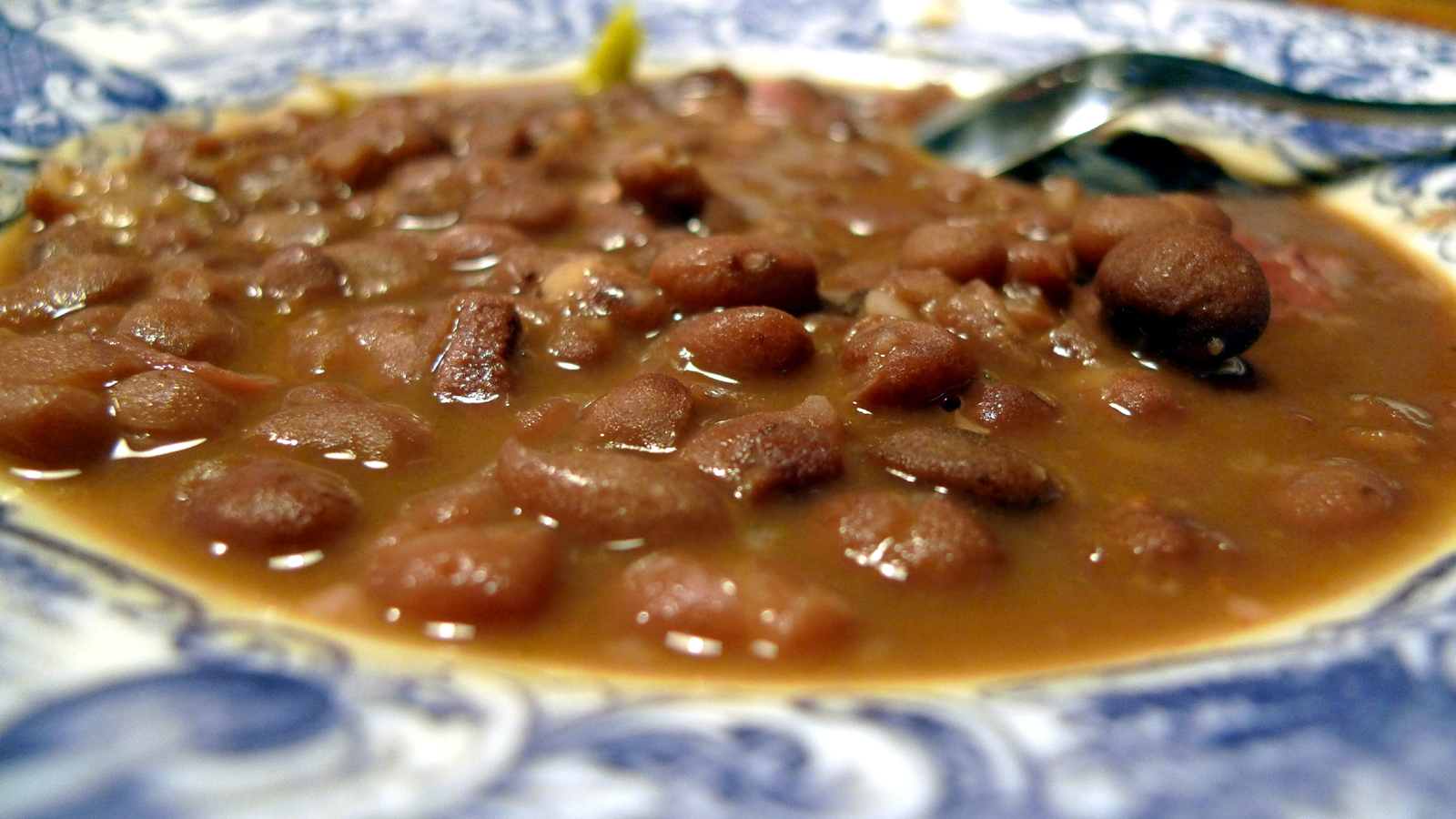
Olla podrida is a Spanish stew made from pork and beans and an inconsistent, wide variety of other meats and vegetables.

- Olla podrida – Spanish stew made with chickpeas and beans

=== P ===
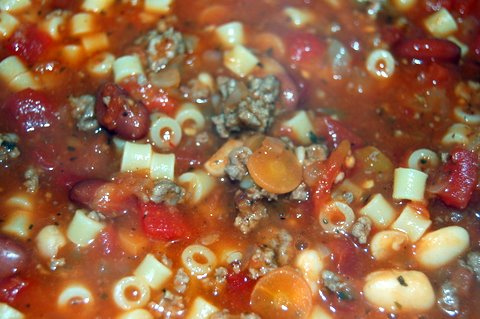
Pasta e fagioli, meaning "pasta and beans", is a traditional meatless Italian dish.

- Pabellón criollo – Traditional Venezuelan rice and bean dish
- Panelle – Sicilian fritter
- Papadum – Flatbread from the Indian subcontinent
- Paripu – Dried, split pulses used for cooking
- Pasta e fagioli – Italian pasta soup
- Pastizz – Savoury pastry from Malta
- Pasulj – Bean stew
- Peabutter – Savory spread
- Peas with salo
- Pease pudding – Savoury pudding dish made of boiled legumes
- Pie and peas – British dish
- Piyaz – Turkish and Persian cuisine
- Pie floater – Australian meat pie and soup dish
- Pokhemma
- Pork and beans – Culinary dish
- Porotos con rienda – Chilean dish
- Purtumute

=== R ===
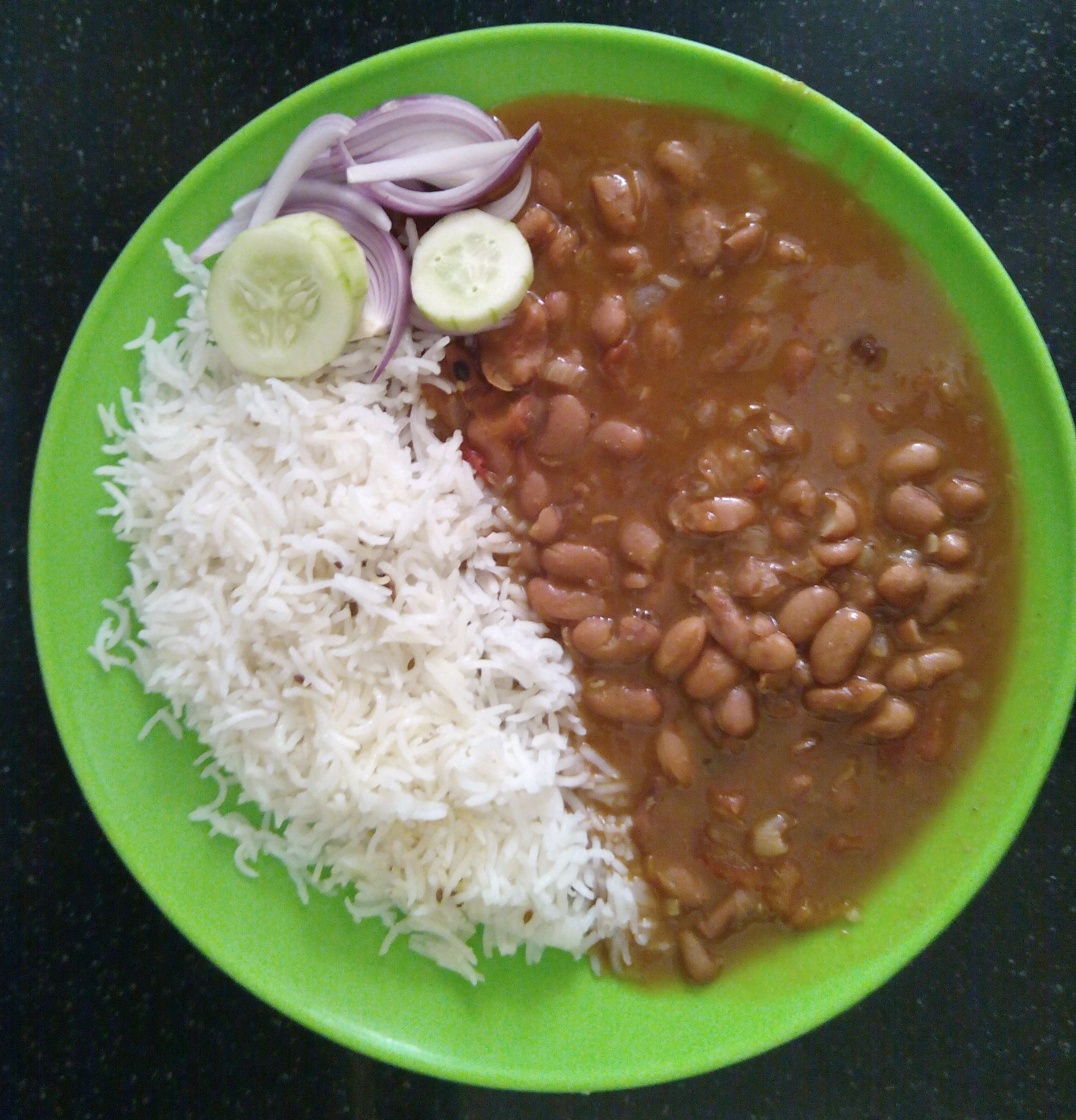
Rajma chawal, Rajma beans served with boiled rice, from the Indian subcontinent

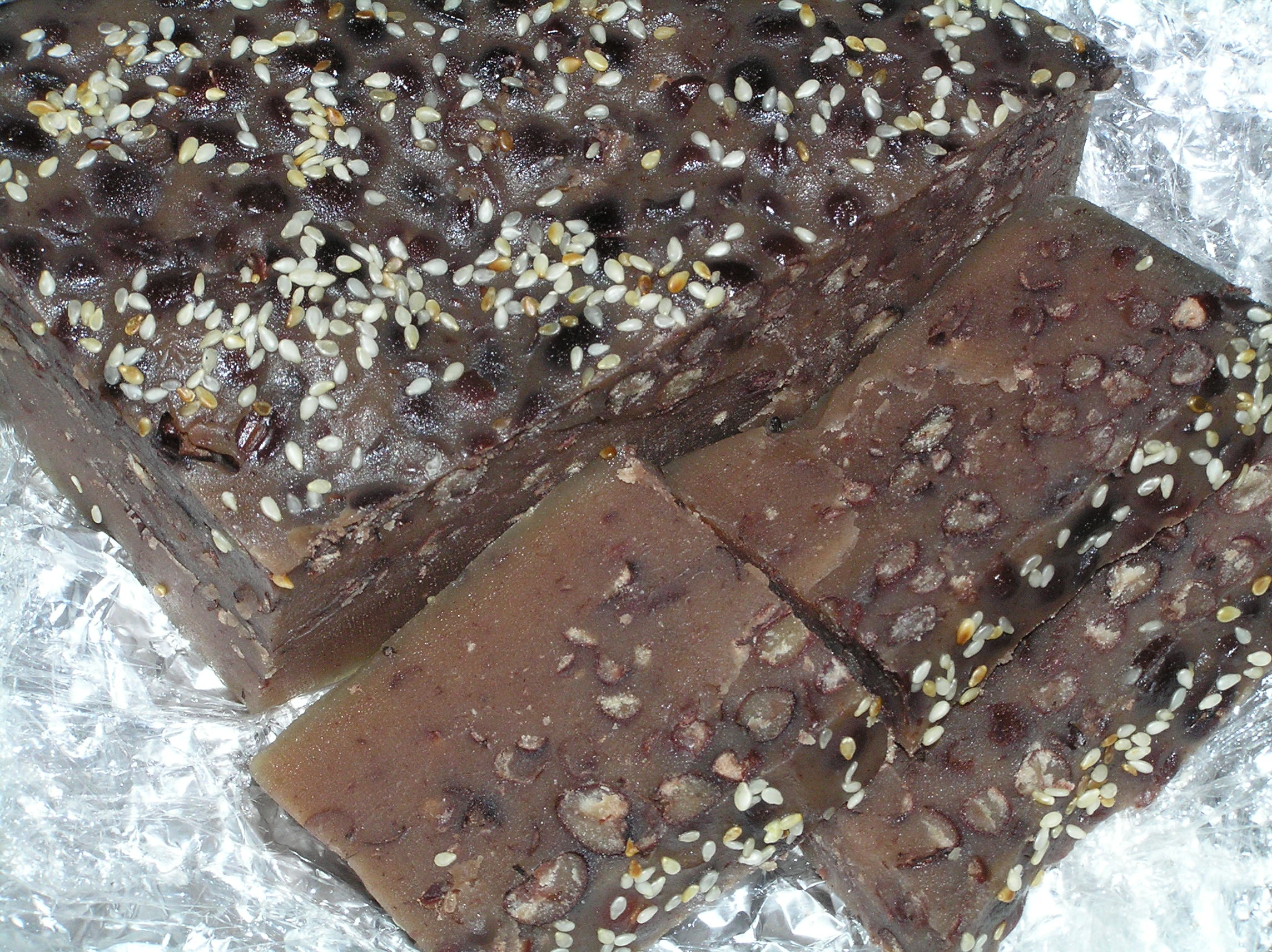
Red bean cake is a type of Chinese cake with a sweet red bean paste filling. It is made primarily with azuki beans.

- Ragda pattice – Popular Indian street food
- Rajma – Red kidney beans dish, originating from the Indian subcontinent
- Red bean cake – Cake with red bean paste filling
- Red bean ice – Drink commonly found in Hong Kong
- Red bean paste – Paste made from adzuki beans
- Red bean soup – Chinese sweet dessert soup
- Red beans and rice – Dish characteristic of Louisiana Creole cuisine
- Refried beans – Mexican dish of cooked mashed beans
- Revalenta arabica
- Rice and beans – Type of dish made from a combination of staple foods in many cultures around the world
- Rice and peas – Traditional Caribbean food

=== S ===
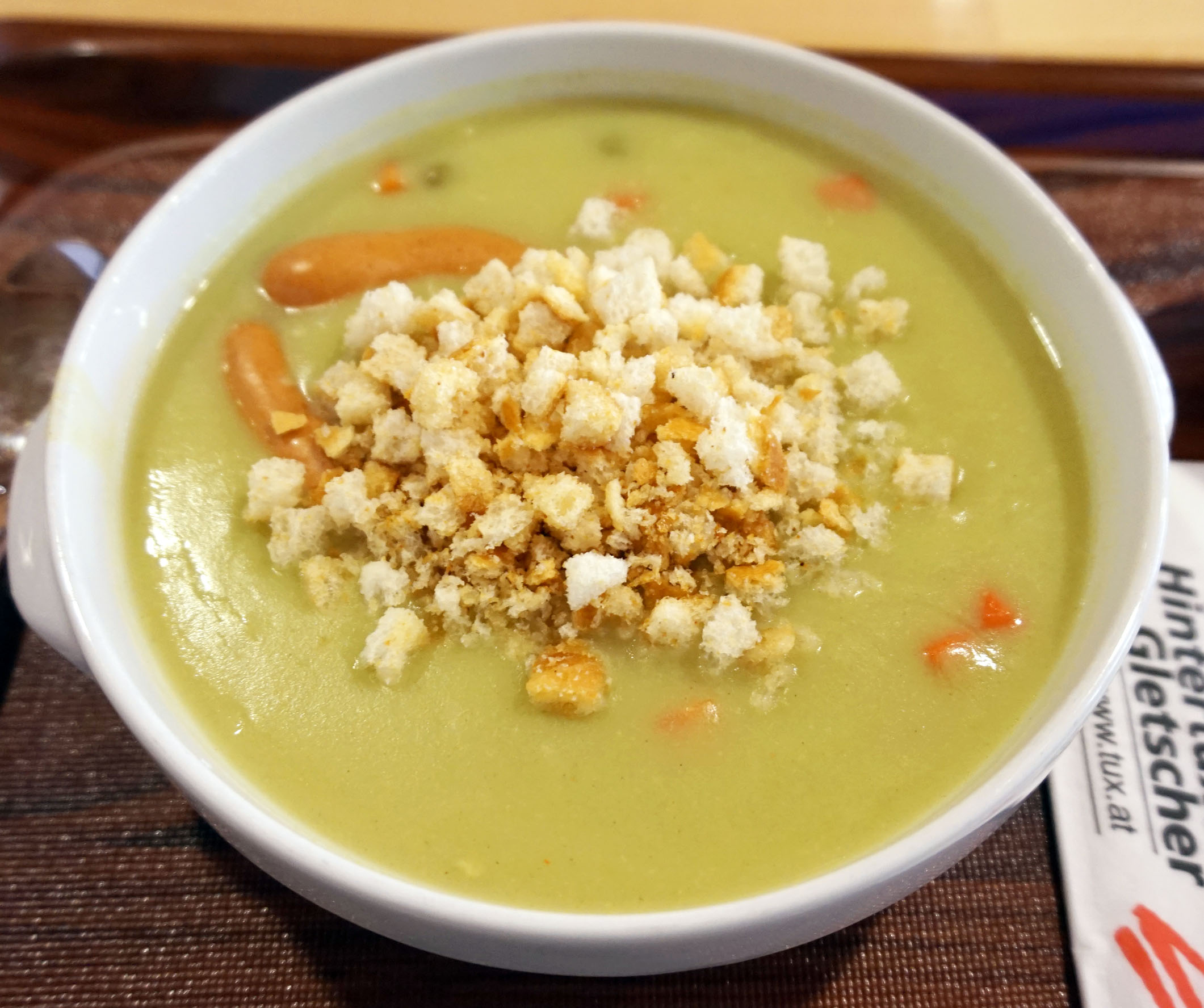
Split pea soup is typically prepared with dried peas, such as the split pea. It is, with variations, a part of the cuisine of many cultures.

- Sambar – Lentil stew
- Senate bean soup – Soup served in the United States Senate
- Shahan ful – Dish in Sudan, Somaila, Ethiopia and Horn of Africa
- Shiro – Powdered stew from Ethiopia and Eritrea
- Socca (food) – Chickpea pancake from Provence, France
- Soup beans – Southern United States bean dish
- Split pea soup – Soup made from dried peas
- Succotash – Traditional American food

=== T ===
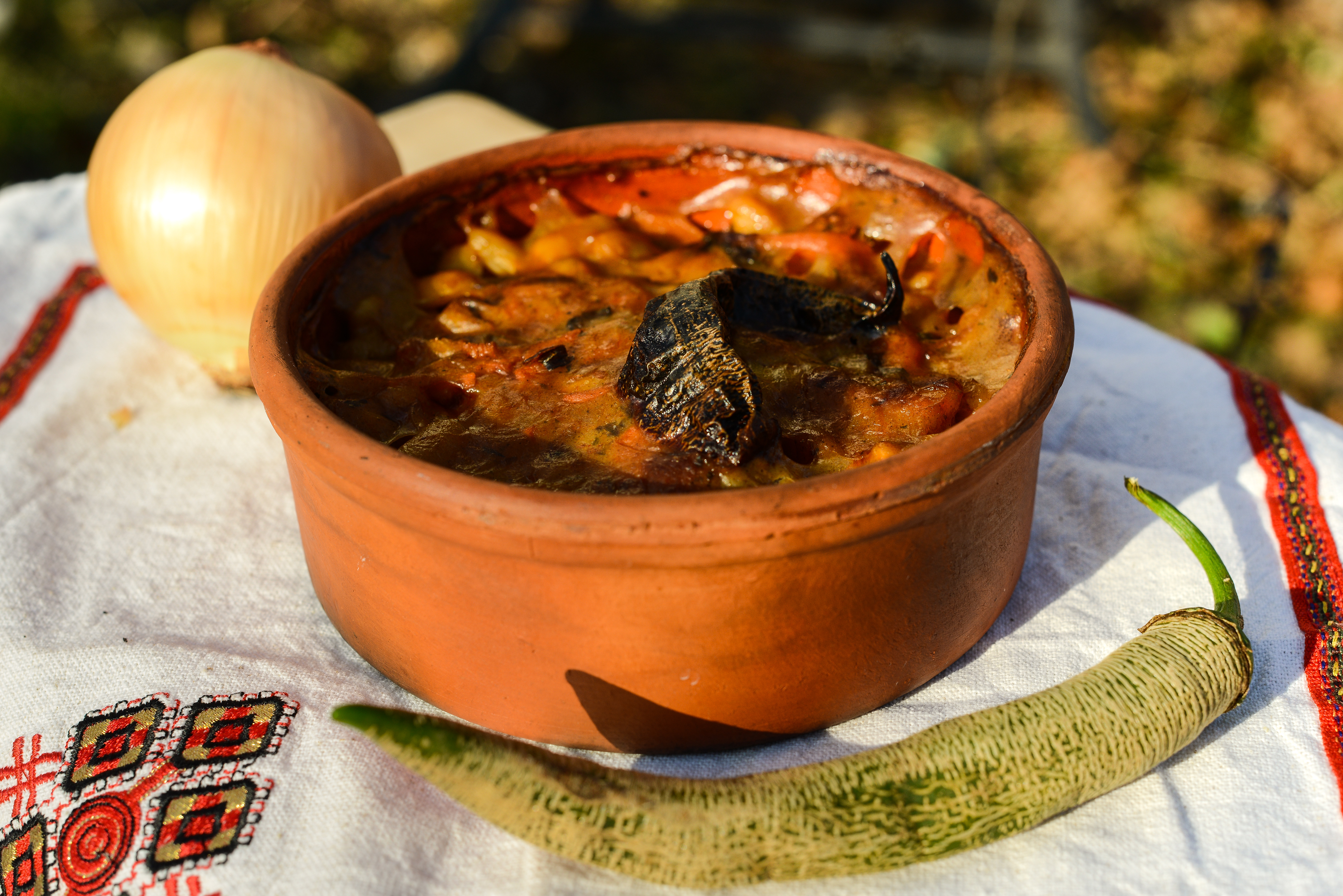
Tavče gravče is a traditional Macedonian dish. It is prepared with fresh beans and it can be found in almost all restaurants in Macedonia and all over the Greek and Macedonian diaspora.

- Tavče gravče – Traditional Macedonian dish
- Texas caviar – American bean salad dish
- Tomato omelette – Indian breakfast dish prepared mostly in Maharashtra
- Tortillitas de camarones – Shrimp fritters

=== U ===
- Ulava charu – Spicy and tangy lentil dish
- Umngqusho – South African dish

=== V ===
- Vegetarian chili – Savory American stew with chili peppers and meat

=== W ===
- Waakye – Ghanaian food
- Wandouhuang – Traditional Chinese snack food

=== Y ===
- Yōkan – Type of wagashi
- Yun dou juan – Traditional Chinese dish

== See also ==
- Common bean
- Pakistani legume dishes
- List of bean soups
- List of chickpea dishes
- List of edible seeds
- List of peanut dishes
- List of foods
- List of soups
- List of soy-based foods
- List of vegetable dishes
