= Hodmedod =

Hodmedod may refer to:

- A scarecrow (Berkshire dialect term)
- A snail (British dialect)
- A hedgehog (Norfolk dialect)
- Hodmedod's, formal name Hodmedod Ltd, British food retailer and producer
