= Black peas =

Traditional Lancashire dish

Black peas, also called parched peas or dapple peas, are cooked purple-podded peas (Pisum sativum var. arvense). They are a traditional Lancashire dish usually served with lashings of malt vinegar, and traditionally on or around Bonfire Night (5 November). The dish is popular in Bury, Preston, Rochdale, Oldham, Wigan, Bolton, Atherton, Tyldesley, Leigh and Heywood. The dried peas are soaked overnight and simmered to produce a type of mushy pea. Parching was a term for long slow boiling.

The peas are field peas, left to dry on the plant, as distinct from garden peas, picked green for fresh consumption. The Carlin pea, a different variety prepared in similar ways and also eaten in the north of England, dates back to the 12th century. It is said that Martin Frobisher buried caches of these peas on Baffin Island in the 1570s to sustain his expedition while seeking the Northwest Passage.

== Consumption ==
Cooked black peas are commonly sold at fairgrounds and mobile food counters. They are traditionally eaten from a cup with salt and vinegar. They can be served hot or cold, the former being especially popular in the winter months. At fairgrounds, they were traditionally served in white porcelain mugs and eaten with a spoon. In more recent years, they have been served in thick white disposable cups. In the "world famous" Bury Market and in Preston, parched peas are sold ready-cooked and served in brown-paper bags or in plastic tubs, as an autumn delicacy. They are also sold at the Manchester Christmas markets.

Consumption is limited to certain areas within the historical boundaries of Lancashire, notably Oldham, Wigan, Bury, Rochdale, Preston, Stalybridge, Leigh, Atherton, Tyldesley, Ormskirk, and Bolton.

== Carlin peas ==
Carlin peas, also known as carling, maple, brown or pigeon peas (but distinct from the tropical pigeon pea Cajanus cajan), and black or grey badgers, are small, hard brown peas, first recorded during Elizabethan times. It has been suggested that the name "Carlin" comes from "Carling Sunday" or "Care Sunday" after the population of Newcastle were saved from starvation in a siege of 1327 or 1644 when a ship arrived from Norway with a cargo of these peas on that day.

They are classed as a heritage or heirloom variety, often referred to as the medieval mushy pea. They can be grown in the same way as sweet peas. The plants grow to about six feet high, with white and purple flowers. The pods fill with small brown peas which can be used fresh, or dried.

Carlin peas are used to prepare a dish made in the northeast of England and parts of Cumbria. They are a traditional staple of Carlin Sunday (the Sunday before Palm Sunday). Carlin peas are boiled until tender, then fried briefly with butter or dripping. Salt is not added during cooking, as it is thought to stop the cooking process. They are then seasoned with vinegar and black pepper or sometimes rum and brown sugar. They may be eaten hot or cold.

A children's rhyme counts out the Sundays of Lent as "Tid, Mid, Misere; Carlin, Palm, Paste-Egg Day", referring to the second Sunday when "Te Deum" was sung; the third when "Mi Deus" was sung; the Sunday when the "Misere Mei" was chanted; Carlin Sunday; Palm Sunday; and Pace Eggs on Easter Sunday.

Carlins are low in fat, and have 23g per 100g of protein and of fibre. They contain manganese, molybdenum and B vitamins, especially B1. Their red/blue colour derives from anthocyanins, which have desirable nutritional properties.

== Availability ==
The availability of black peas is seasonal; they are typically available from the end of October and throughout November. They are available from local stores and also pet shops (as the peas are a good carp bait) although peas from pet shops are not necessarily food-grade.

Carlin peas are not widely available in British shops, but are sometimes available in health food shops. They can be bought for home preparation in at least two varieties, "Red Fox" and "Black Badger", and the latter are available tinned in water. This product, from Hodmedod's, won the Soil Association's BOOM Award 2016 as winner of "Store cupboard items" and overall winner in the "Pantry" category.
