= Pasta e ceci =

Italian pasta dish

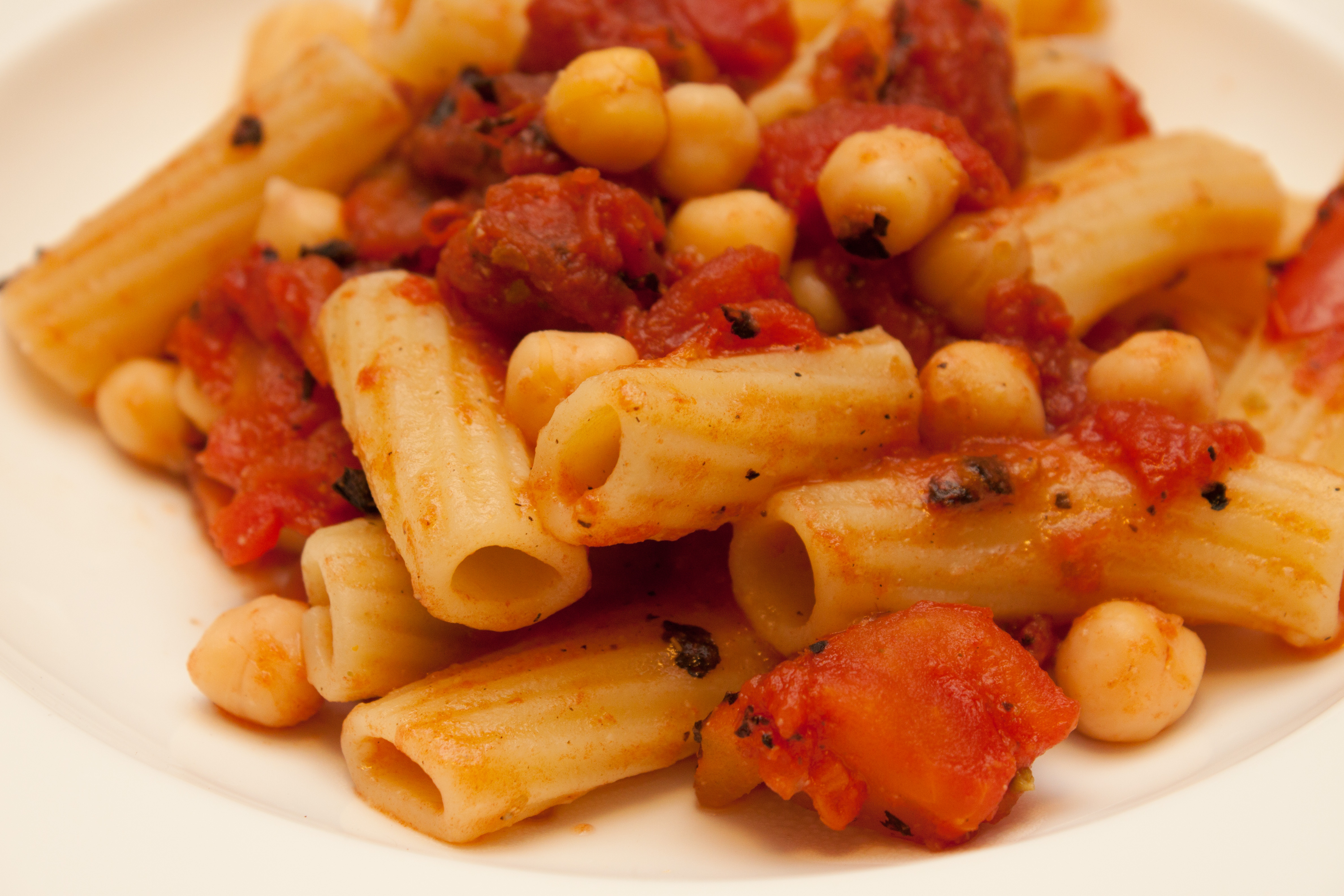
- Course: Primo (Italian course)
- Place of origin: Italy
- Region or state: Central and southern Italy
- Main ingredients: Pasta, chickpeas

Pasta e ceci (Italian: [ˈpasta e tˈtʃeːtʃi]; lit. 'pasta and chickpeas') is a pasta dish common in southern and central Italy prepared with pasta and chickpeas as primary ingredients. It is part of the cucina povera (Italian for 'cuisine of the poor'), or peasant cuisine tradition in Italian cuisine and has ancient origins, seen in a mention in the Roman poet Horace's Satires.

The dish is popular in the region of Basilicata, where it is known as pasta del brigante (lit. 'brigand's pasta'), as it is popularly believed to have been the favorite dish of local brigands in the nineteenth century. In Campania the dish is popular in the province of Salerno and in Cilento. The dish marks one of the few times in Campanian cooking that garlic is browned, here into a crunchy seasoning. This technique is particularly common in this dish in the region's mountainous areas.

The Roman version of the dish makes use of anchovies. In Apulia, the dish is known as ciceri e tria, a staple dish of the cuisine of Salento. The dish has been recognised by the Ministry of Agricultural, Food and Forestry Policies as a traditional Apulian product and is mentioned in the twenty-second revision of the list of products of 2020.

== See also ==
Media related to Pasta e ceci at Wikimedia Commons

- List of pasta
- List of pasta dishes
- Ciceri e tria
