= Ciceri e tria =

Italian pasta dish

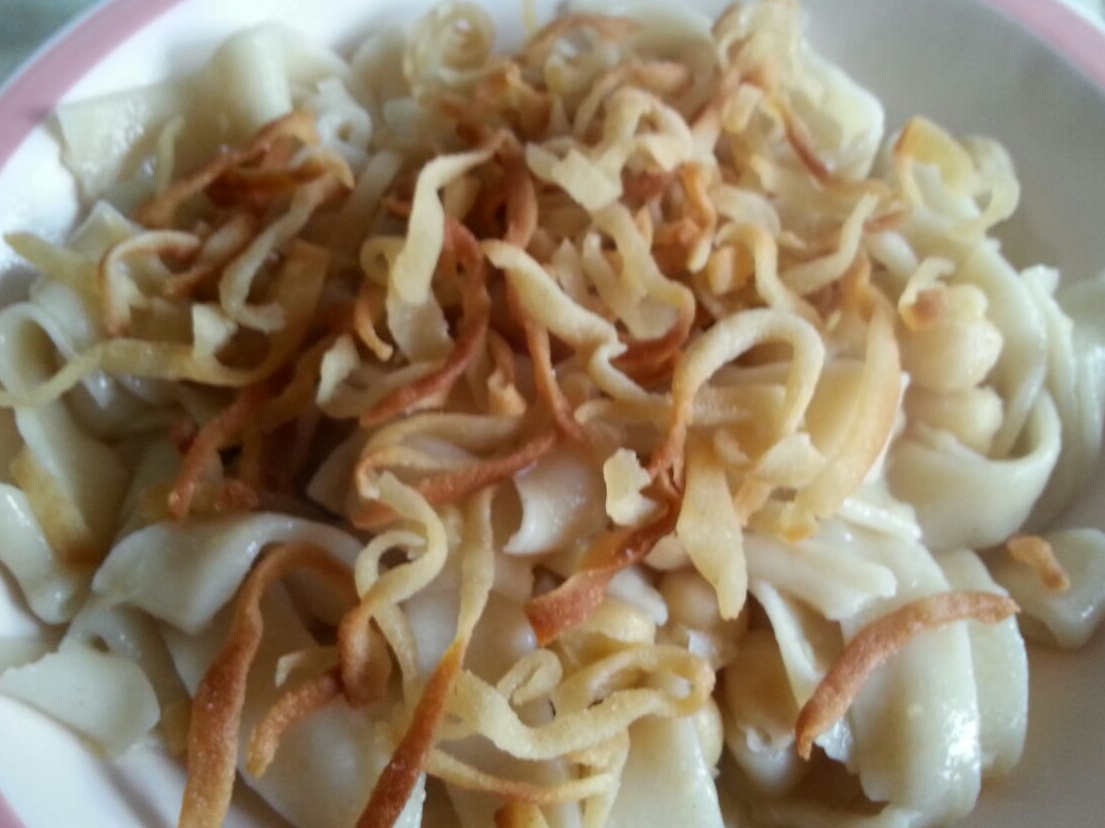
- Course: Primo (Italian course)
- Place of origin: Italy
- Region or state: Salento
- Main ingredients: Pasta, chickpeas

Ciceri e tria (Italian: [ˈtʃiːtʃeri e tˈtriːa]) is a pasta dish originating in the Salento region. It is prepared with pasta and chickpeas as the primary ingredients, and includes fried pasta. It has been described as a "classic and emblematic dish of Salentine cuisine" and as a specialty dish of Apulia.

== Etymology ==
Ciceri means 'chickpeas' in Latin. Tria, meaning 'pasta' or 'noodle', derives from an Arabic word for pasta, إطرية, iṭriyah (from the root طرو, ṭ-r-w, or طري, ṭ-r-y, 'to be fresh, moist, tender'). It means 'pasta' in the Genoese dialect. Tria is the name for a local ribbon shaped pasta, much less known than orecchiette or cavatelli but equally treasured by the Pugliesi. Made from semolina flour and water, tria is often translated as 'tagliatelle', but they are actually quite different.

== Ingredients and preparation ==
Pasta and chickpeas are the primary ingredients in ciceri e tria. Some versions of the dish may have a significant amount of broth, which may be eaten using a spoon. Some of the pasta (from one-third to one-half) is fried in oil as part of its preparation, while the rest of it is boiled. The use of fried pasta was originally performed to create a quality or mouthfeel of meatiness in the dish during times of meat scarcity. The fried pasta may also add crunchiness to the dish. Apulian versions may involve the chickpeas being simmered over a low heat while fresh pasta is being prepared. Dried or uncooked chickpeas may be soaked one day prior to preparation of the dish. Additional ingredients may include onion, carrot, celery, and garlic. It may be seasoned with black pepper. It has been described as having a bacon-like flavor.

== See also ==
Ciceri e Tria at the Wikibooks Cookbook subproject

- List of pasta
- List of pasta dishes
- List of legume dishes
- Pasta e ceci

== Sources ==
- Gade, H. W. (2003). The Digital Pasta Book 1 / Italian pasta. Vol. 1. NORDISC Music & Text. ISBN 8788619478.
- Anderson, Burton (2007). The Foods of Italy: An endless adventure in taste (5th ed.). Italian Trade Commission.
- Zanini De Vita, Oretta (2009). Encyclopedia of Pasta. University of California Press. p. 302. ISBN 978-0520944718.
- Guaiti, Daniela (2010). Puglia (in Italian). Edizioni Gribaudo. p. 48. ISBN 978-8879068390.
- Aggarwal, Uma (2013). America's Favorite Recipes, Part II: The Melting Pot Cuisine. iUniverse. ISBN 978-1475977868.
- Taylor, John Martin (2013). The Fearless Frying Cookbook. Workman Publishing Company. ISBN 978-0761172000.
