= Cowboy beans =

Popular dish in southwestern USA

Cowboy Beans
- Course: Main course
- Place of origin: United States
- Region or state: American Southwest
- Serving temperature: Hot
- Main ingredients: Beans (usually pinto, black-eyed), onion powder, ketchup, barbecue sauce, brown sugar, black pepper, milk, flour

Cowboy beans (also known as chuckwagon beans) is a bean dish. The dish consists of pinto beans and ground beef in a sweet and tangy sauce. Other types of meat can be used. A related dish using multiple different types of beans is called calico beans, due to the multiple colors of beans resembling the coat of a calico cat. The flavor is similar to baked beans but with a Northern twist. Although cowboy appears in the name, the use of canned beans, ketchup, and barbecue sauce means the dish is unlike anything ranch hands would have eaten in the 19th century. Cowboy beans are served stewed or baked, depending on the recipe.

It is unclear how cowboy beans got their name or where they originated. They are easy to prepare and variations on the recipe are available on the Internet and in cookbooks and cooking magazines.

== Ingredients ==
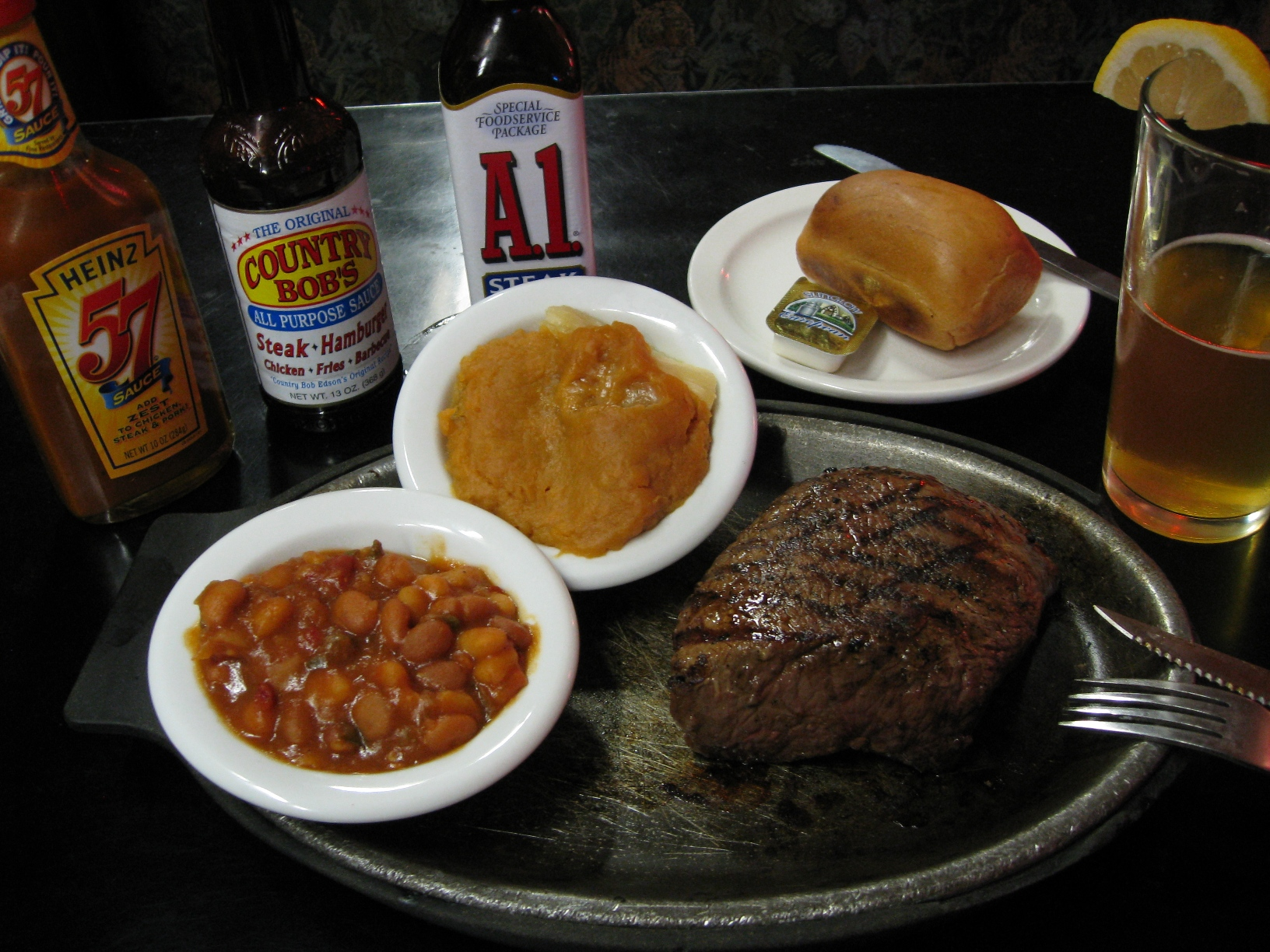
Cowboy beans (bottom-left) accompanying a steak dinner

A typical recipe might include:

- Pork and beans
- Ground beef
- Onion powder
- Black pepper
- Ketchup
- Barbecue sauce
- Brown sugar
- Milk
- Flour

== See also ==
- Borracho beans
- Frijoles charros
  - Texas caviar, sometimes called "cowboy caviar"
- List of legume dishes
