= Frijoles negros =

Latin American black bean dish

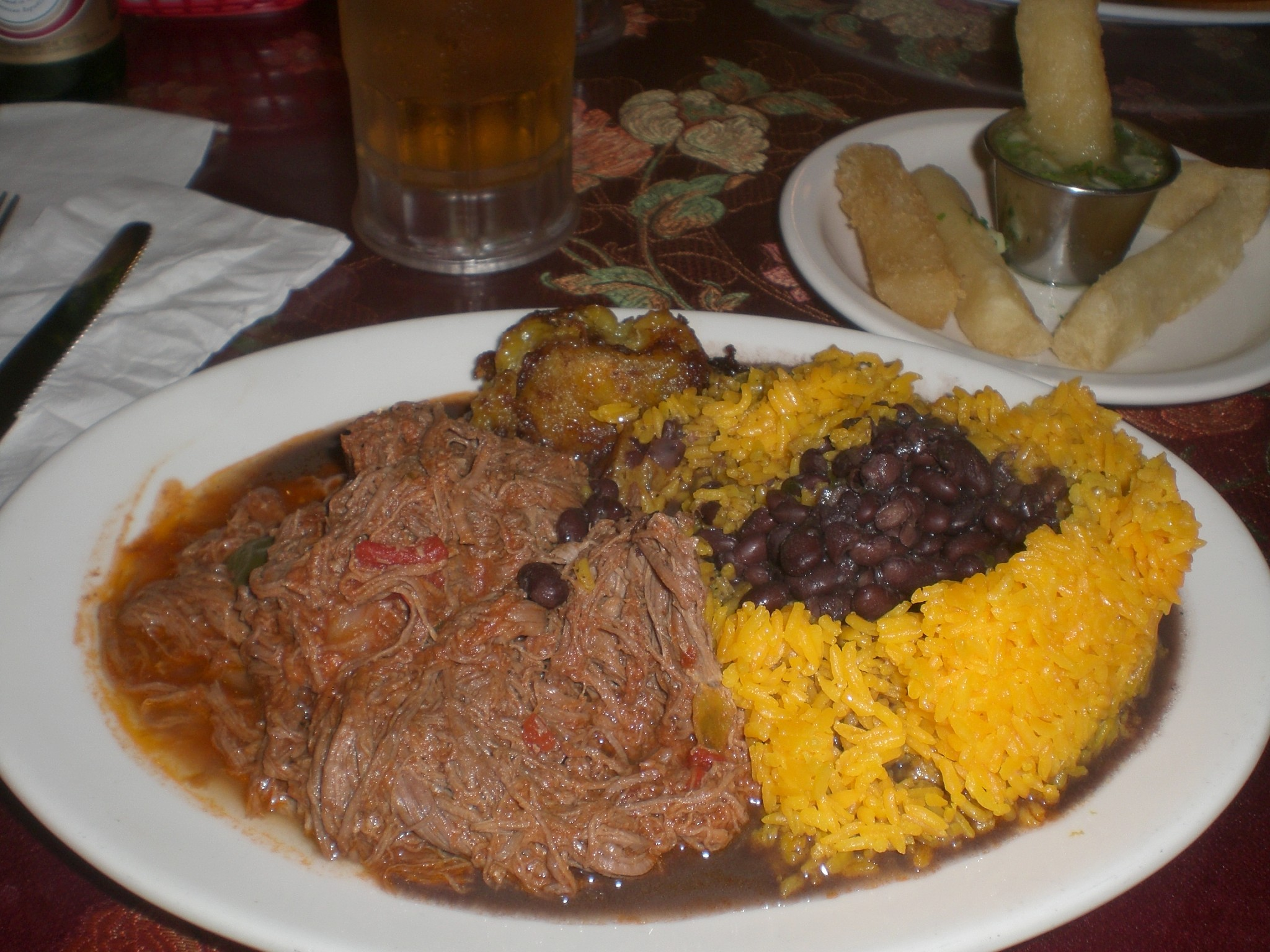
Authentic Cuban dish of ropa vieja (shredded flank steak in a tomato sauce base), black beans, yellow rice, plantains and fried yuca with beer.

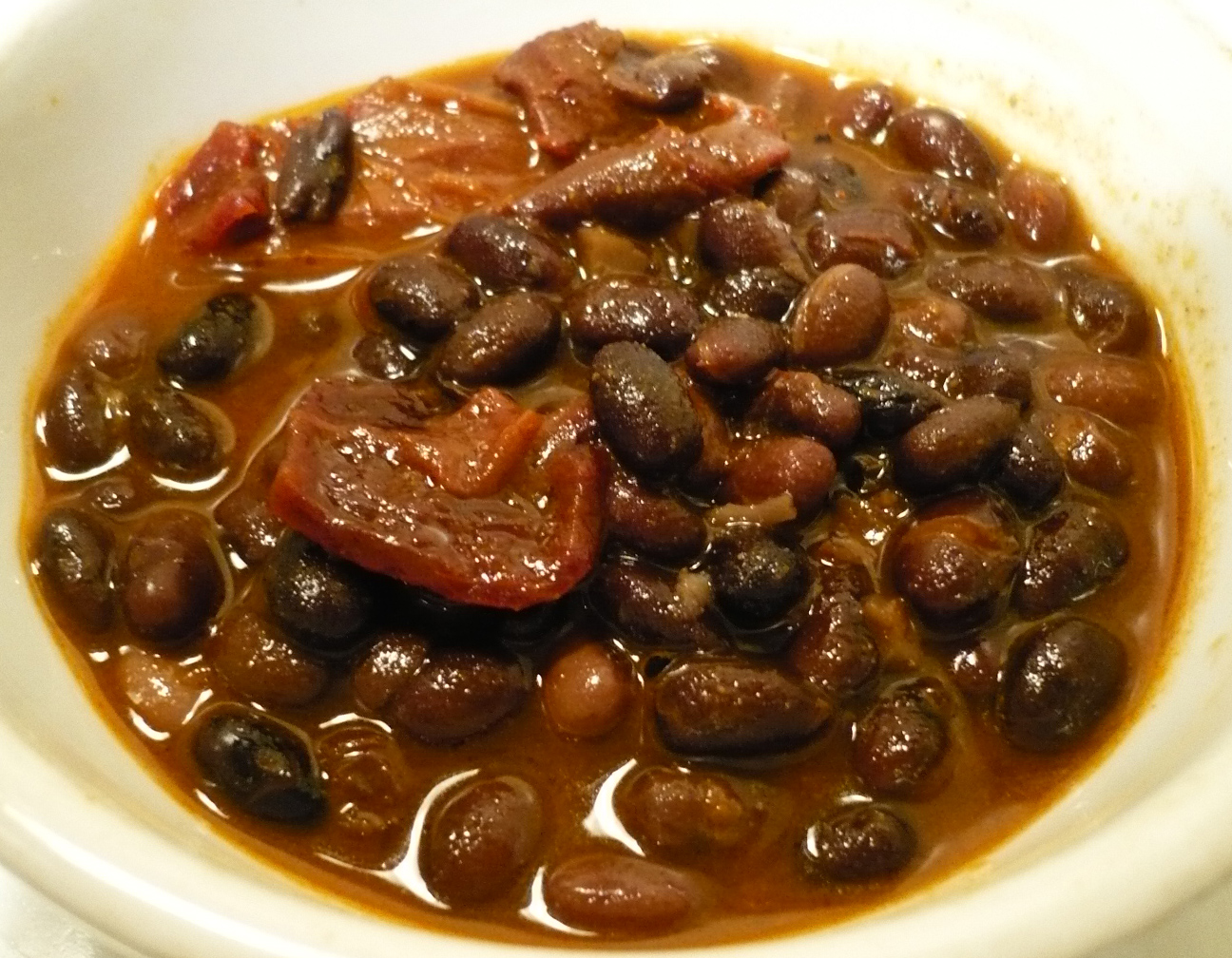
A bowl of Mexican-style vegetarian frijoles negros

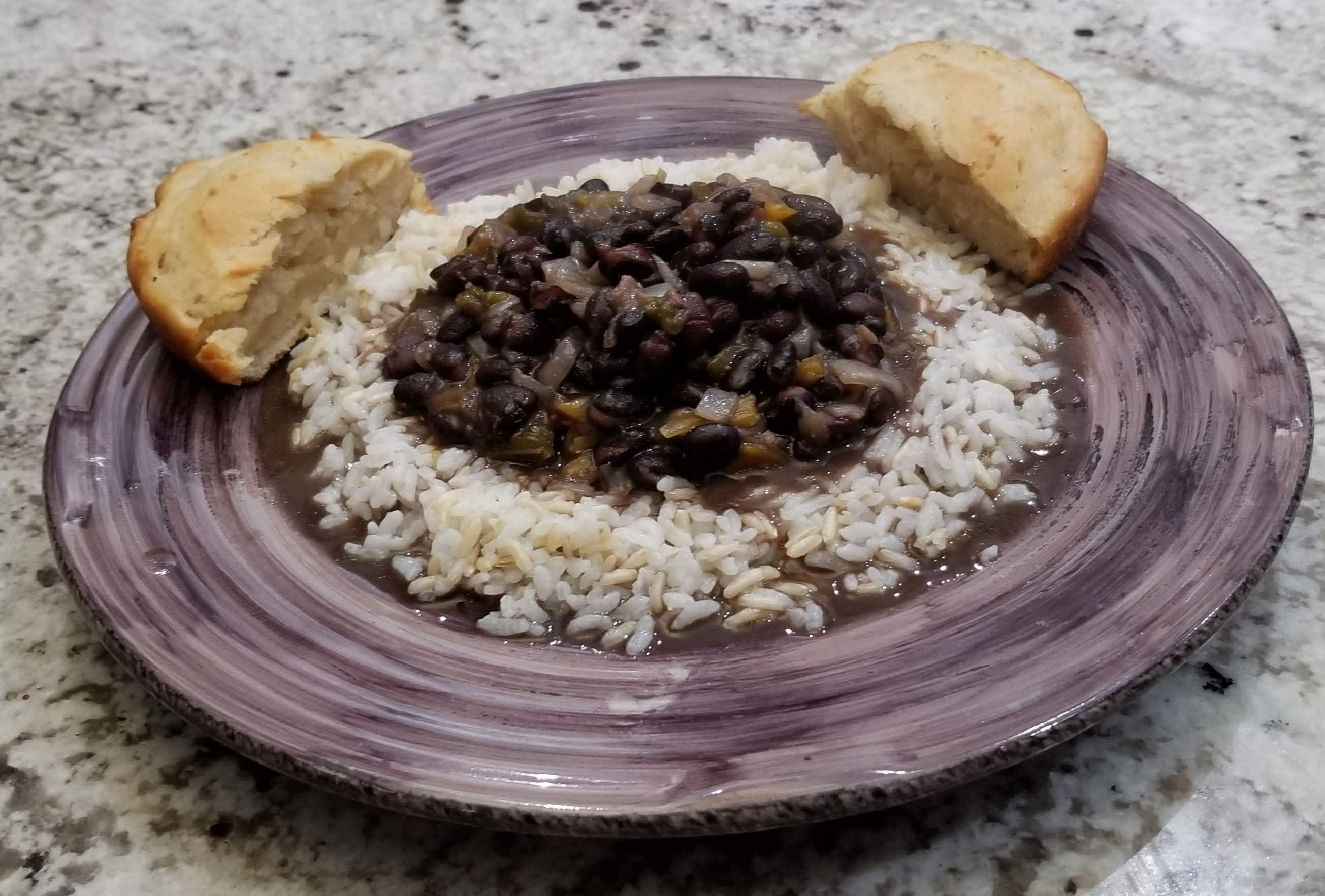
Frijoles Negros over white rice, a common Cuban-Puerto Rican main dish.

Frijoles negros (lit. 'black beans' in Spanish) is a Latin American dish made with black beans, prepared in Guatemala, Cuba, Venezuela (where it is called caraotas negras), Puerto Rico, Mexico, and other nations in Latin America. The black bean, a legume of the species Phaseolus vulgaris, is usually purchased in either canned or dried form. One cup of dried black beans yields approximately 2 1/2 cups of cooked beans. Black bean soup (sopa de frijoles negros) is another commonly prepared Cuban favorite.

Frijoles negros is typically seasoned with salt, ham hocks, onions and garlic, tomatoes, powdered cumin seeds, oregano and vinegar.

== Nutrition ==
Black beans are high in folate (256 μg), iron (3.61 mg), magnesium (120 mg), and phosphorus (241 mg); they are also a source of zinc (1.92 mg), niacin (2 mg), and thiamine (0.42 mg)—based on 1 cup (~240 mL) portion size. Black beans are very high in soluble fiber.

== Glycemic response ==
The glycemic response is not well understood. Black beans have a low glycemic index. Black beans lessen the effects of other foods that rank very high on the glycemic index.

== See also ==
- List of legume dishes
