= Mushy peas =

Thick green lumpy mash of peas

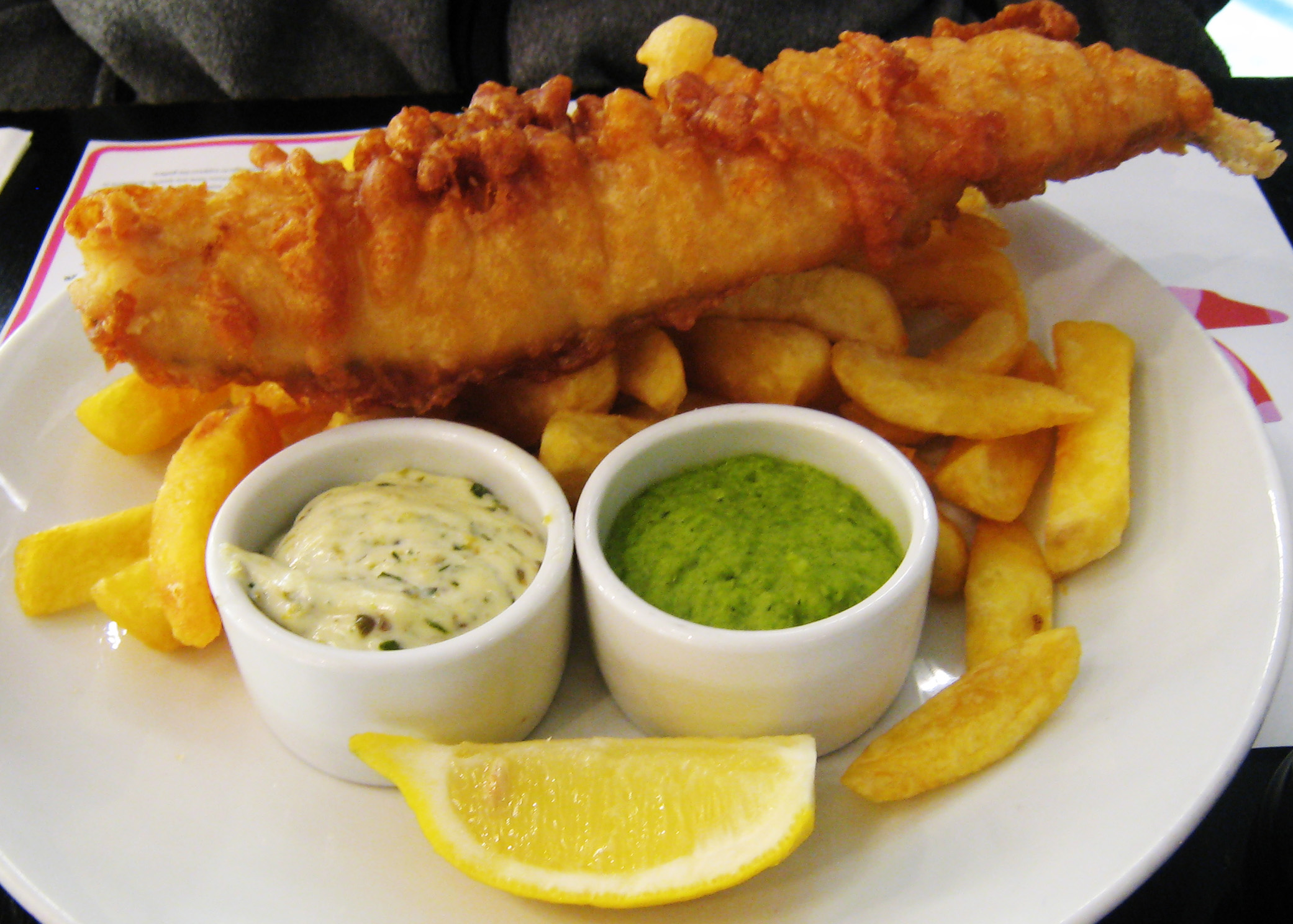
- Fish and chips served with mushy peas in the ramekin on the right
- Place of origin: United Kingdom
- Region or state: England

Mushy peas are dried marrowfat peas which are first soaked overnight in water with sodium bicarbonate, and then rinsed in fresh water, after which the peas are gathered in a saucepan, covered with water, and brought to a boil, and then simmered until the peas are softened. The mush is seasoned with salt and pepper.

Throughout England and Scotland they are a traditional accompaniment to fish and chips. In Northern England they are also commonly served as part of a popular snack called pie and peas (akin to the South Australian pie floater; but instead of the thick pea soup of the floater, in pie and peas it is mushy peas which accompany the meat pie) and are considered to be a part of traditional British cuisine. They are sometimes also packed into a ball, dipped in batter, deep-fried, and served as a pea fritter. Mushy peas can also be bought ready-prepared in tin cans.

== Local variants ==
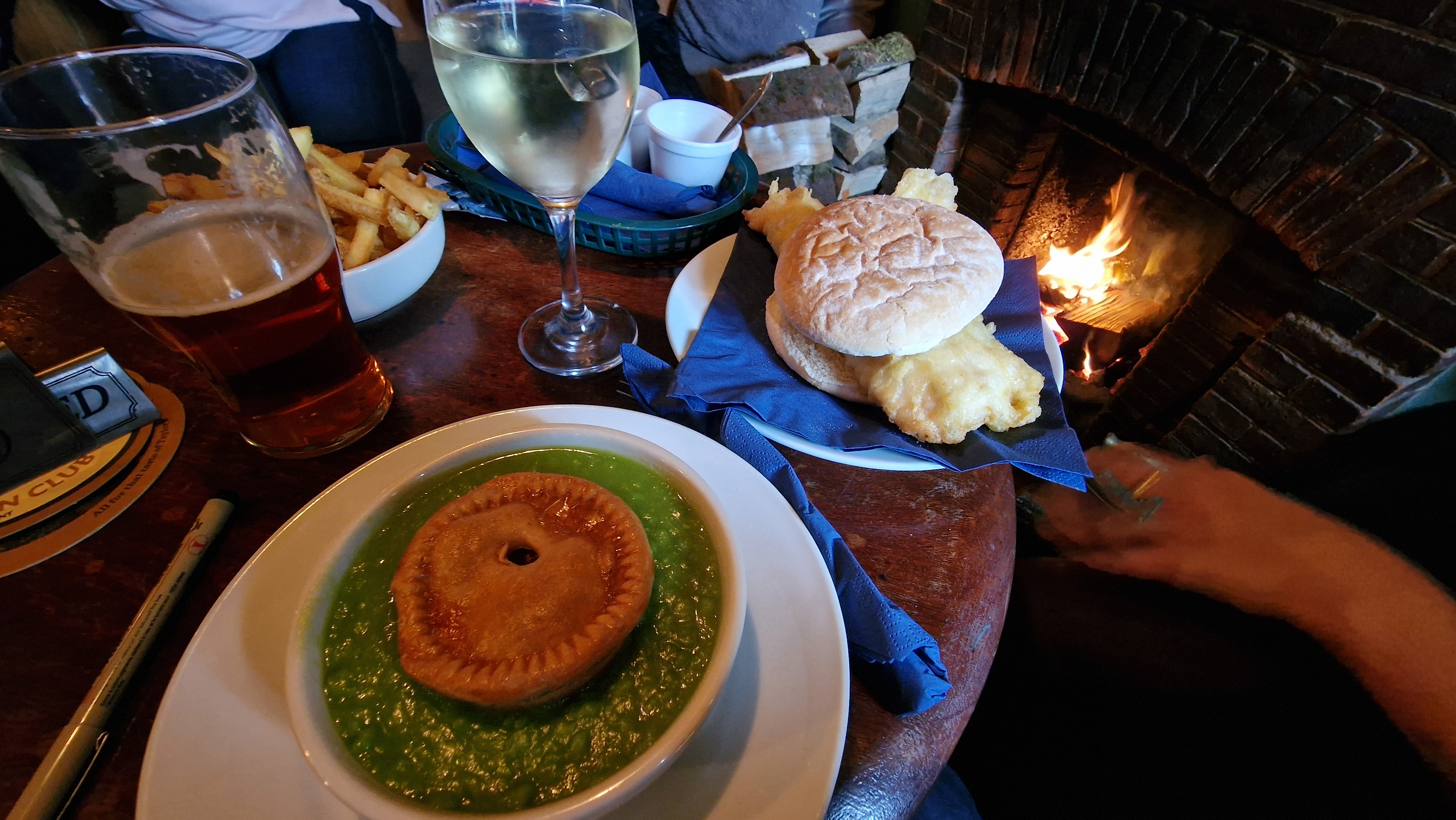
A pub meal consisting of meat pie served in a bowl of mushy peas

In Yorkshire, Nottinghamshire, Derbyshire and parts of Lincolnshire, mushy peas are often served as a snack on their own. In Nottinghamshire they are traditionally accompanied by mint sauce, and sold at open-air events such as fairs or fêtes. In Derbyshire and Nottinghamshire, mushy peas served with chips is called a "pea mix".

A variant (particularly popular around Bolton and Bury of Greater Manchester, and Preston, Lancashire) is parched peas – carlin peas (also known as maple peas or black peas) soaked and then boiled slowly for a long time; these peas are traditionally served with vinegar.

Mushy peas have occasionally been referred to as "Yorkshire caviar."

== Artificial colouring ==
Most commercially produced mushy peas contain artificial colourants to make them green; without these the dish would be murky grey. Traditionally the controversial colourant tartrazine (E102) had been used as one of the colourants. In 2026, Batchelors were using a combination of tartrazine and brilliant blue FCF (E133).

== See also ==
- Black peas
- Pea soup
- Pease pudding
- List of legume dishes
