= Ulava charu =

Spicy and tangy lentil dish

Ulava charu is a rasam (a South Indian soup-like dish) from the state of Andhra Pradesh, India. It is popular in the Guntur district and Krishna districts of Andhra Pradesh. It is made with horse gram, a legume called "ulava" in the native Telugu. The horse gram is boiled in water with salt, then strained from the soup before serving. It is a local delicacy, as the preparation is labor-intensive. Packaged ulava charu is readily available in all urban and rural food supply stores in Andhra Pradesh.

== See also ==
- List of legume dishes
