= Borracho beans =

Bean dish from Mexico and southern Texas

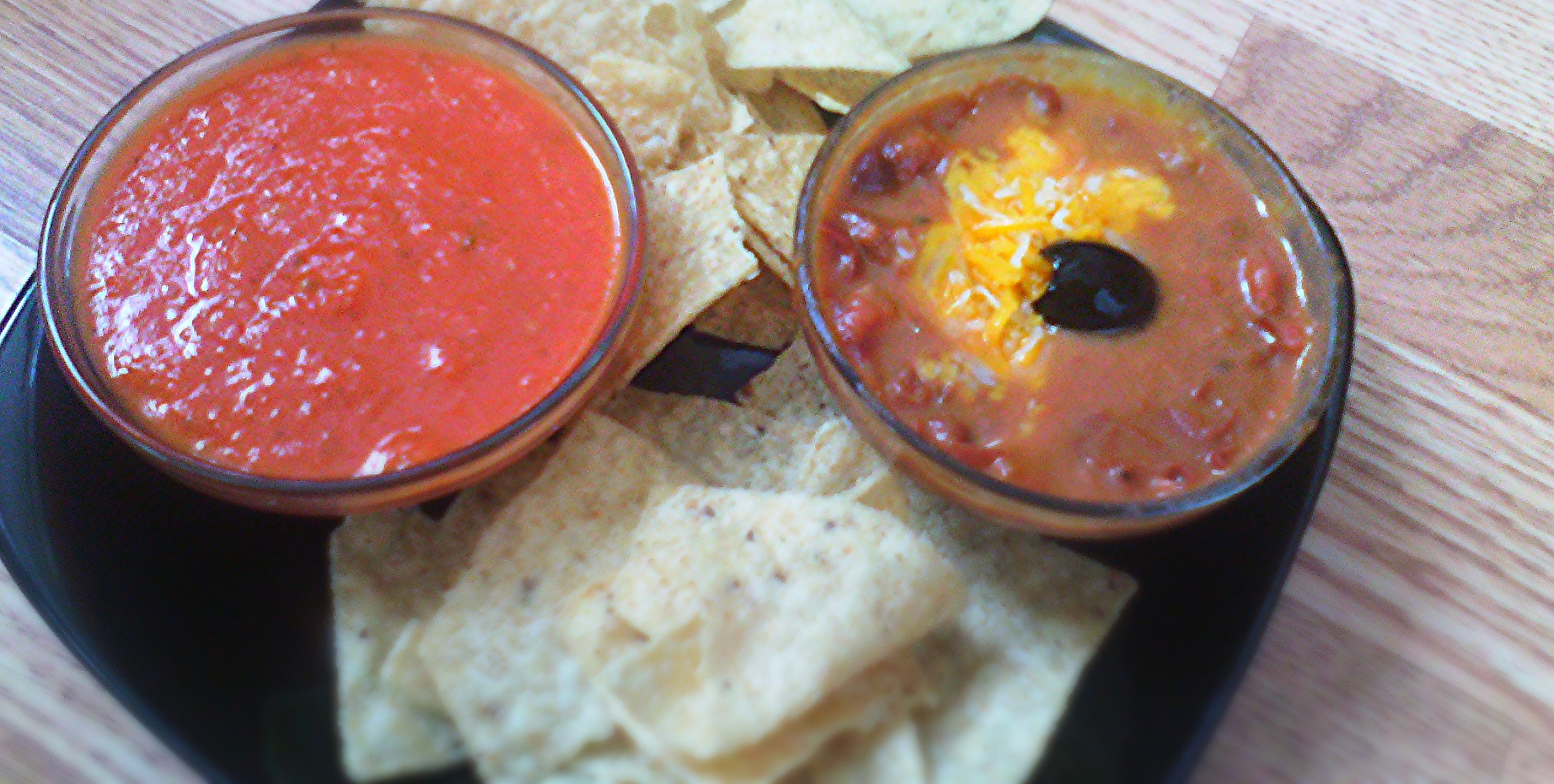
Borracho beans used as bean dip with fresh salsa and tortilla chips

Borracho beans (from borracho meaning "drunk" or "drunken"), also referred to as drunken beans or frijoles borrachos, is a traditional dish of both Mexican and Southern Texas cuisines made of pinto beans cooked in beer and flavored with cilantro, onion, garlic, bacon, bacon fat, cumin, and chili powder or whole chili peppers. Borracho beans can be served wrapped in tortillas with some form of grilled beef such as carne asada, eaten from a bowl much like chili, or used as a bean dip and eaten with tortilla chips. Variations on this dish in Mexican cuisine often substitute black beans instead of pinto beans.

== Preparation ==
The beans are soaked overnight, drained, then dark beer is added along with bacon, bacon drippings, and other spices (cilantro, onion, garlic, cumin, powdered or whole chili peppers) and enough water to cover the beans by a few inches, then cooked in a covered pot for 2-3 hours until the beans are tender. Southern Texas borracho bean recipes may include diced tomatoes added to the broth, and Mexican recipes often include the herb epazote. Borracho beans are sometimes served as an accompaniment to beef or chicken tacos, and cheese enchiladas.

== See also ==
- Cowboy beans
- Frijoles charros
