= Marrowfat peas =

Green peas that have dried out naturally

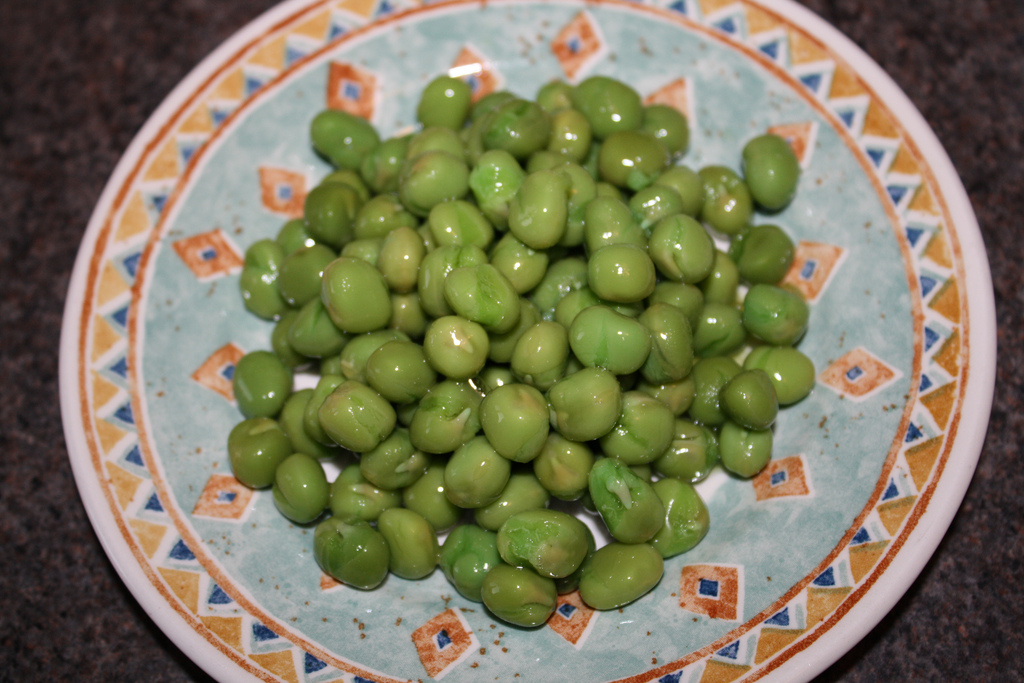
Marrowfat peas

Marrowfat peas are green mature peas (Pisum sativum L. or Pisum sativum var. medullare) that have been allowed to dry out naturally in the field, rather than being harvested while still young like the normal garden pea. They are starchy, and are used to make mushy peas. Marrowfat peas with a good green colour are exported from the UK to Japan for the snack food market, while paler peas are used for canning. Those with thin skins and a soft texture are ideal for making mushy peas.

Canned marrowfat or "processed" peas are reconstituted from dried peas. These are soaked in cold water for 12 to 16 hours, sometimes with sodium bicarbonate added to aid softening. The peas are then blanched for 5 minutes and then canned in a brine containing sugar, salt and food colouring, before the cans are heat processed at 115 °C (239 °F).

The name "marrowfat" is believed to have been coined around 1730 as a portmanteau of marrow and fat, although some claim the peas were named because people wanted plump (fat) peas of the Maro variety, a Japanese variety introduced to the UK in the early 20th century.

== See also ==
- Split pea – Dried and split seed of Pisum sativum
