= Frijoles charros =

Mexican pinto bean dish

Frijoles charros (cowboy beans) is a traditional Mexican dish. It is named after the traditional Mexican cowboy horsemen, or charros. The dish is characterized by pinto beans stewed with onion, garlic, and bacon. Other common ingredients include chili peppers, tomatoes, cilantro, ham, sausage, pork and chorizo. It is served warm, and is usually of a soupy consistency.

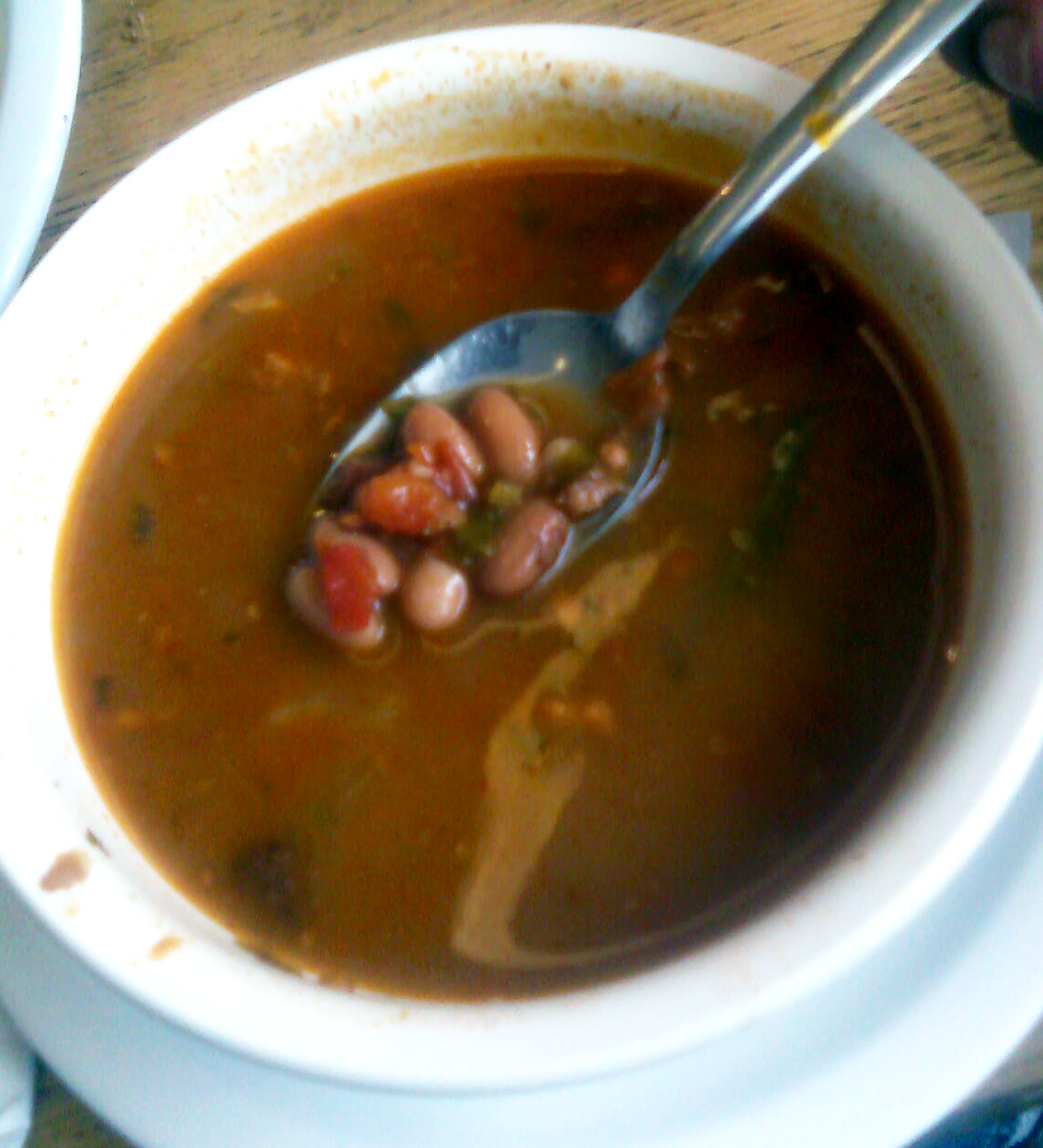
Frijoles charros

== See also ==
- Borracho beans
- Cowboy beans, a similar US dish. Cowboy beans are usually made with onions, garlic, tomatoes, salted pork, chillies and beans.
