= Pie and peas =

British dish

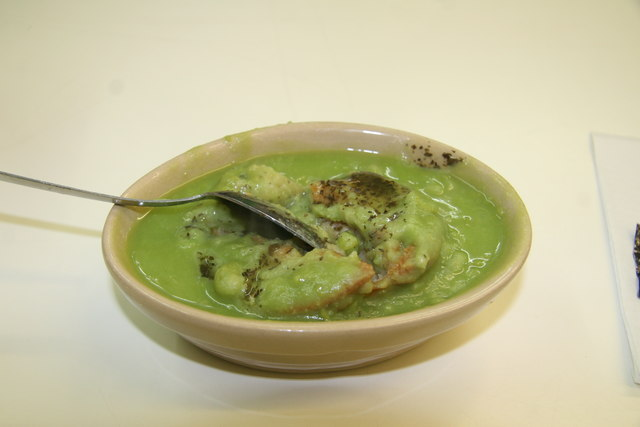
- Type: Pie
- Place of origin: England
- Region or state: Northern England
- Main ingredients: Meat pie, hot water crust pastry, mashed potato, mushy peas, mint sauce

Pie and peas is a traditional meal in Northern England, consisting of an individual meat pie served with mushy peas. The term is sometimes also applied when the side is mashed potato, mint sauce, pickled onions or gravy.

== History ==
Pies are commonly purchased rather than made at home. In the past, pie and pea shops and stalls were a familiar sight on Northern streets and markets. Nowadays, they are more commonly sold in sandwich shops and "chippies". While some individuals prefer meat and potato or steak pies, pie and peas remain a staple food on British football terraces and are particularly popular among football fans.

== See also ==
- Pie floater
- Steak pie
- Pie and mash
