= Peas with salo =

Traditional Polish dish

Peas with salo (Polish: groch ze słoniną) is a dish from traditional Polish cuisine, made from thick-cooked, often pureed peas with melted salo added. It was consumed from the Middle Ages by all social classes and was an essential part of noble feasts. Mentions of it appear in numerous literary works, written by both Poles and foreigners. Over time, it fell into obscurity.

== Recipe ==
The dish was made from thick-cooked peas, usually mashed, to which fat and cracklings rendered from salo were added as a garnish. An example of a recipe used in military kitchens during the period of the Second Polish Republic:

Split peas with salo

For one serving, you need:

– 150 g split peas,
– 20 g salo,
– 1 g fresh onion.

The split peas are boiled and then covered with hot melted fat with browned onion, seasoned with salt, and mixed well. Finally, more fat is poured on top.

Preparation of peas with salo

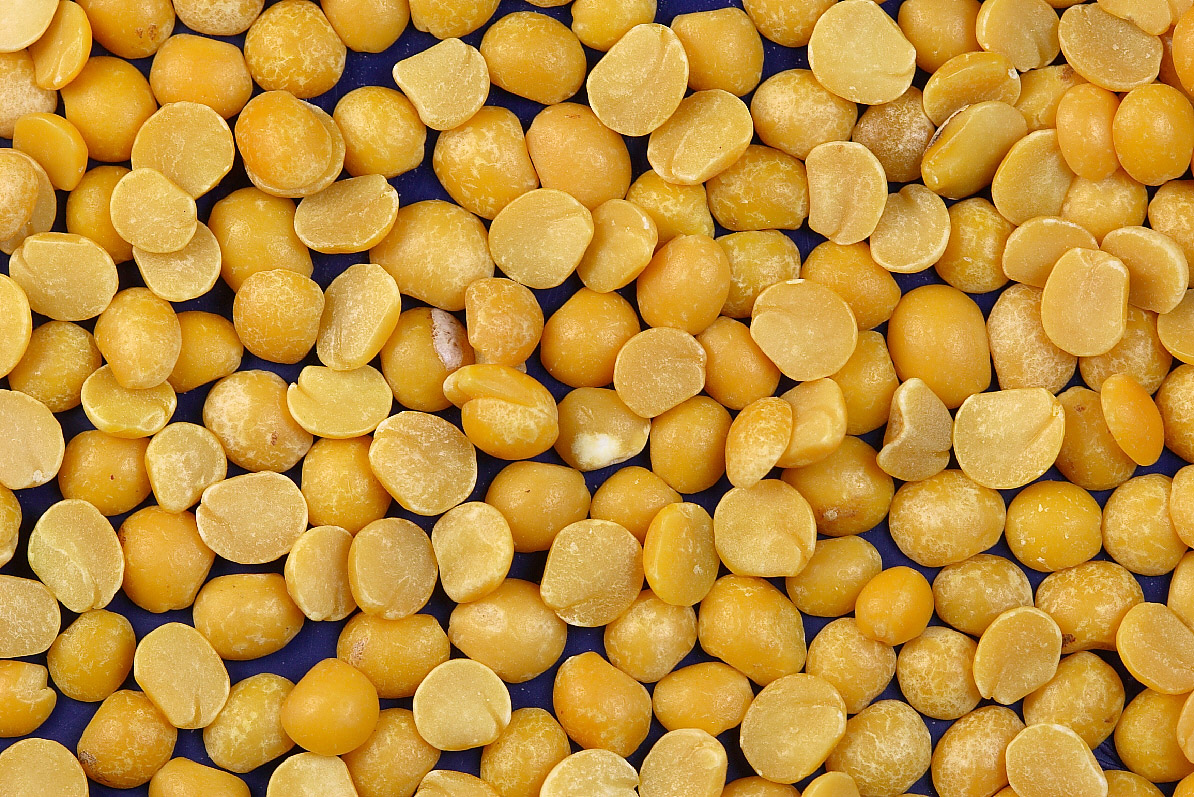
Split peas

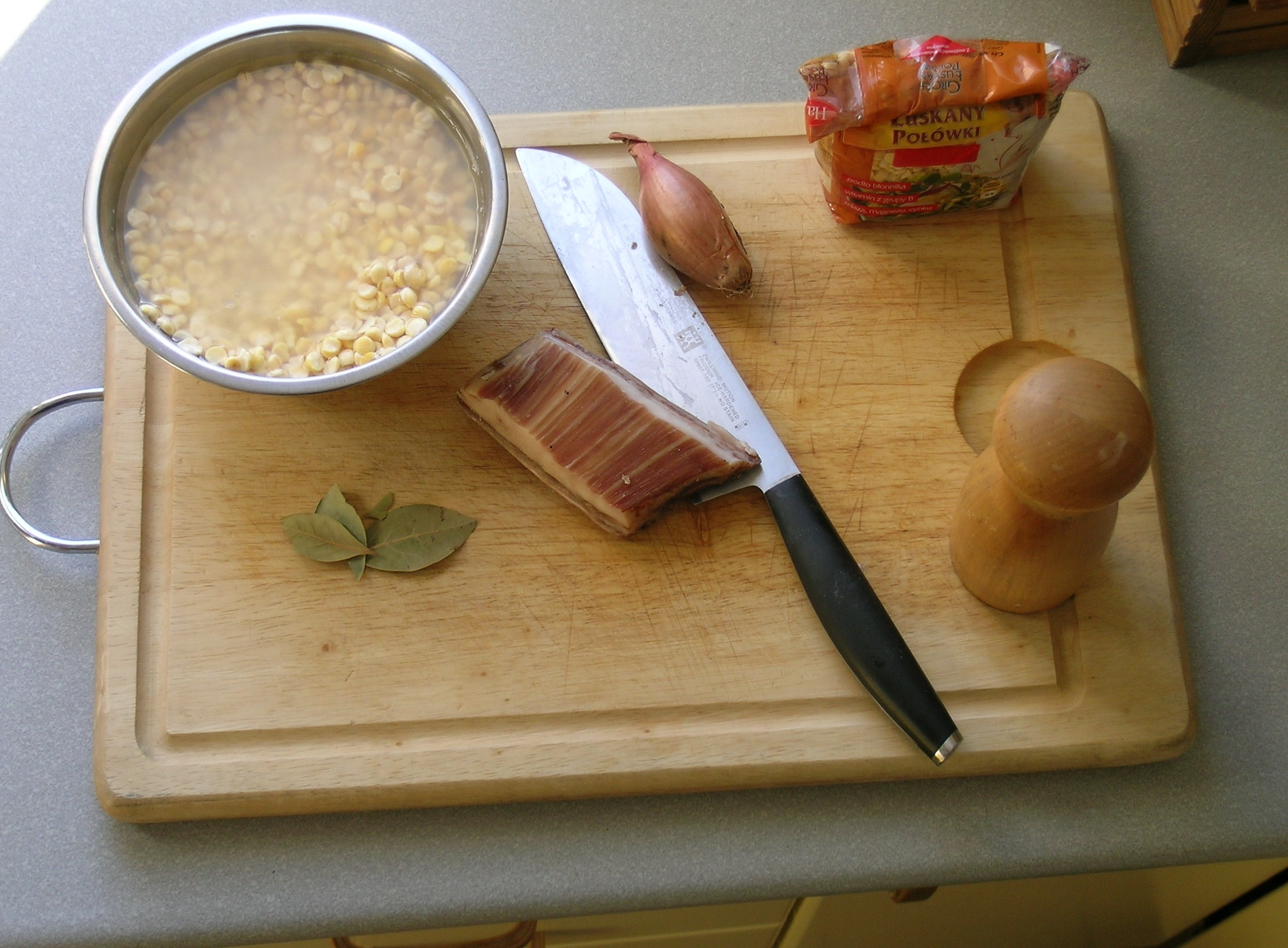
Ingredients

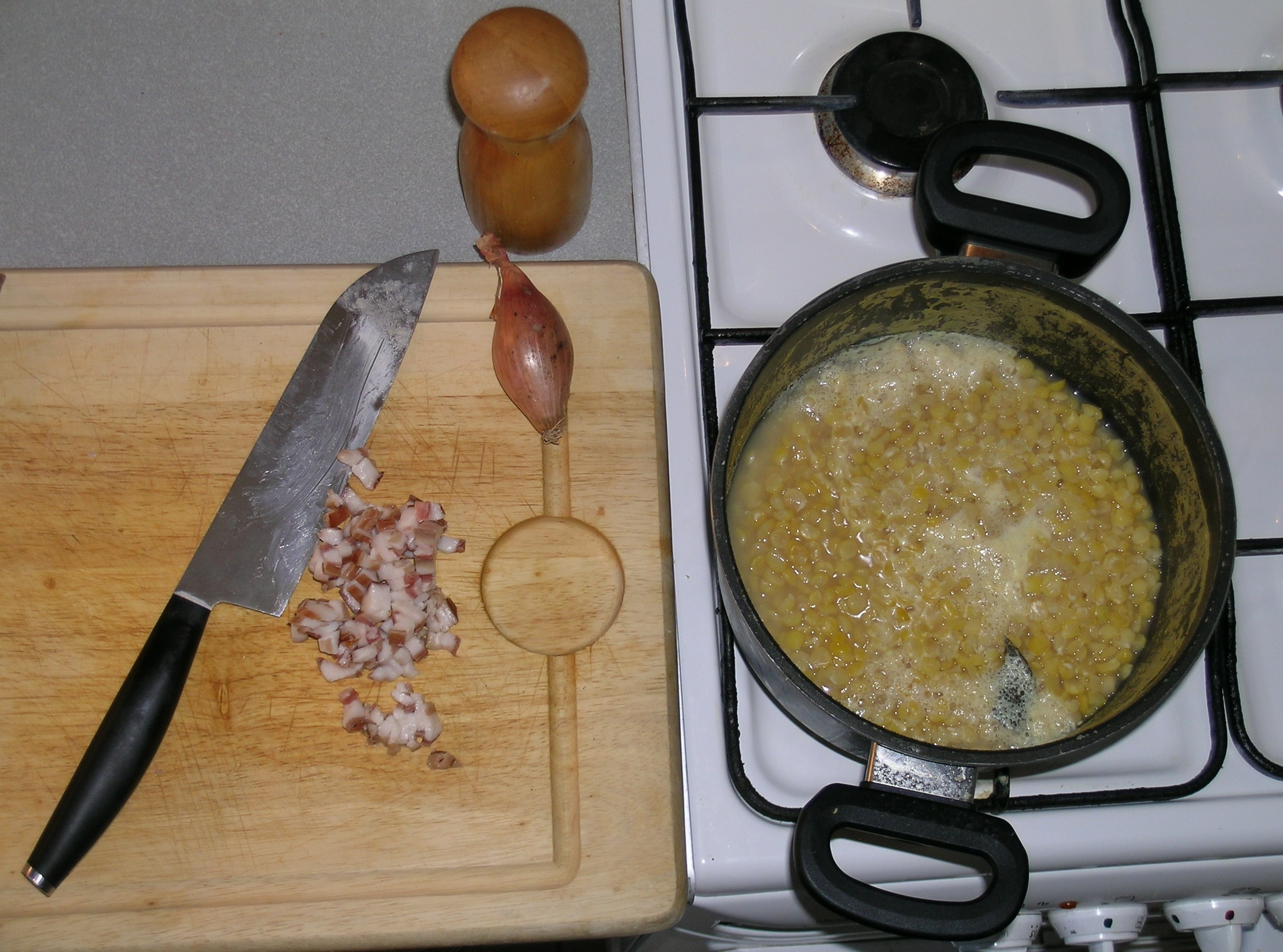
Boiling of peas

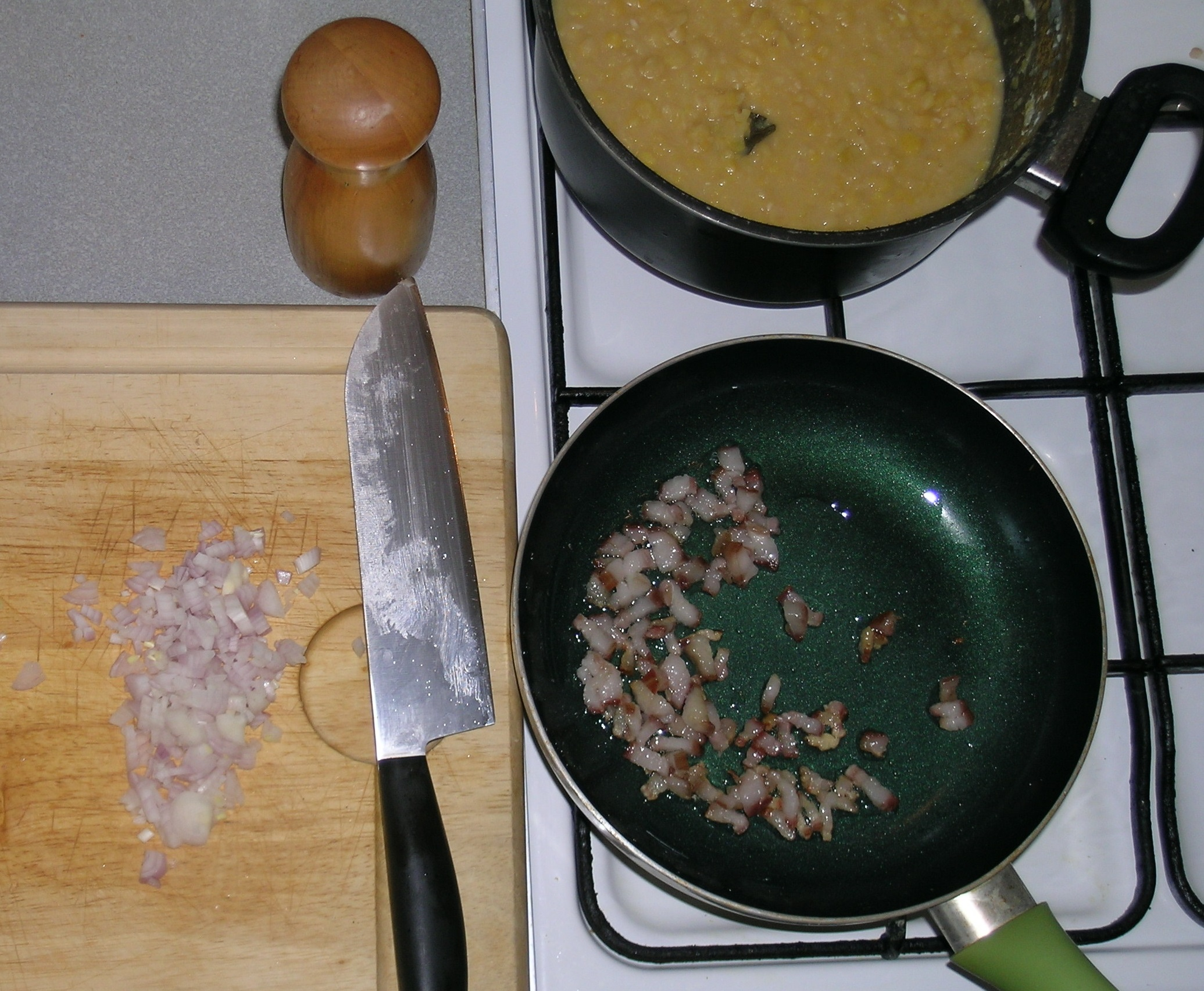
Frying of salo

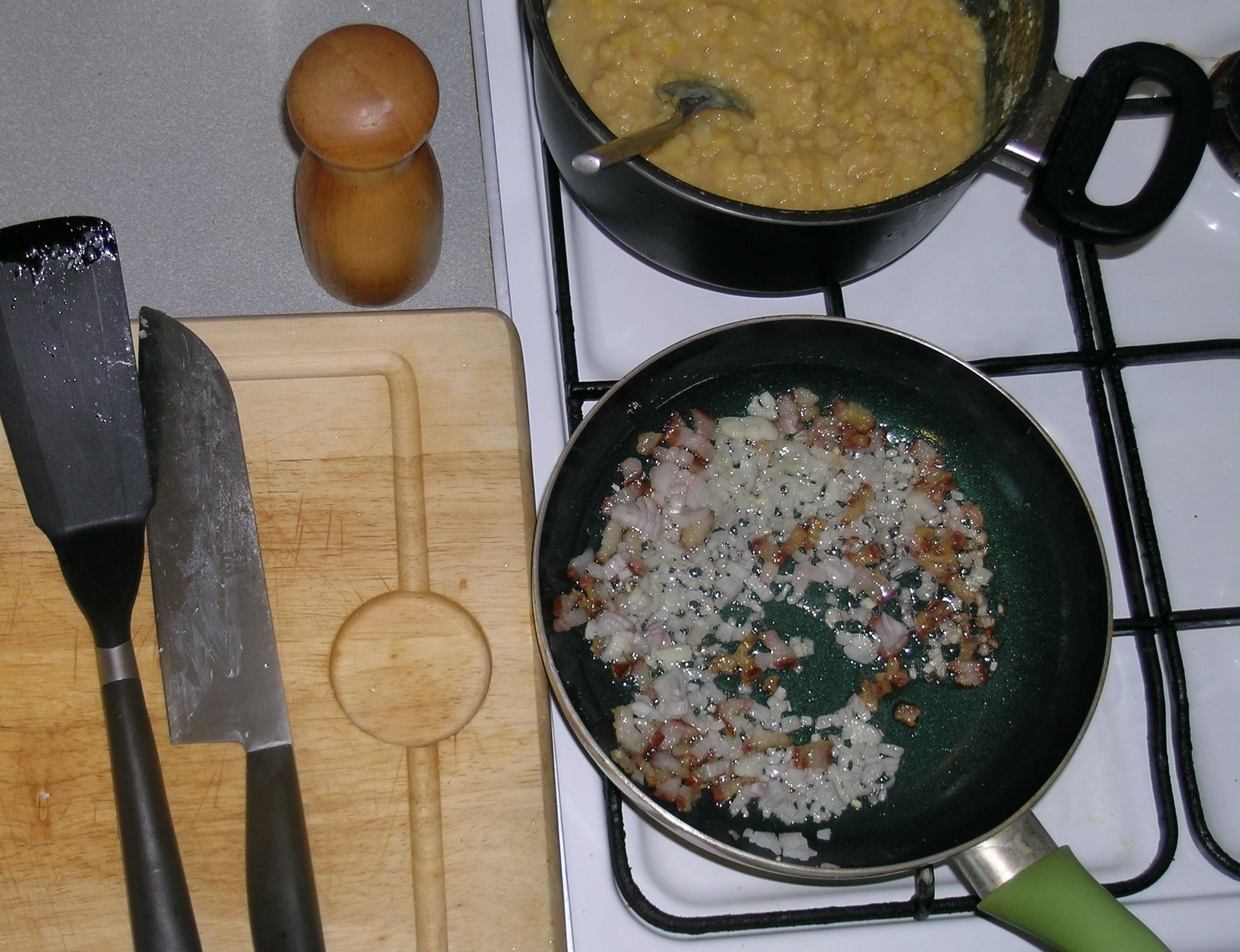
Frying of salo and onion

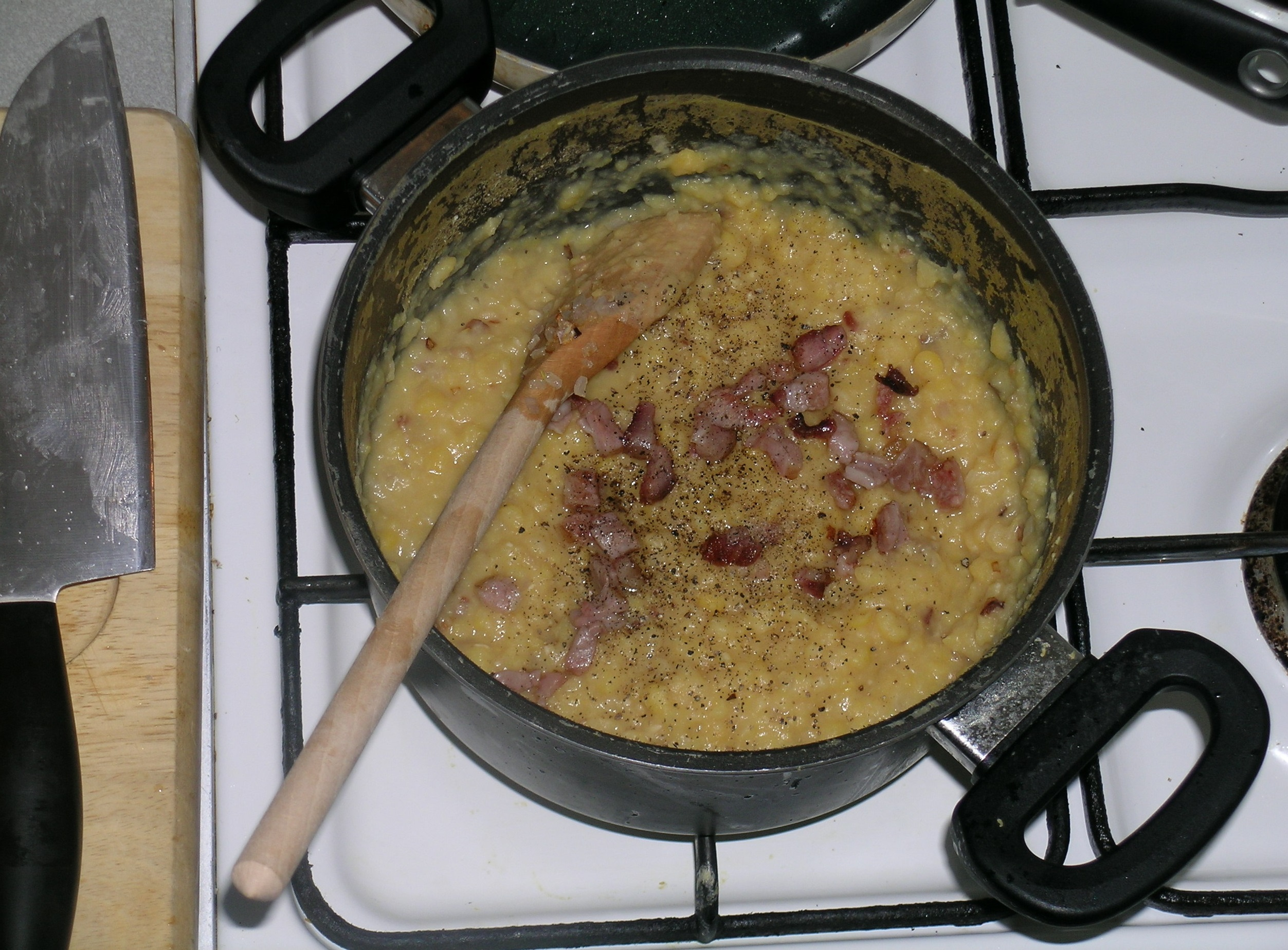
Ready dish

== History of the dish ==
=== Until the 16th century ===
Cooked into a thick paste, peas with salo were eaten in Poland at least since the Middle Ages. It is known that peas with salo were one of King Sigismund III Vasa's favorite dishes. In the 16th century, it became a common dish on the tables of the nobility and gentry.

=== 17th and 18th centuries ===
During this period, peas with salo were one of the staple dishes in the diet of peasants, who, due to their dire legal and economic situation, had little access to meat-based dishes. As in earlier times, peas with salo remained one of the everyday dishes on the noble tables as well. A preserved contract from 1638 attests to this, which stipulated that the mayor of Bełżyce, Jan Nemorecki, was to provide accommodation and meals for the sons of the nobleman Jan Drohojowski and the townsman Tomasz Mirus during their schooling at the local city school. One of the dishes listed was peas with salo, which was to appear regularly on the table as a "second vegetable dish", alternating with sauerkraut or fresh cabbage with salo, with the condition that "the salo should not be yellow but good-quality".

References to peas with salo and its role in early Polish culture have also been preserved in numerous source texts, including those by foreigners. Many of them emphasized how much Poles loved this dish and how willingly they ate it, regardless of social status. The French engineer and cartographer Guillaume Le Vasseur de Beauplan, who worked in the service of Polish kings from the Vasa dynasty – Sigismund III, Władysław IV, and John II Casimir – between 1630 and 1648, described a magnate feast on the eastern borders of the Polish–Lithuanian Commonwealth in his memoirs:

After this dish, various stews and delicacies are served, such as peas with salo (without which no feast exists for the Poles, and which they love so much that they do not eat it, but swallow it), they also serve millet porridge, barley porridge, egg porridge, and finally small buckwheat dumplings with poppy milk; I suppose they eat these to fill up completely, and then sleep well.

Ulrich von Werdum from Friesland, who traveled through the Polish–Lithuanian Commonwealth between 1670 and 1672, noted:

They eagerly eat fatty food. They treated us to fresh cheese fried in butter and peas thickly mixed with salo cut into cubes.

Bernard Connor, the personal physician to King John III Sobieski, also mentioned the dish:

For dinner, there must always be mashed peas with pork.

Wacław Potocki, in his 1677 collection of epigrams Iovialitates, albo żarty y fraszki rozmaite, recounts an incident involving a Pole in Italy who fell ill and was treated by a local doctor. Among other things, the doctor prescribed a strict diet, but the patient grew worse from the treatment and secretly decided to abandon the doctor’s instructions. He ate peas with salo and recovered, to the amazement of the doctor, who decided to use the same treatment method on a fellow Italian. The Italian, however, could not tolerate the treatment and died after three days. The doctor recorded:

[...] Thus, he also wrote in his books that peas with salo only serves the Poles, but does not agree with the Italians.

In 1642, Krzysztof Opaliński wrote in his satire Na zbytki w częstowaniu i bankietach, highlighting peas with salo as a dish of old tradition, which was being replaced by new fashions:

[...] And so, as the noble ancestors and old Poles used to have: when they didn’t know on rich tables what pâté, what cakes, or jellies were, don’t ask about white rolls or marzipan, except perhaps at weddings. So, they placed dishes: one with beef, another with vegetables and the fourth with peas, in which salo swam, like a whale in the sea. There were no silver dishes ready. It was not so long ago that the first silver plate was only seen on the table for the game. The king himself ate from silver, everyone else from pewter.

However, by the 17th century, peas with salo had become an old-fashioned dish, mostly eaten by the poorer and more conservative members of the nobility. At the turn of the 17th and 18th centuries, peas with salo became part of the diet for the poor and sick at the St. Lazarus Hospital in Warsaw. At the same time, it was still eaten at the royal court. On 3 August 1735, the Order of the White Eagle was celebrated in Warsaw, as well as the name day of King Augustus III. After the ceremonies and the conferral of the order to 10 new knights, followed by a royal banquet, shooting competitions took place. The king, queen, high-ranking court officials, and diplomats participated in these rounds, and the rewards were traditional Polish dishes:

In the second round of shots, the first prize was won by General Lieutenant Prince Lubomirski. It was a plate of peas with salo.

=== 19th century and later ===
In the 19th century, peas with salo were eaten by people of the lowest social status. This is illustrated by a Christmas carol from Kashubia, noted by Zygmunt Gloger:

If you were born in our Kashubia, you wouldn't have been hungry, little Jesus: for every breakfast, you would have had a fried dish, with a bun and butter, a glass of milk. For supper with pancakes, there would be sausages along with dumplings: there would be peas with salo, turnips with mutton, and plump roasted birds.

There were also accounts in which peas with salo were still considered a traditional Polish dish, but it was being replaced on tables by foreign culinary customs. In the work Jan z Tęczyna, Julian Ursyn Niemcewicz portrayed peas with salo as part of the old Polish noble and magnate tradition:

Then, young Tęczyński said, friend, in gathering samples from all of us, you've forgotten about food. — What should I eat? he replied, when I find myself in some painted forest, where various monsters frighten me. Here stands a girl in a fur cloak, shall I dare to plunge my knife into her chest? I cannot touch those massive oaks with acorns; I will not pick those many flowers, it's a pity, they will soon be trampled; here from one side flies a gilded ram, from the other, a silver lion opens its jaws; from this almond tower falls a golden-feathered rooster. Such feasts, he added, are fit for the mad Orlando, not for me. Then noticing a bowl of peas with salo, the dish most beloved by Poles, he exclaimed: 'Ah, I see human food that I may taste!' Saying this, he piled his plate high with peas and began to eat it with pleasure. 'This is healthier,' he said, 'than your delicate almond cakes stuck together with glue, not to mention when you pour those muscatels, witheppars, rosemary, rye, malmsey, alicants on them. How will the peasant thrive with all of this?'

Peas with salo as a dish fading into the past is also mentioned by Józef Ignacy Kraszewski in a (fictional) description of a banquet hosted by Prince Konstanty Wasyl Ostrogski at his castle in Dubno:

After the first dish, at the marshal’s signal, it was taken away along with the first tablecloth, and the second one was set with various roasts: wild game, poultry, and fish. Despite the grandeur of the feast, one could still spot simple dishes on the table, such as the now despised peas with salo and our native buckwheat. After the second tablecloth was removed, the third course consisted entirely of sweets.

As for cookbooks, Maria Ochorowicz-Monatowa provides recipes for this dish, though she no longer uses its historical name:

47. Ordinary yellow peas. The usual dried peas, it’s best to soak them the day before in lukewarm water, so they cook quickly and evenly. After soaking, drain and add fresh water, and you can add a pinch of baking soda at the end of cooking, then cook until completely soft. Only then should they be salted, and before serving, drain them in a colander, place them on a platter, and pour melted butter with browned breadcrumbs or fried salo with cracklings. 48. Puree of dried peas. Cook regular yellow round peas as described above; mash them through a colander, mix with broth or the flavor from smoked meat or ham, and when serving with meat or cold cuts, pour with melted butter and browned breadcrumbs or melted salo.

In the armed forces of the Second Polish Republic, peas with salo was one of the dishes served to soldiers, and in the 21st century, reenactment groups prepare peas with salo according to military recipes from that period. The collective work Kuchnia polska gives a recipe for pea puree, marked as a typical Polish dish, which repeats the military recipe with minimal changes. In a scholarly work on the history of Polish cuisine in 2015, peas with salo were described as a "nearly national dish" of Poland.

== Bibliography ==
- Łoziński, Jan; Łozińska, Maja (2012). Historia polskiego smaku. Kuchnia, stół, obyczaje [The History of Polish Taste. Cuisine, Table, Customs] (in Polish). Polish Scientific Publishers PWN. ISBN 978-83-01-17102-5.
- Peszke, Józef (1903). Kuchnia polska dawna: urywek z jej dziejów od czasów najdawniejszych do końca wieku XVII [Old Polish Cuisine: A Fragment of Its History from the Earliest Times to the End of the 17th Century] (in Polish). Gazeta Domowa.
