= Peabutter =

Savory spread

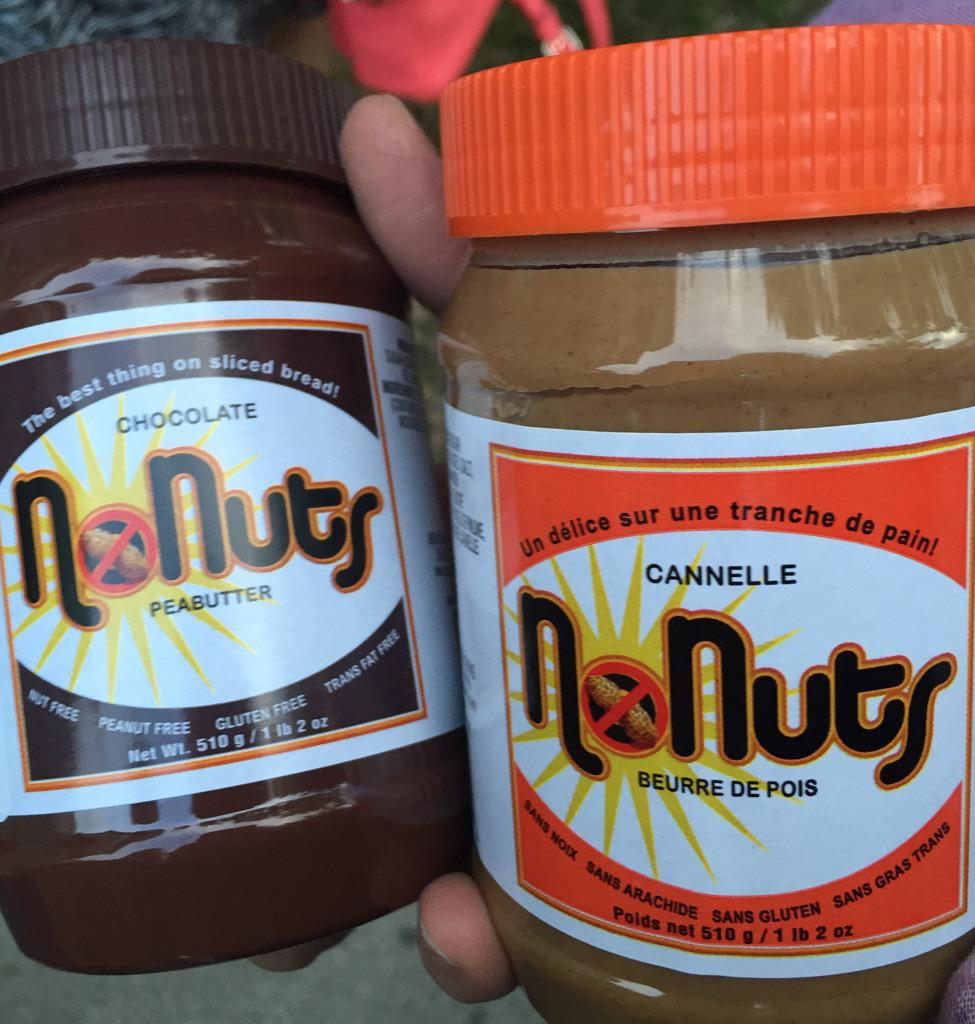
- NoNuts peabutter
- Type: Spread
- Place of origin: Canada
- Main ingredients: Brown peas

Peabutter is a savory spread used as an alternative to peanut butter.

== History ==
The product was first prepared by Alberta farmer Joe St. Denis in July 2002 who realized that the brown pea had certain similarities to peanuts. Oils such as canola and cottonseed are combined with icing sugar and mixed with crushed solid brown peas to form the spread.

== Distribution ==
Peabutter was distributed to the United States Armed Forces, which requested alternative products for those allergic to peanuts.

== Concerns ==
Children who are susceptible to peanut-triggered anaphylaxis may not be able to distinguish between peabutter and peanut butter. Some schools have also banned peabutter, fearing potential confusion with peanut butter.
