= Hodmedod's =

British food retail and production company

Hodmedod Ltd
- Founded: 2012; 13 years ago
- Headquarters: Brampton, Suffolk, United Kingdom
- Website: hodmedods.co.uk

Hodmedod Ltd or Hodmedod's is a British food retail and production company founded in 2012 and based in Brampton in Suffolk. They specialise in British-grown pulses, grains and seeds. The company grew out of the Norwich Resilient Food Project, a community initiative initiated by Transition City Norwich which asked whether a small city could feed itself and, if so, how diets and land use might need to change.

In 2014 they launched a range of three kinds of tinned British-grown fava beans, and in 2017 they grew a commercial-scale crop of lentils, having been told that this was impossible in the British climate.

In 2016 their organic quinoa, developed in Essex and grown in Suffolk, won Delicious magazine's produce award in the "From the earth (primary)" category.

In 2017 they won the BBC Food & Farming Award "Best Food Producers" category. In late 2019 they became the first company to offer British grown Chickpeas for sale in the UK.

== Name and logo ==
The company logo shows a hedgehog. On the company website it is stated that Hodmedod is an East Anglian word for variously a hedgehog, a snail, an ammonite or curls in a girl's hair: all things small and curled up and thus possibly including beans and peas. "We chose the word for the name of our business simply because we like the sound of it, and feel that it reflects our East Anglian backgrounds and represents part of our forgotten heritage, a bit like the fava bean or black badger peas". It is also a Berkshire word for a scarecrow.
