= Rice and peas =

Traditional Caribbean food

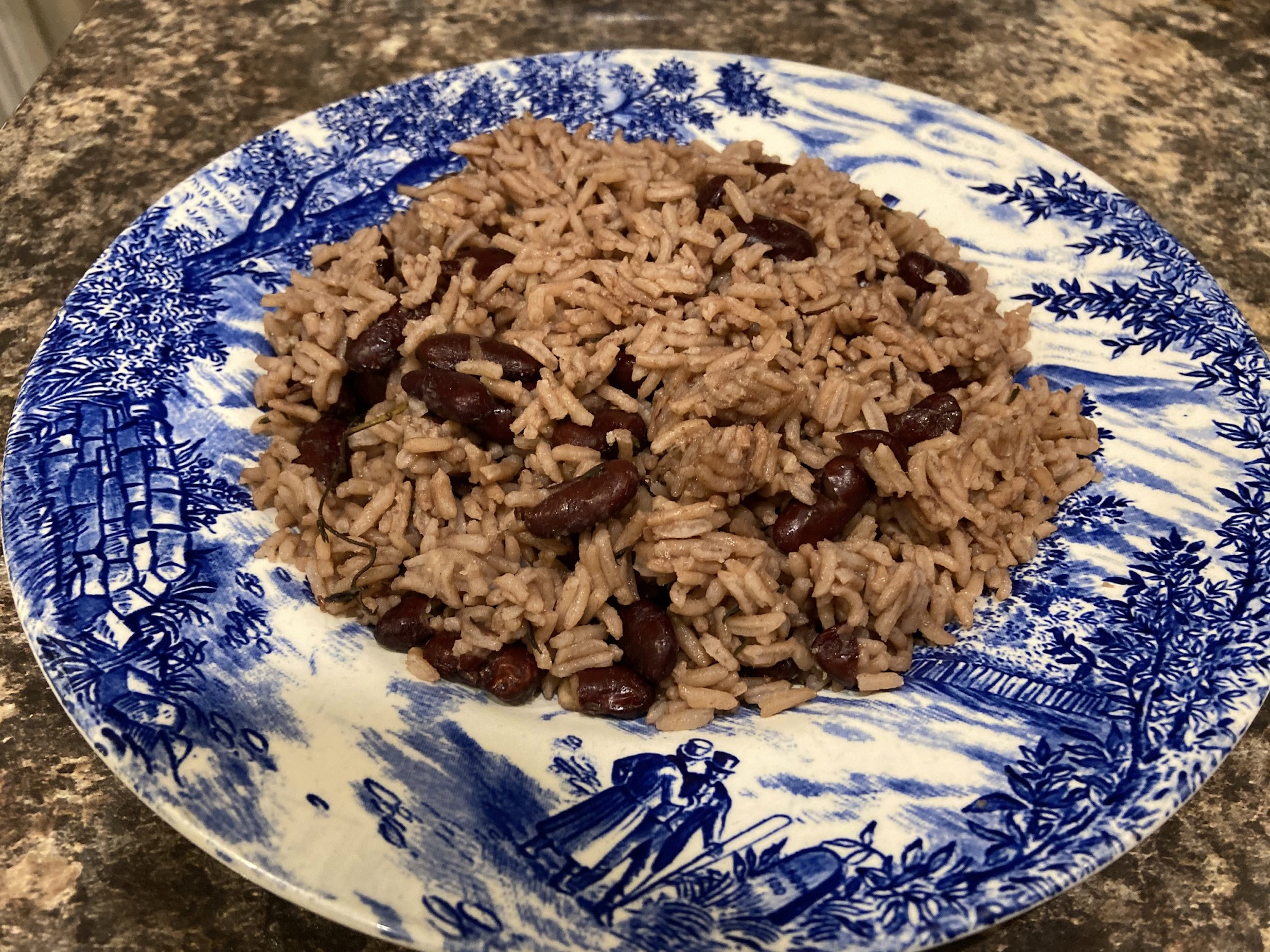
- Jamaican rice and peas
- Course: Side dish
- Region or state: Caribbean and coastal Latin America
- Serving temperature: Hot
- Main ingredients: Rice; beans

Rice and peas or peas and rice is a traditional rice dish in some Caribbean and Latin American countries. Kidney beans (red peas/beans) and other similar varieties are typically used to prepare the dish in the Greater Antilles and coastal Latin America. Sometimes, it is made with pigeon peas, otherwise called gungo peas by Jamaicans. Rice and peas recipes vary throughout the region, with each country having its own way(s) of making them and name(s)—with the two main ingredients being legumes (peas/beans) and rice, combined with herbs, spices and/or coconut milk.

== History ==
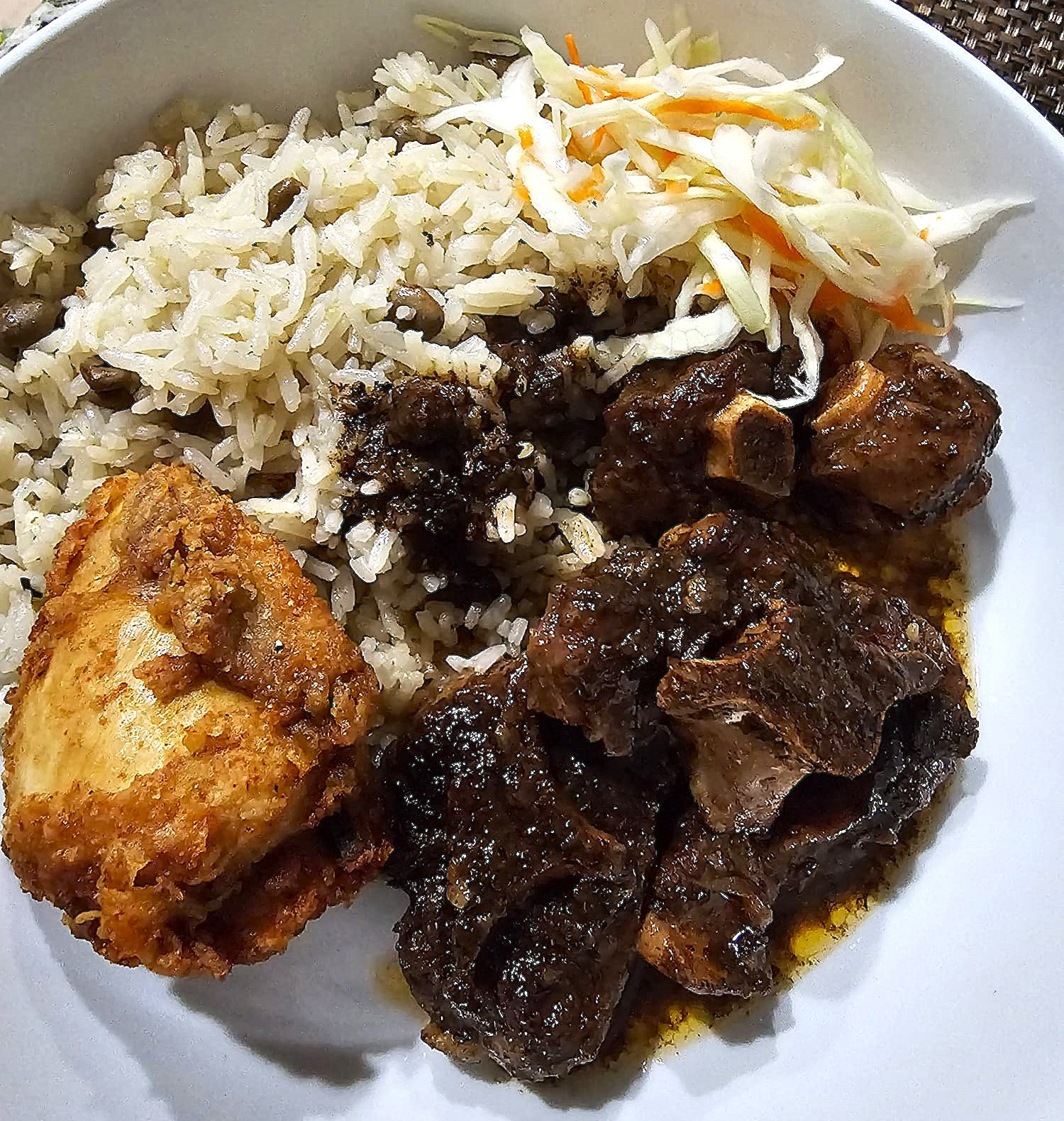
Typical Jamaican meal—fried chicken and oxtail, with a side of rice and (gungo) peas

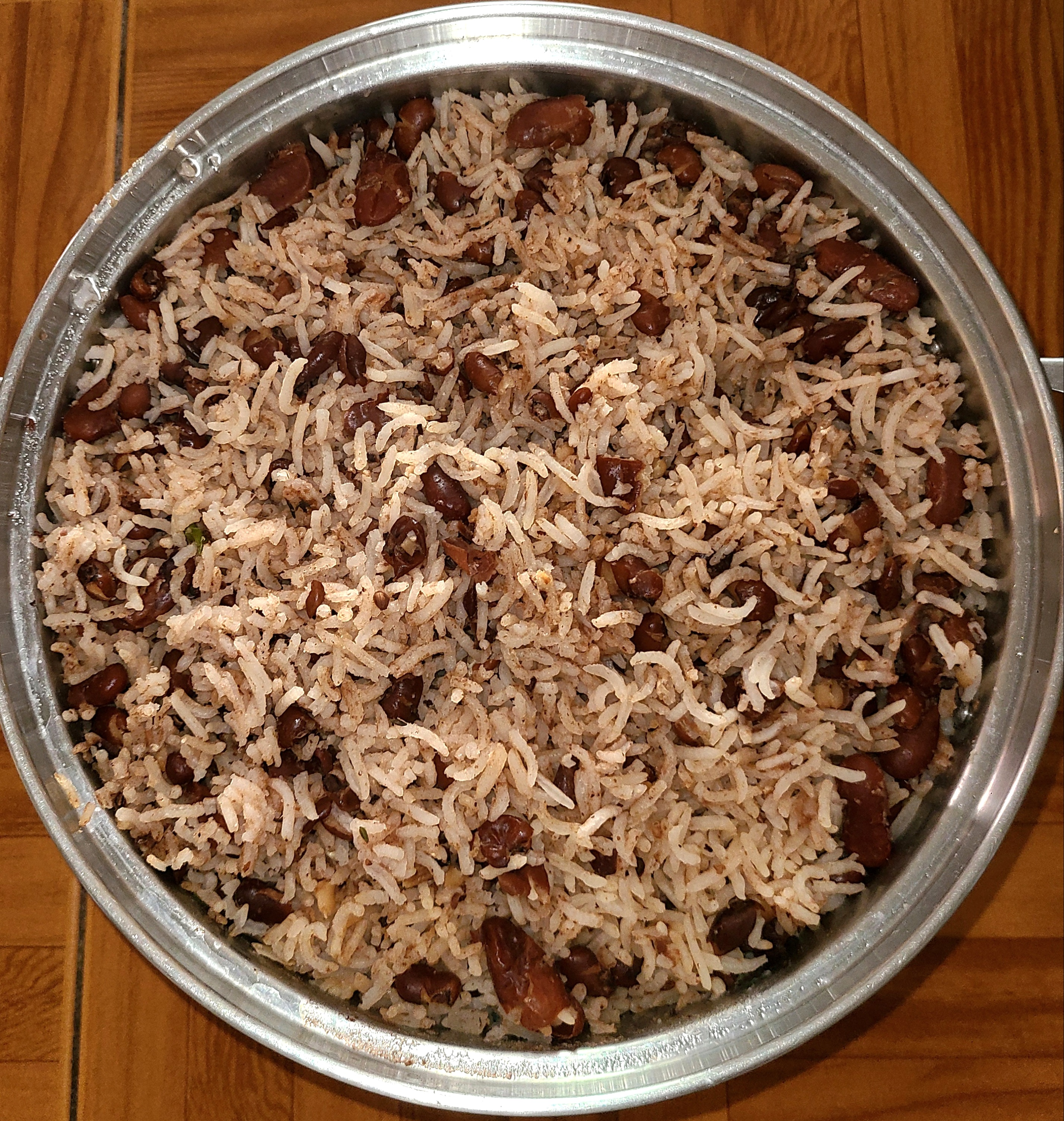
A pot of Jamaican rice and peas

Rice and peas, a one-pot Creole dish that originated in the Caribbean during the colonial era, includes a mixture of ingredients, cooking techniques and spices influenced by various ethnic groups in the region.

The Spanish, the first European arrivals to the Americas, contributed many peas/bean dishes and rice dishes. They also introduced Asian rice to the Caribbean and Latin America, as well as herbs and spices like garlic, thyme, onion, and oregano. Kidney beans, another key ingredient, are thought to have originated in Peru around 8,000 B.C., and other native cultivars including black turtle beans, pinto beans, and lima beans used in the dish, were dispersed throughout the Americas by indigenous Amerindian tribes by 500 B.C., then later the Spanish and Portuguese, who introduced them to other parts of the world. Similarly, the Amerindians cultivated pimento, and they spread Capsicum chinense cultivars throughout the region, including Scotch bonnet and other peppers used in the dish.

The Africans who arrived during slavery and indentureship also influenced the dish, especially with the use of pigeon and cow peas. Along with the Spanish, Portuguese, French, English, Dutch and East Indians, they contributed to the introduction and cultivation of rice in the region. Pigeon peas (also called Congo or Angola peas), which originated in India and were domesticated there 3500 years ago, were also introduced by the Spanish and Portuguese, from Africa. Throughout the Caribbean and Latin America, they are referred to as gandule, guandules or guandu (Spanish and Portuguese), gungo (Jamaican Patois) and pwa kongo or pwa di bwa (French Creole)— which were possibly derived from Bantu dialects, ngungu or wandu (Kongo) and oanda (Angolan Kimbundu).

The name "rice and peas" was originally used by Jamaicans to identify the dish. In 1961, Frederic G. Cassidy said the dish had been referred to as Jamaica's coat of arms. The recipe is said to have spread throughout Central America, by enslaved and free Africans and Creoles who migrated to the area with British settlers, as well as merchants and labourers from Jamaica, between the mid-17th and 20th centuries.

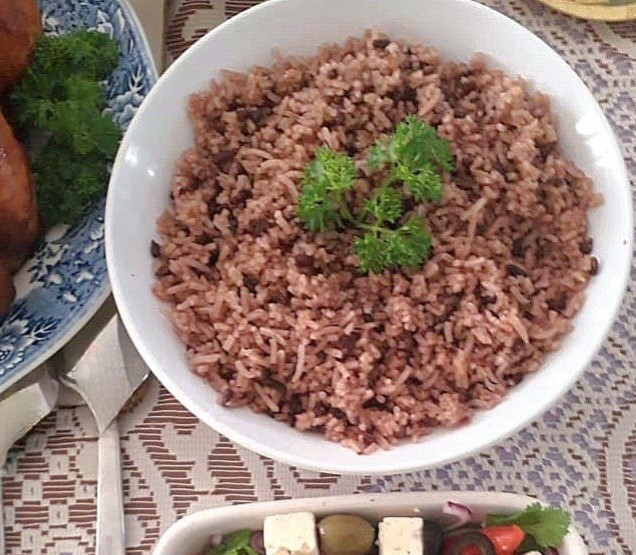
Jamaican Christmas side dish—"rice and (Jerusalem) peas". This native cultivar of peas is tiny, but it gives the rice a rich colour and flavour.

== Variations and similar dishes ==
=== Caribbean ===
Jamaica

Rice and peas from Jamaica is one of the most popular variations from the region. It is typically eaten as a side dish, often accompanied with meats or seafood. Jamaican rice and peas has been introduced to other parts of the world by the diaspora, and is eaten in other countries outside of the Caribbean. In Jamaica, the dish is especially prepared on Sundays for dinner. Kidney beans and other similar cultivars like round reds are normally used to prepare the dish; however, pigeon peas (gungo peas) and Jerusalem peas (Phaseolus trinervius) are traditionally cooked during the Christmas season. Other ingredients include Scotch bonnet and pimento, which are native to the island, and long-grain rice, coconut milk, scallion, garlic, salt and pepper, and thyme. Sometimes, cured meat like corned pork or beef is added to rice and peas.

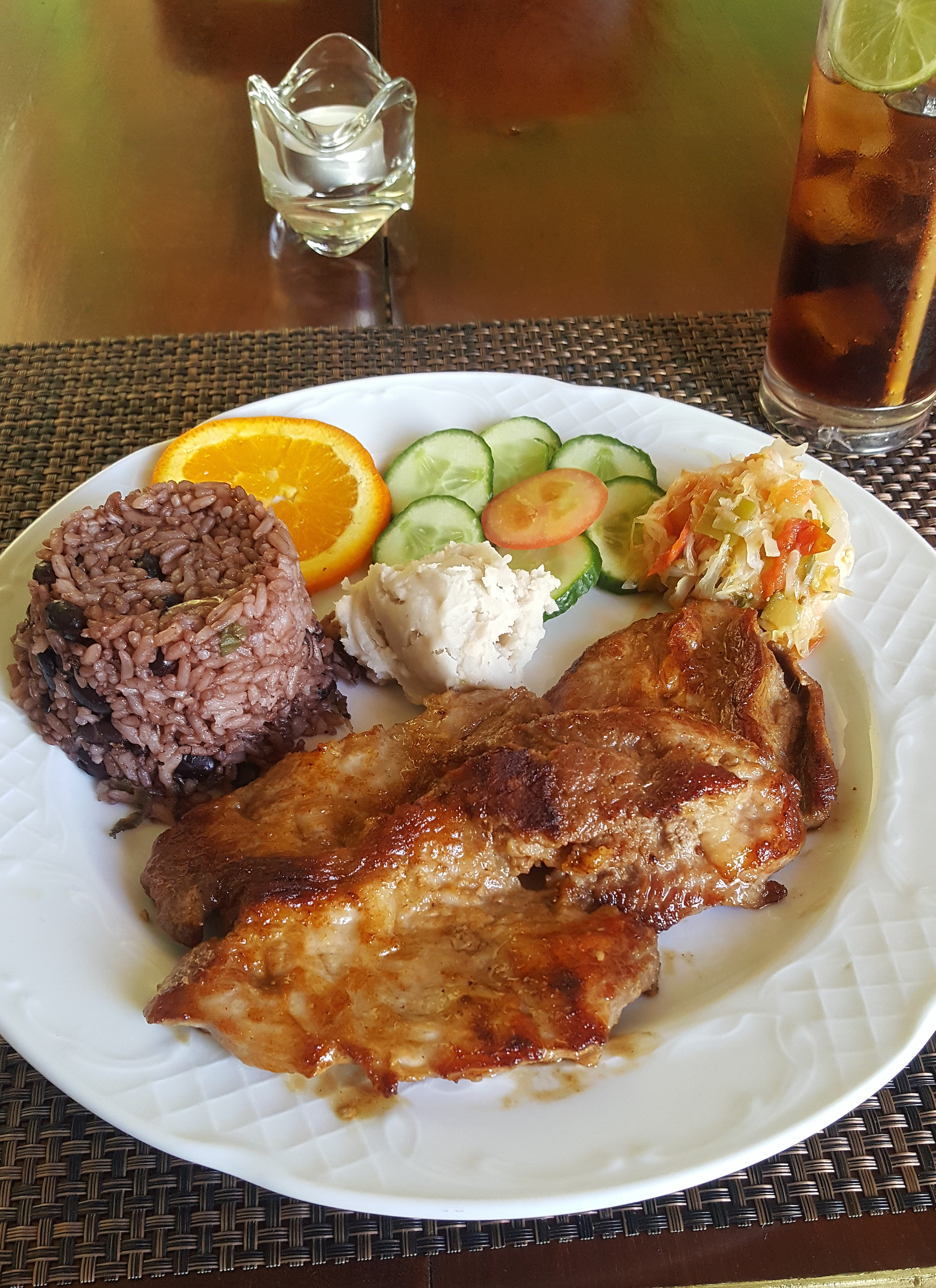
Moros y cristianos served with pork in Cienfuegos, Cuba.

Cuba

Moros y cristianos (also called Moros), which means "Moors and Christians", and congri are Cuban variations. Both side dishes resemble and taste similar to Jamaican rice and peas and Haitian diri ak pwa or kongo; however, some of the ingredients are different. Moros is usually made with black beans, while congri is made with black or red beans— which represent the Islamic Moors, with the rice representing Christian Spaniards. The dish commemorates the Reconquista, and represents how both groups came to live together in the Iberian Peninsula after a long period of battle. According to Cuban historian and anthropologist Fernando Ortiz Fernández, congri was adopted from the Haitians who settled in Cuba during the Haitian Revolution. Other ingredients include onion, bell pepper, garlic, tomato, bay leaf, cumin, oregano and salt. Sometimes, bacon or pork is added.

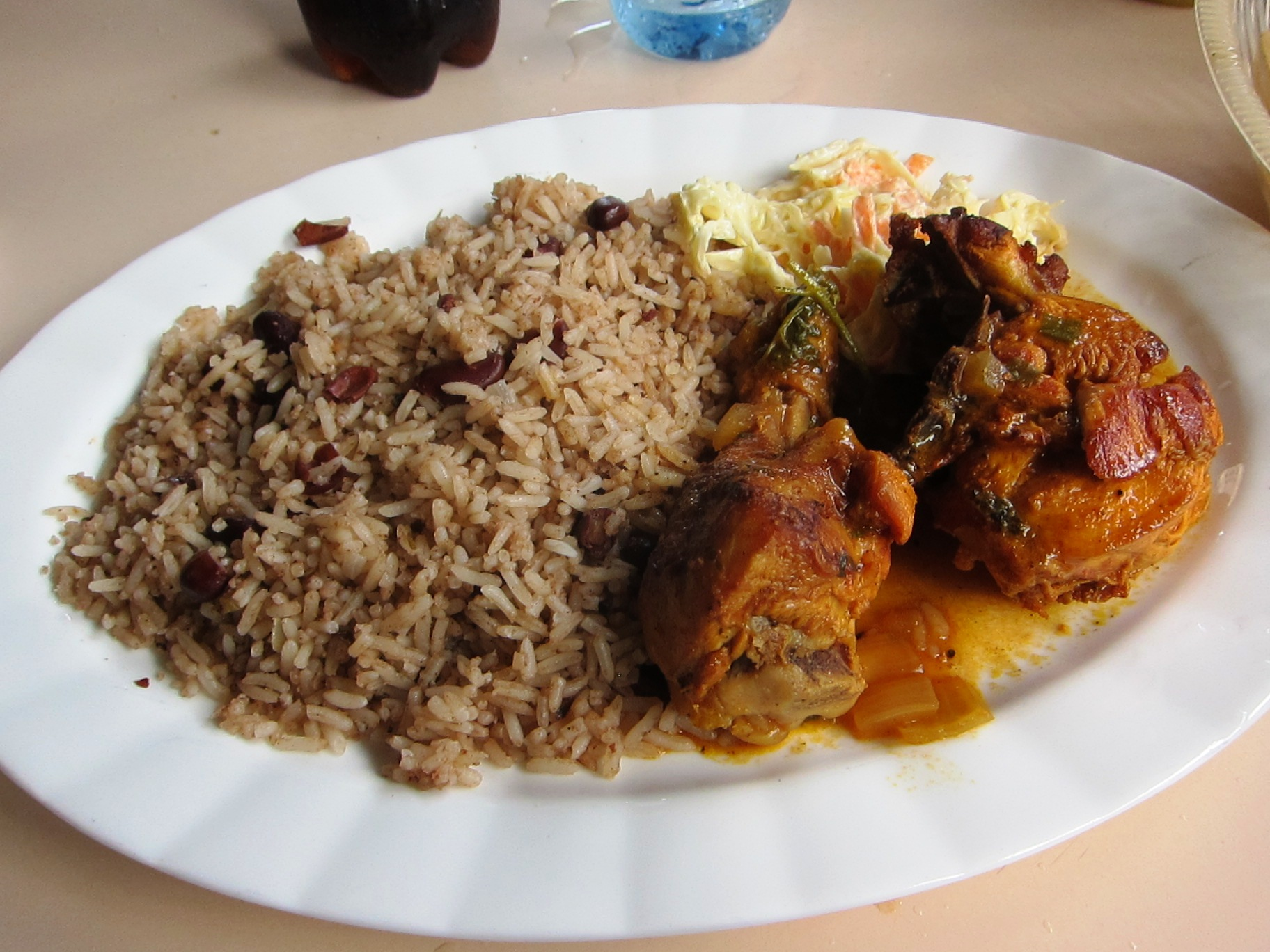
Belizean rice and beans with stew chicken.

Belize

Belizean rice and beans is the national dish of Belize. Its origins can be traced back to the ancient Mayans, who cultivated beans. Over time, influences from other ethnic groups who arrived in the country helped to develop the dish. The recipe originated from the Creole (Kriol) population i.e. British settlers who arrived with African slaves from Jamaica (Baymen), to cut logwood in the late 1700s and 1800s—later intermingling with mestizos and indigenous peoples. It is typically made with kidney beans, and served as a side dish. Other ingredients include garlic, thyme, salt, pepper, long-grain rice, paprika, onion and coconut milk. Salt beef, pigtail or bacon may be added. The dish is very similar to rice and peas from the Greater Antilles and Central American variations. The first Sunday in September is celebrated as National Rice and Beans Day in Belize.

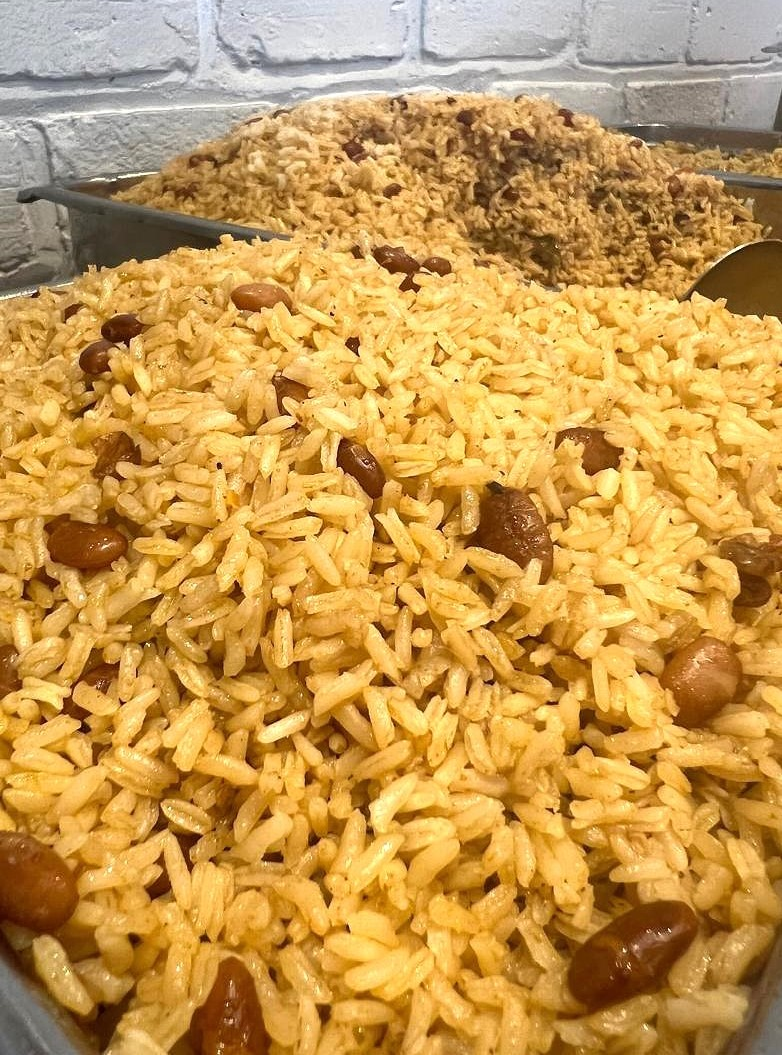
Haitian diri ak pwa rouj (rice and red peas).

Haiti

Diri ak pwa (also known as diri kole) is "rice and peas" in Haitian Kreyol. It is considered to be part of Haiti's national dish along with griot. It is typically made with red beans, black beans or pinto beans. The version with pigeon peas is called diri kole ak pwa kongo, and with lima beans, diri kongri. Haitian variations resemble other Greater Antillean variations. However, ingredients include epis (green seasoning) and/or parsley, thyme, scallion, onion, shallot, cloves, garlic, salt, black pepper, bell pepper, long-grain rice, oil/butter and piment bouc (Bahamian goat pepper) which is sometimes substituted with habanero or Scotch bonnet. Sometimes, coconut milk is added.

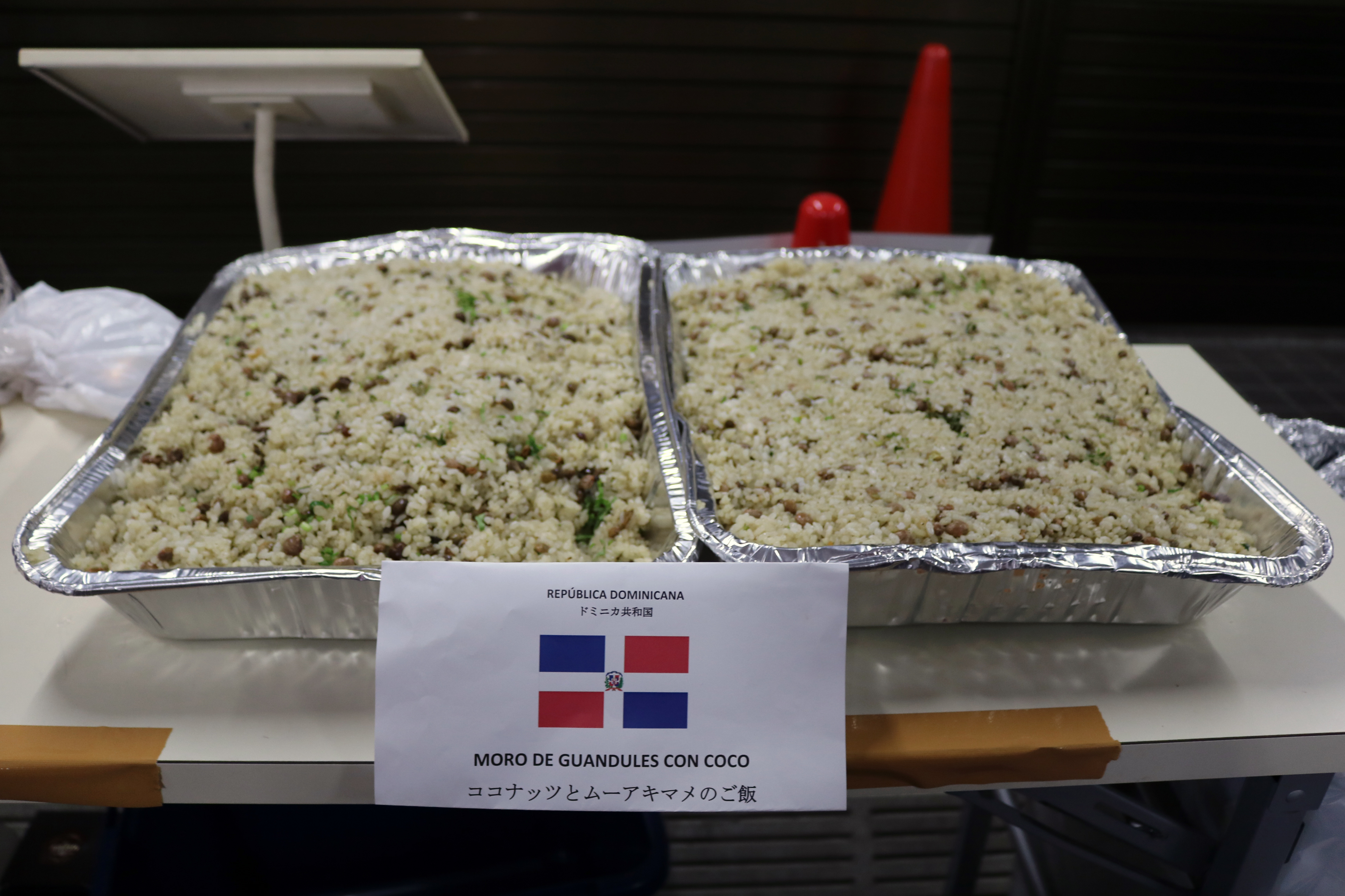
Dominican Christmas side dish— Moro de guandules (rice and pigeon peas).

Dominican Republic

Moro de guandules and moro de guandules con coco are two Dominican variation. It is eaten as a side dish, and both made with pigeon peas. The dish is traditional Dominican Christmas food. Moro de guandules is made with garlic, cubanelle, cilantro, long-grain rice, celery, red onion, stick oregano, and tomato paste. When coconut milk is added it is known as moro de guandules con coco. Both dishes may include, chicken bouillon, culantro and aji dulce. Moro de habichuelas rojas is the version made with kidney beans.

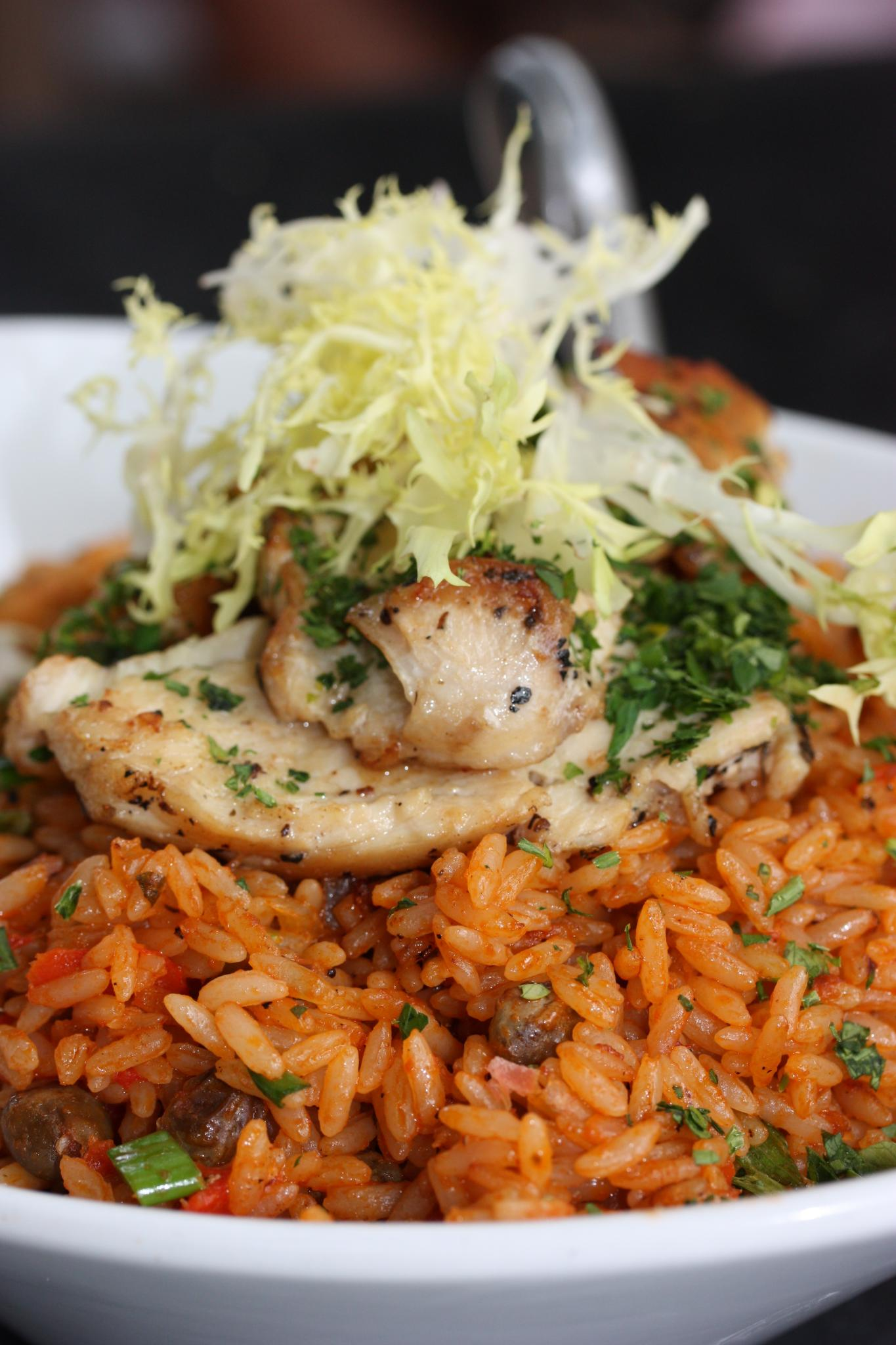
Puerto Rico's national dish— Arroz con gandules (rice and pigeon peas).

Puerto Rico

Arroz con gandules is Puerto Rico's national dish which is typically served with roasted pork.. It is an important part of Puerto Rican Christmas and special occasions. It is typically made with rice, pigeon peas, sazón (turmeric, cumin, coriander seeds, black pepper, annatto), olive oil, sofrito (bell peppers, cubanelle, cilantro, onion, garlic, aji dulce, culantro, and oregano brujo), alcaparrado (manzanilla olives, capers, and pimiento), banana leaf, broth, avocado leaf, bay leaf, tomato paste and mashed plantain or green banana. Salt pork, ham, bacon, salchichón (salami) or chorizo may be added. Other Puerto Rican rice and peas dishes are arroz junto, which consists of similar ingredients, and arroz mamposteao, which is usually made with kidney beans and similar ingredients, but the preparation is similar to Colombian calentao.

The Bahamas & Anguilla

The dish is known as peas n' rice, from which the Bahamian folk song "Mamma don't want no Peas n' Rice and Coconut Oil" is named. The main components of this dish are rice, pigeon peas, onion, sweet pepper, thyme, browning, garlic, tomatoes, tomato paste, salt, pepper and celery. Sometimes, pork (bacon/salted pork), lime juice and coconut milk are added. The texture of peas n' rice is different from Greater Antillean rice and peas, but more similar to the American Hoppin' John. It is slightly sweeter in flavour than Greater Antillean versions due to the use of tomato paste or ketchup. Peas and rice is the national dish of Anguilla, which is also made with pigeon peas, but is more similar in texture to Jamaican rice and peas (with gungo).

Lesser Antilles

Peas and rice (also peas n' rice), pigeon peas and rice or rice and beans is made in other Caribbean islands like Barbados, St Kitts, Grenada, St Lucia and Trinidad. Some of these variations have adopted Jamaica's rice and peas recipes over time, and pigeon peas are typically used. Another Caribbean variation is a traditional Creole dish of the Lesser Antilles called pelau — made mostly in Guadeloupe, Dominica, St Vincent, St Lucia, Trinidad, Grenada and the Virgin Islands. Pigeon peas or cowpeas are typically used, and meat is included. It is similar to cook-up rice from Guyana.

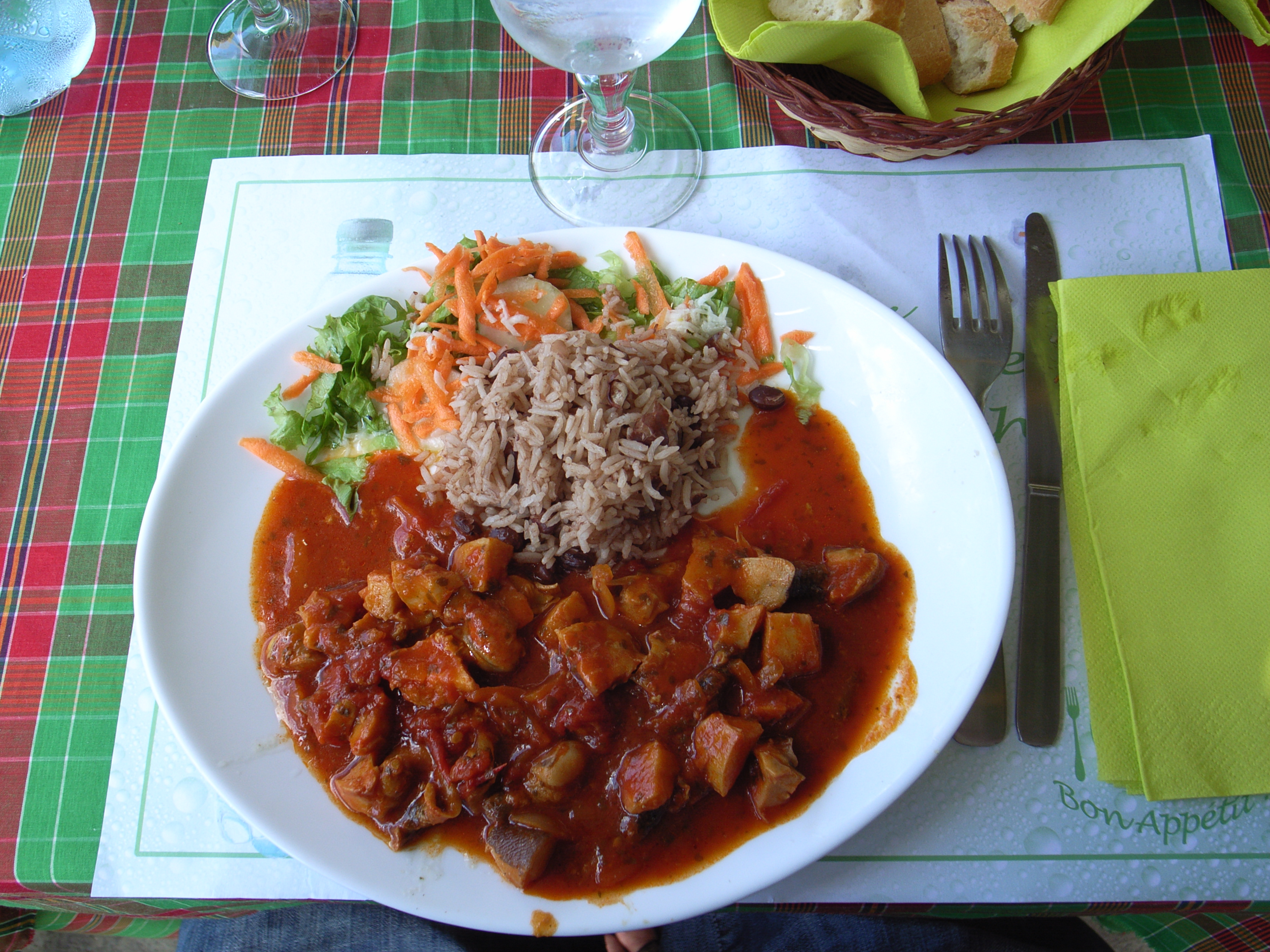
French Caribbean riz et pois d'angole or diri pwa di bwa (rice and pigeon peas) served with fricassée conch.

French Antilles

Riz et pois d'angole, riz aux pois du bois or diri pwa di bwa (rice and pigeon peas in French and Antillean Creole) is made in the French Caribbean islands of Guadeloupe and Martinique. The dish is eaten during Christmas. The version with kidney beans is called riz haricots rouges (red bean rice) in Guadeloupe, or riz créole aux haricots rouges (Creole rice with red beans) in Martinique. In St Martin, the dish is also called pois et riz (peas and rice) or les gan-dules moro. These variations are similar to Greater Antillean rice and peas. Immigration to St Martin brought new recipes with red beans, black beans and black-eyed peas.

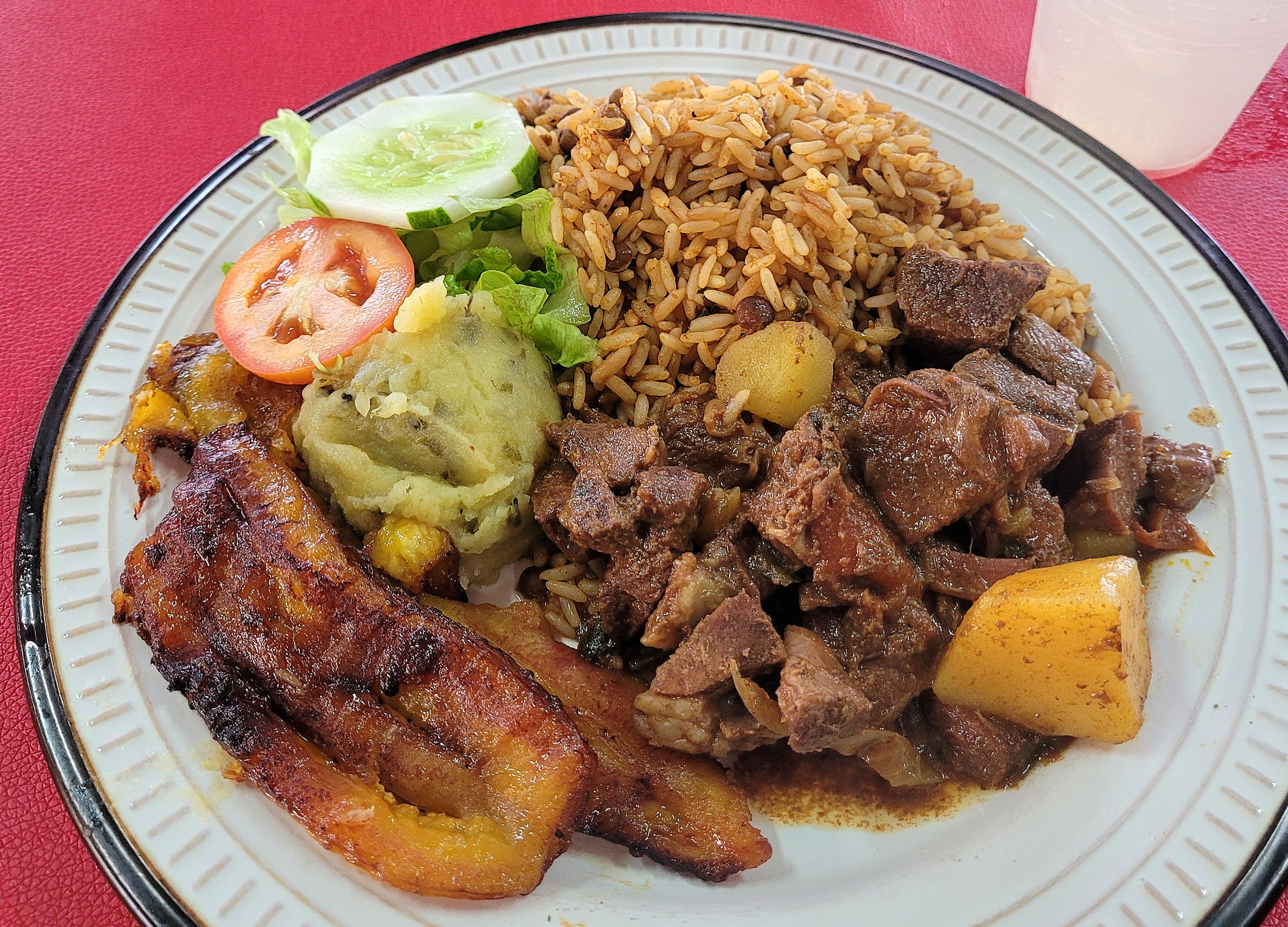
Dutch Caribbean dish— Karni stoba (meat stew) served with arros moro (rice and beans), at Plasa Bieu, Curacao.

Netherlands Antilles (Leeward Antilles)

Antilliaanse arros moro (Antillean rice and beans) is typically made with kidney beans, and is eaten as a side dish in the Dutch Caribbean islands of Aruba, Bonaire and Curacao. Other ingredients include tomato purée, long-grain rice, garlic, coriander, onion, stock, butter/oil and dark soy sauce or ketjap manis.

=== Latin America ===
Nicaragua & Costa Rica

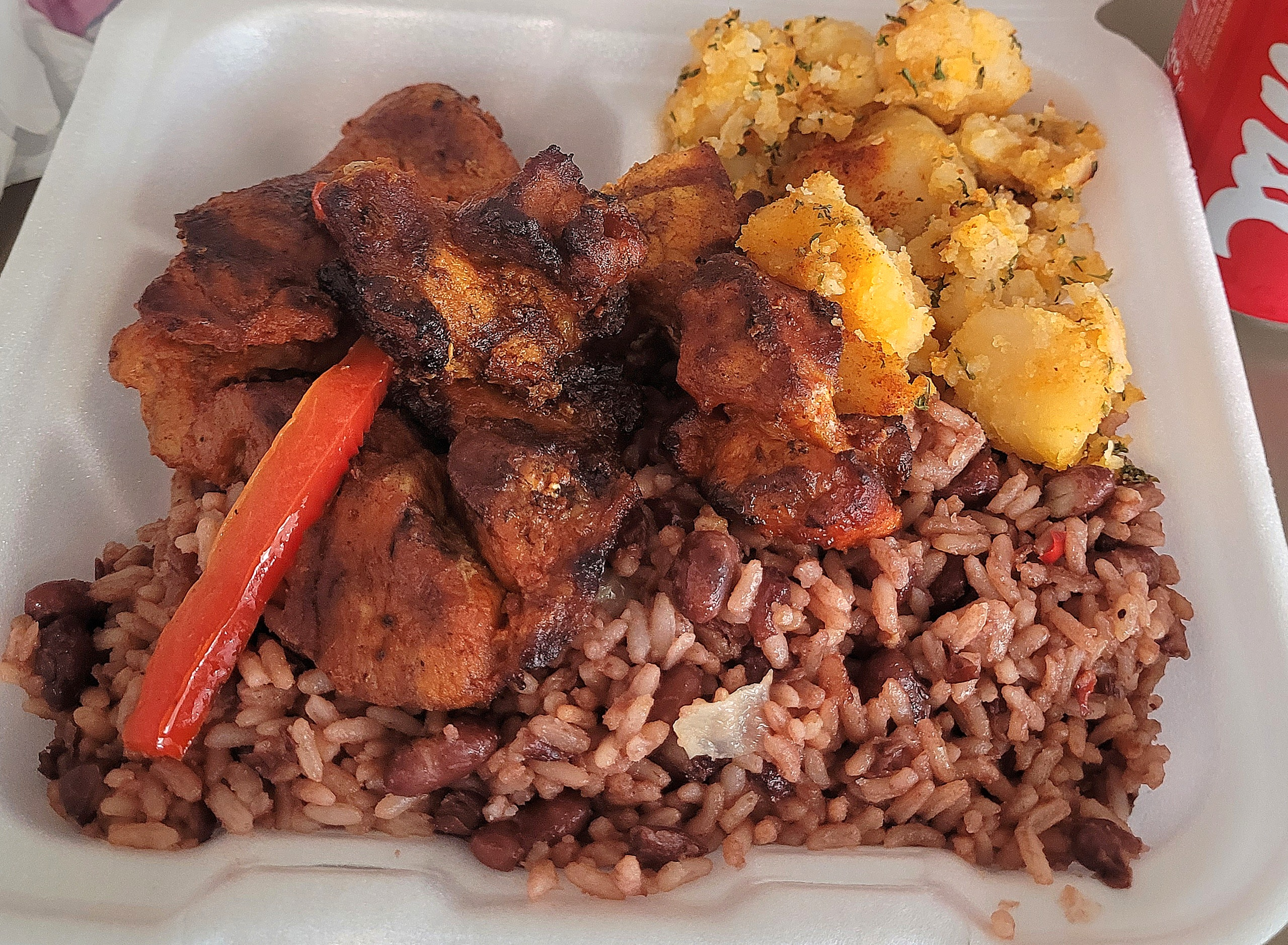
Nicaraguan meal with gallo pinto.

Gallo pinto which means "spotted rooster" in Spanish, is a Central American variation made mainly in Nicaragua and Costa Rica. It is the national dish of both countries, and is typically made with black or red beans in Costa Rica, while in Nicaragua red beans are used. In both countries, the dish may be eaten for breakfast, lunch or dinner. The historical origins of gallo pinto can be traced back to Afro-Caribbean people, specifically Jamaicans. In the 1800s, Jewish Jamaicans, most notably the Lindo brothers who were merchants and planters, migrated to Costa Rica and established businesses in agriculture (coffee, sugar, rice, banana and other produce).

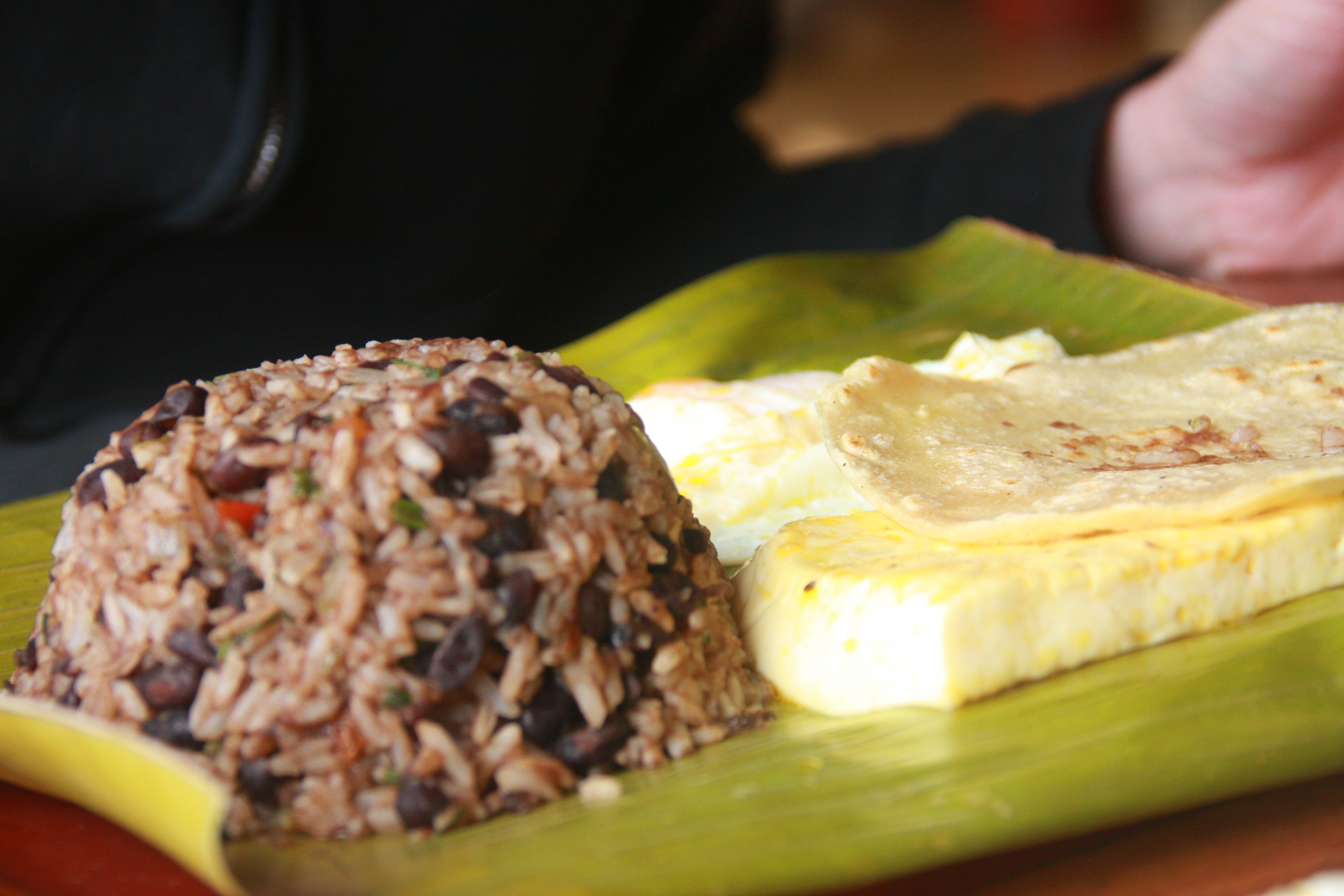
Costa Rican gallo pinto served at a restaurant, in Alajuela, Costa Rica.

According to the book Mamita Yunai by Carlos Luis Fallas, Costa Ricans and Nicaraguans worked together on banana plantations, on the Caribbean coast of Costa Rica where gallo pinto was a staple dish— introduced by emancipated African slaves from Jamaica, who worked on the banana plantations too. As such, Nicaraguans took the Caribbean recipe back to Nicaragua, while Costa Ricans brought the recipe to the Central Valley and made it a traditional meal there. Further, the Jamaican Jews who arrived in the 19th century, integrated with the local population and settled in Cartago, San Jose and Puerto Limon. Many Afro-Jamaicans also went to Costa Rica to work in the construction of the Atlantic Railroad and port— thus, they brought their culture, dialect and culinary practices with them, including rice and peas. It is also believed that Afro-Jamaicans and Creole-Jamaicans who settled in coastal Nicaragua (Mosquito Coast) during the mid-17th, 18th and 19th centuries contributed the dish to coastal Central America.

Panama

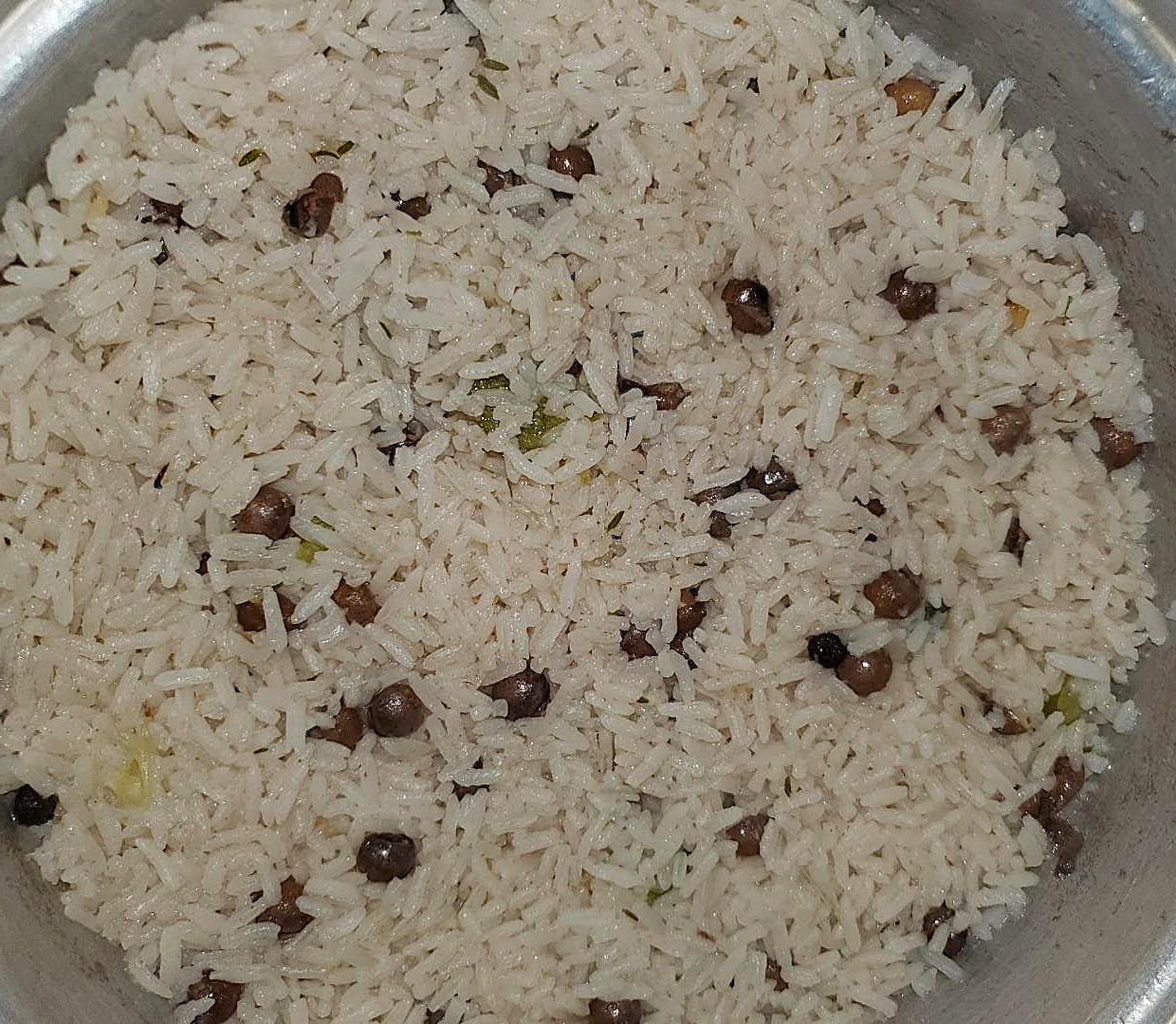
Arroz con guandú—rice and (gungo) peas.

Gallo pinto, also called arroz con frijoles rojos (rice and red beans) is also a Panamanian dish. It is typically made with kidney or pinto beans and includes pigtail. Another variation is arroz con guandú (also called arroz navideño meaning "Christmas rice"), which is made with pigeon peas, and is similar to Jamaican rice and (gungo) peas and Puerto Rican arroz con gandules— typically eaten at family celebrations and on holidays, such as Christmas. Both dishes are especially popular on Panama's Caribbean coast, in the provinces of Colón and Bocas del Toro. The recipes were adopted from Afro-Antillean people, specifically Jamaicans, who migrated to Panama in waves, between the mid-1840s and 1940s, to work on banana plantations in Central America, as well as, to build the Panama Railway and Panama Canal. Jews from Jamaica and Curacao, also migrated to Panama during the mid-19th century— most of whom engaged in commerce, owning factories. Many of those who migrated stayed and integrated, thus influenced the country's cuisine, music and dialect.

Honduras & El Salvador

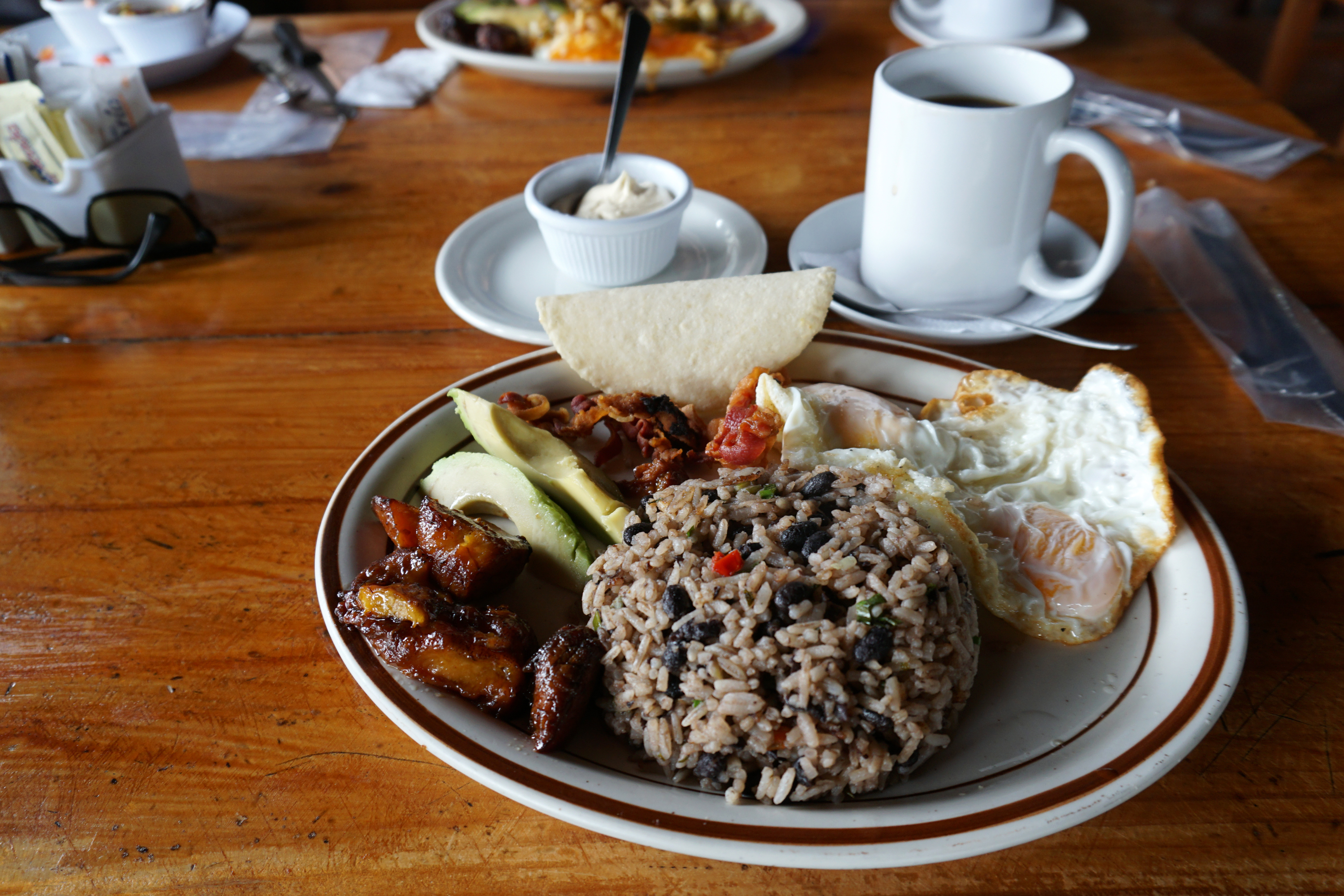
Casamiento— rice and beans eaten in Honduras and El Salvador

Casamiento which means "marriage", describes the combination of rice and red beans as one dish. It is a typical dish eaten on the second Friday of Lent, and generally eaten as a side dish especially along the Caribbean coast and Bay Islands region of Honduras. In El Salvador, casamiento is usually eaten as a traditional breakfast. The dish's roots can be traced to the Anglo-Antilleans, who migrated to the area with English settlers, during the 18th and 19th centuries. As was the case with Nicaragua, under British occupation, several contingents of Afro-Antillean and Creole people, mainly from Jamaica, Belize and the Cayman Islands arrived on the islands and along La Mosquitia, to work in agriculture (mainly banana production) and later to build railroads and ports.

The origin of casamiento in El Salvador is unclear, but it is likely that the recipe may have spread from neighbouring Central American countries. Slaves from Belize fled to El Salvador, after slavery was abolished in 1825, eventually integrating with locals. However, though El Salvador did not experience Afro-Antillean migration like other parts of the region, elements of Afro-Caribbean culture were still adopted. Casamiento is considered to be a fusion of ingredients (beans and rice) from the indigenous Mesoamericans and Spanish respectively, with African influences in the preparation of the dish.

Guatemala

Guatemalan rice and beans is Guatemala's version of rice and peas, which is also made with kidney beans and coconut milk cooked with rice. This one-pot dish which is popular along the country's Caribbean coast, originated from the Creole population that arrived in contingents. In the 18th century, Creole slaves who came from Jamaica, Cuba and Puerto Rico went to Guatemala. Also, after the abolition of slavery in El Salvador, slaves from Belize fled across the borders into Guatemala and Honduras. Further, in the 19th and early 20th centuries, Afro-Antilleans from nearby Caribbean islands, such as Jamaica, were brought in to work on banana plantations and farms, primarily for the United Fruit Company, as well as, in the construction of railroads, and the whaling industry. Another contingent of Antilleans were the Garifunas from St Vincent, who were exiled in Roatan by British settlers. They spread to Guatemala, along with other settlers, and have since lived along the Bay of Amatique, particularly in Livingston. Consequently, coastal Guatemala has retained attributes of Caribbean culture, including dishes such as rice and beans (in English).

San Andrés, Providencia and Santa Catalina, Colombia

Rice and beans is also a dish in San Andrés, Providencia and Santa Catalina, Colombia. The dish is identical to Jamaican rice and peas, made with kidney beans, and is one of several Jamaican dishes adopted— along with the dialect and other cultural attributes. In the 1600s, this Colombian department was a British territory, where plantations were established and English settlers engaged in privateering. After occupation by the Spanish and Portuguese, English buccaneers led by Henry Morgan, took over the islands, which were used as a base to attack Panama. The islands were occupied by mostly English Protestants, who first arrived from Barbados, in the 17th century, and slaves mainly from Jamaica who worked in lumbering, cotton and tobacco cultivation. By the 20th century, Anglo/Afro-Caribbean people had migrated to the islands, as well as, coastal Latin America for employment— thus, majority of the population (the Raizal) has a strong Caribbean heritage, hence the dish's roots.

Colombia

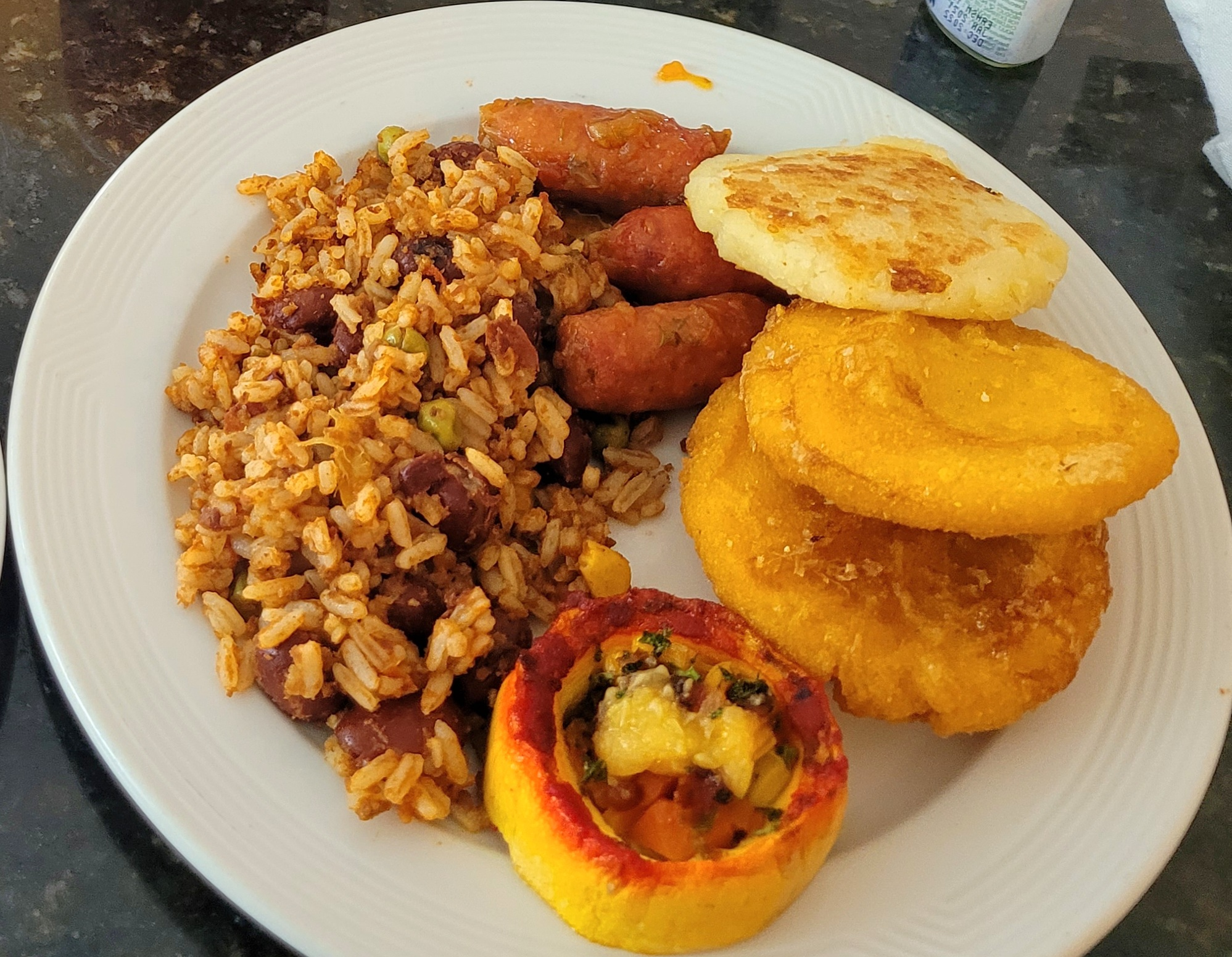
Calenta'o served with arepas and other accompaniments for breakfast, in Cartagena, Colombia.

In Colombia, calenta'o which means "heated" or "warmed up" (in Criolla), or calentado (in Spanish), is a rice and beans dish traditionally eaten for breakfast. It differs from rice and peas, as the dish is made from leftover beans and rice, but similar in that they are combined. The dish which is from Antioquia and the Coffee Zone, is believed to be a colonial era dish—created by African slaves repurposing leftovers of their Spanish masters' food. Calenta'o is a versatile dish, which may be served with other accompaniments such as eggs and arepas.

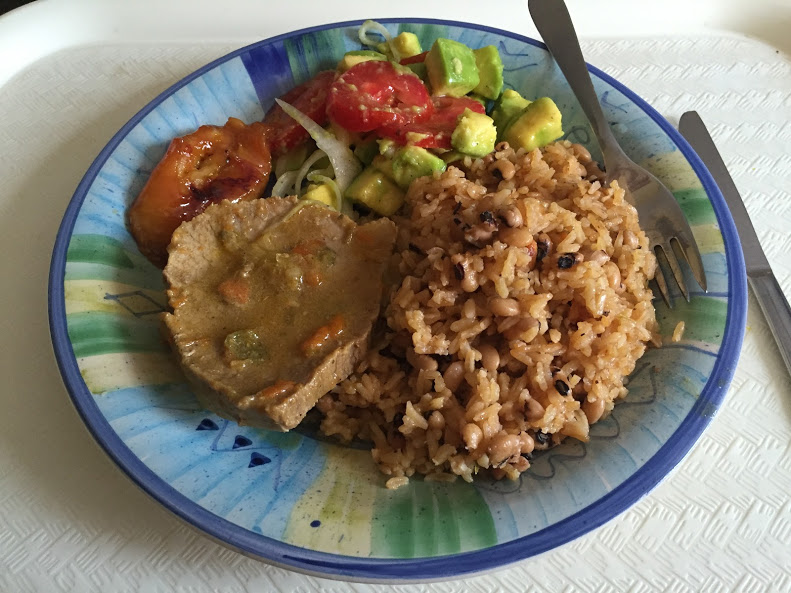
Colombian arroz de fríjol cabecita negra with accompaniments.

Arroz de fríjol cabecita negra (black head bean rice) is a dish made with rice and black-eyed peas, from Colombia's Caribbean coast. The dish is popular in Cartagena, and is eaten in other coastal states. It resembles the American Hoppin' John, Brazilian baião de dois and Haitian diri ak pwa with black-eyed peas. Sometimes, coconut milk is added. It is believed to be a colonial era dish. Other variations which are similar to rice and peas, called arroz con frijoles (rojos, negros and morados) are also made in coastal Colombia.

Venezuela

Palo a pique llanero is a one-pot dish which includes rice, beans and meat. It dates back to the 19th century, and originated in the Venezuelan Los Llanos plain. The dish is also made in Guyana. It can be made with kidney beans or frijoles bayos (bay beans), and is similar to pelau made in Trinidad and other Lesser Antillean islands, and Guyanese cook-up rice with black-eyed peas (typically eaten on New Year's Eve/Old Year's Night).

In Venezuela, arroz con caraotas (rice with beans) is another dish made with rice and beans combined. It resembles Cuban moros y cristianos and arroz congri, as well as, other Greater Antillean and Central American variations of rice and peas/beans. The dish is typical of coastal Venezuela, and has indigenous, African and Spanish influences. Like the other Latin countries mentioned, Venezuela also experienced waves of Antillean migration, which could explain the similarities.

Brazil

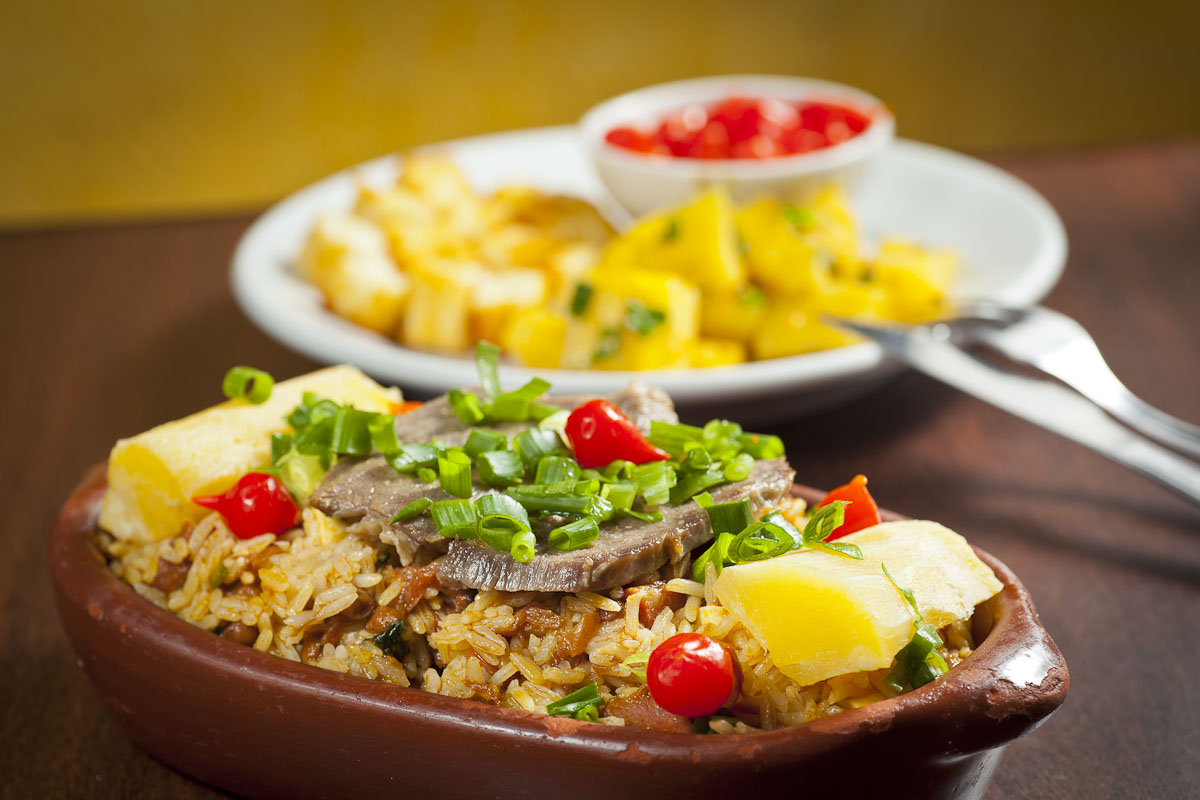
Brazilian baião de dois— a typical northeastern rice and peas dish.

Baião de dois is a Brazilian one-pot dish made from black-eyed peas/pigeon peas or green beans (feijão verde), and rice. It is similar to moro de guandules from the Dominican Republic, and arroz con gandules from Puerto Rico. The dish originated in the state of Ceará, and is typical of Brazil's Northeast Region. The name is related to baião, a northeastern style of music and dance (for two), which is a fusion of indigenous Amerindian, African and European influences— like the dish. Dois ("2" in Portuguese) refers to the combination of the two main ingredients i.e. rice and peas. In the mid-20th century, the name became popular with the song Baião de Dois, by composer and Ceará native, Humberto Teixeira, and the "Rei do Baião" (King of Baião), Luiz Gonzaga.

== Gallery ==
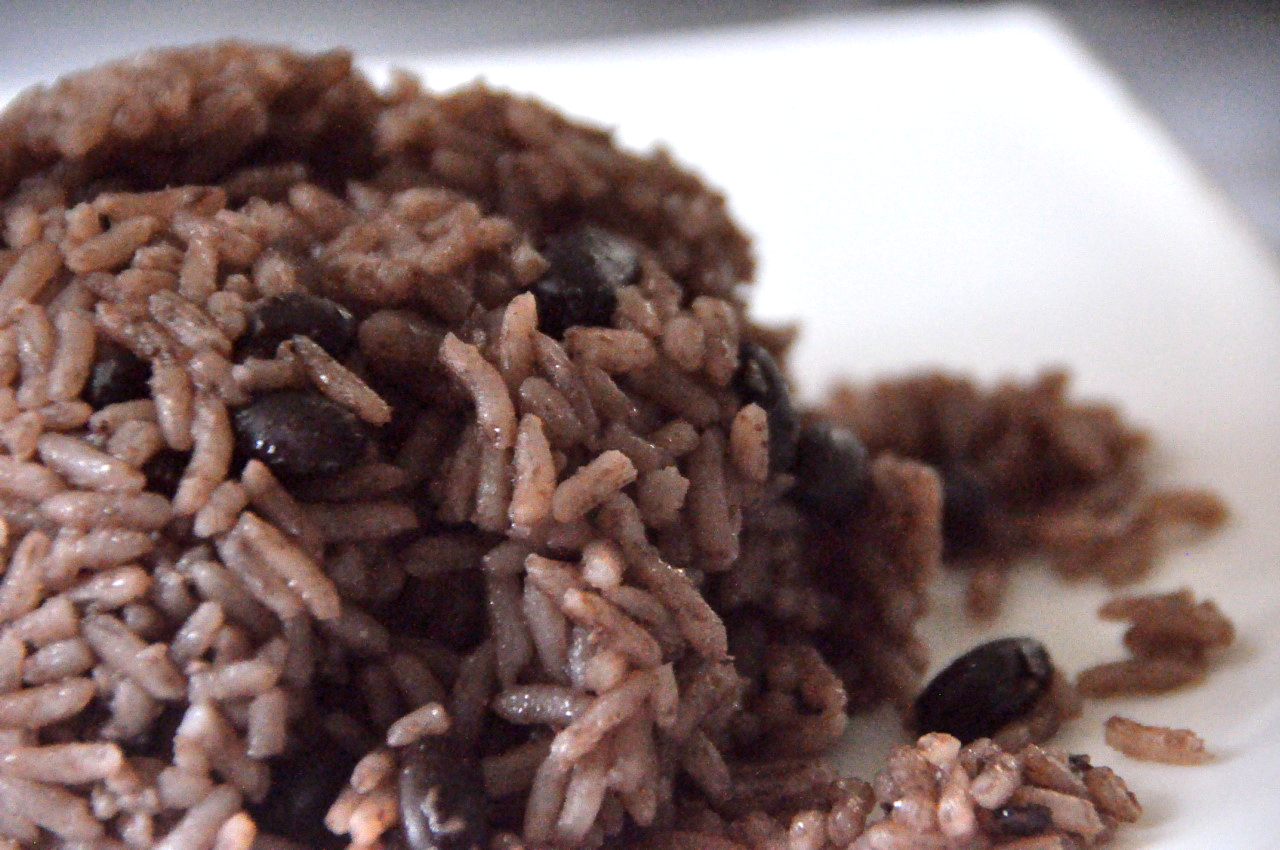
Cuba's moros y cristianos.

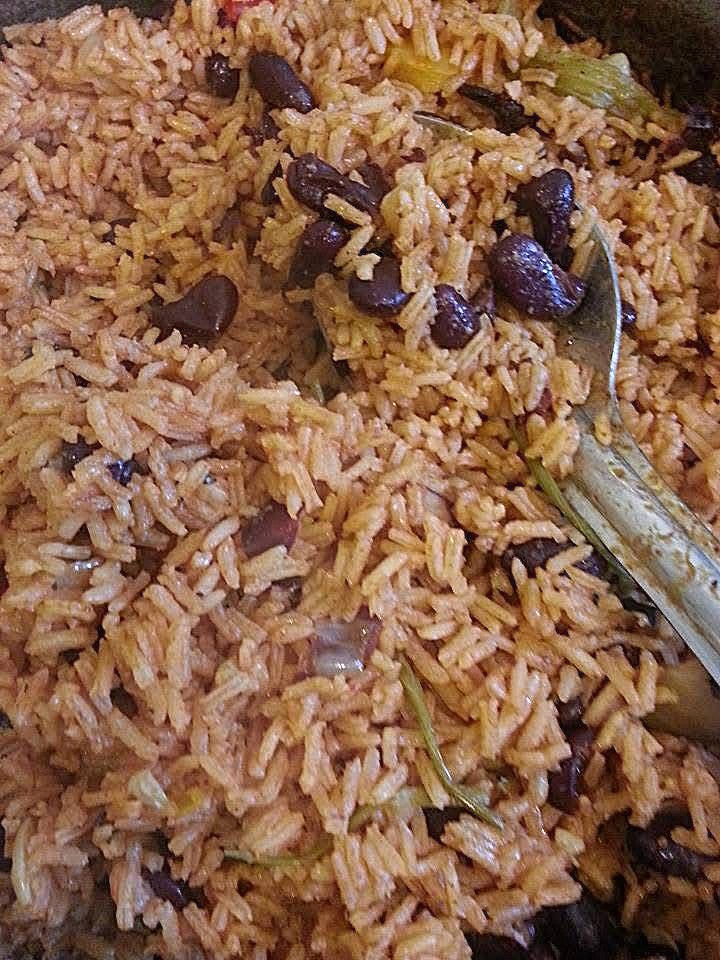
Moro de habichuelas rojas— Dominican rice and (kidney) beans.

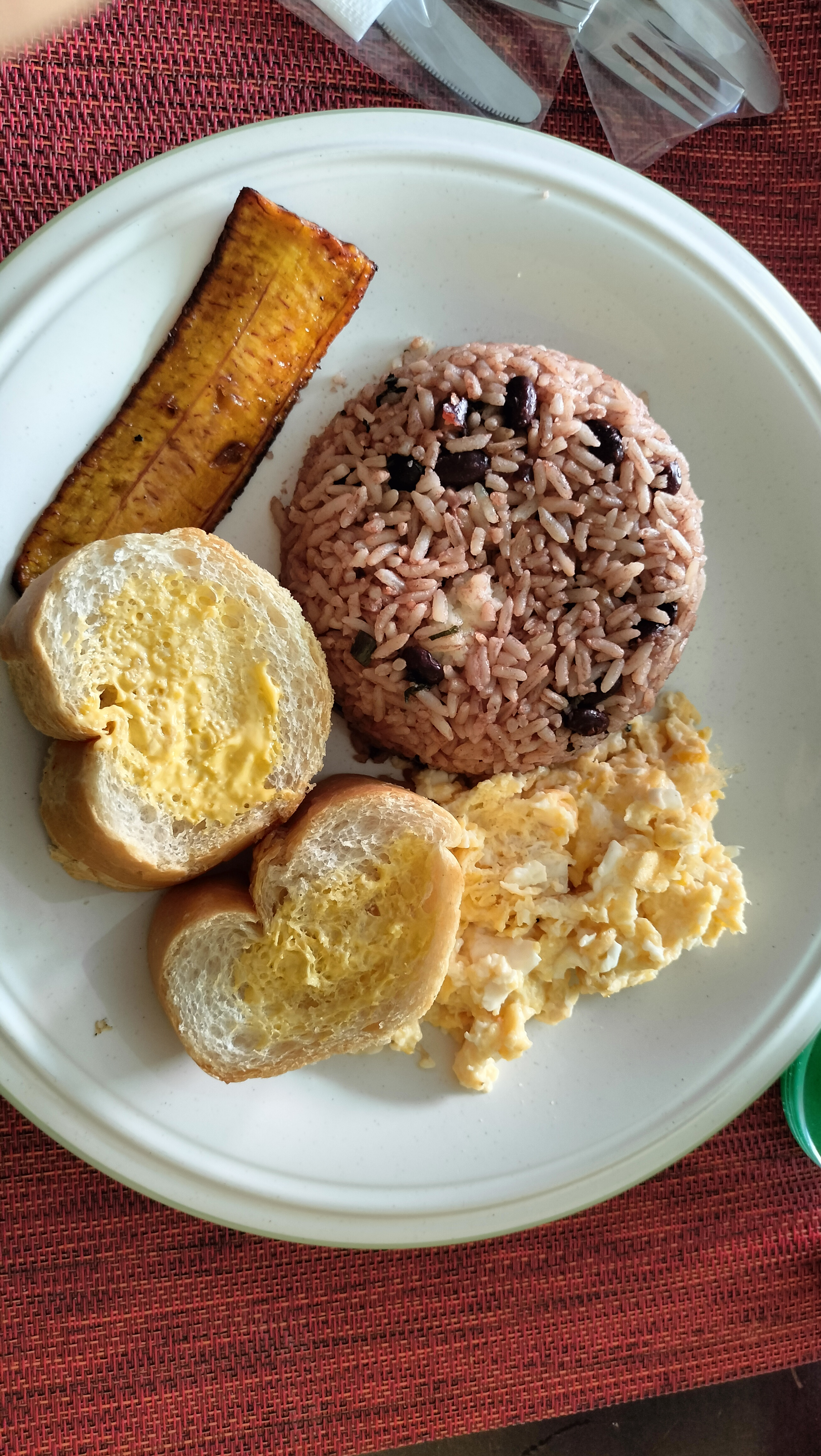
Costa Rican breakfast— gallo pinto served with plantain, egg and bread.

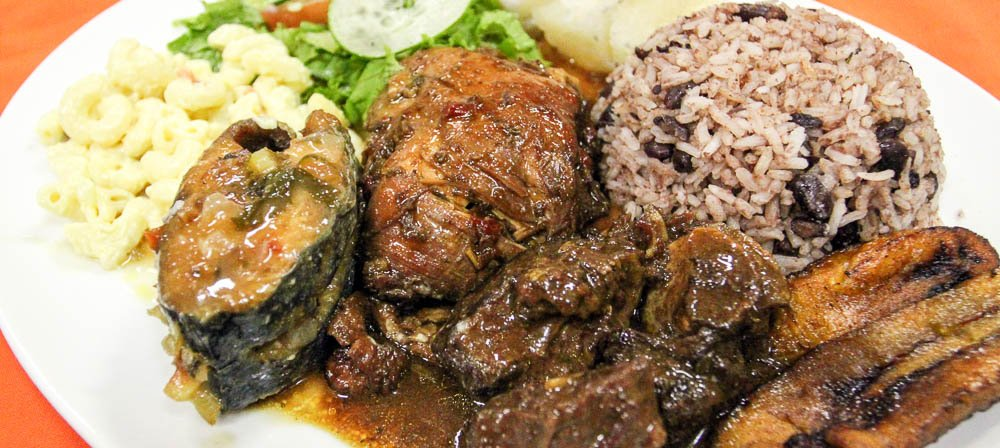
Costa Rican dinner from Puerto Limón (an area with Jamaican descendants)—gallo pinto served with various meats and accompaniments.

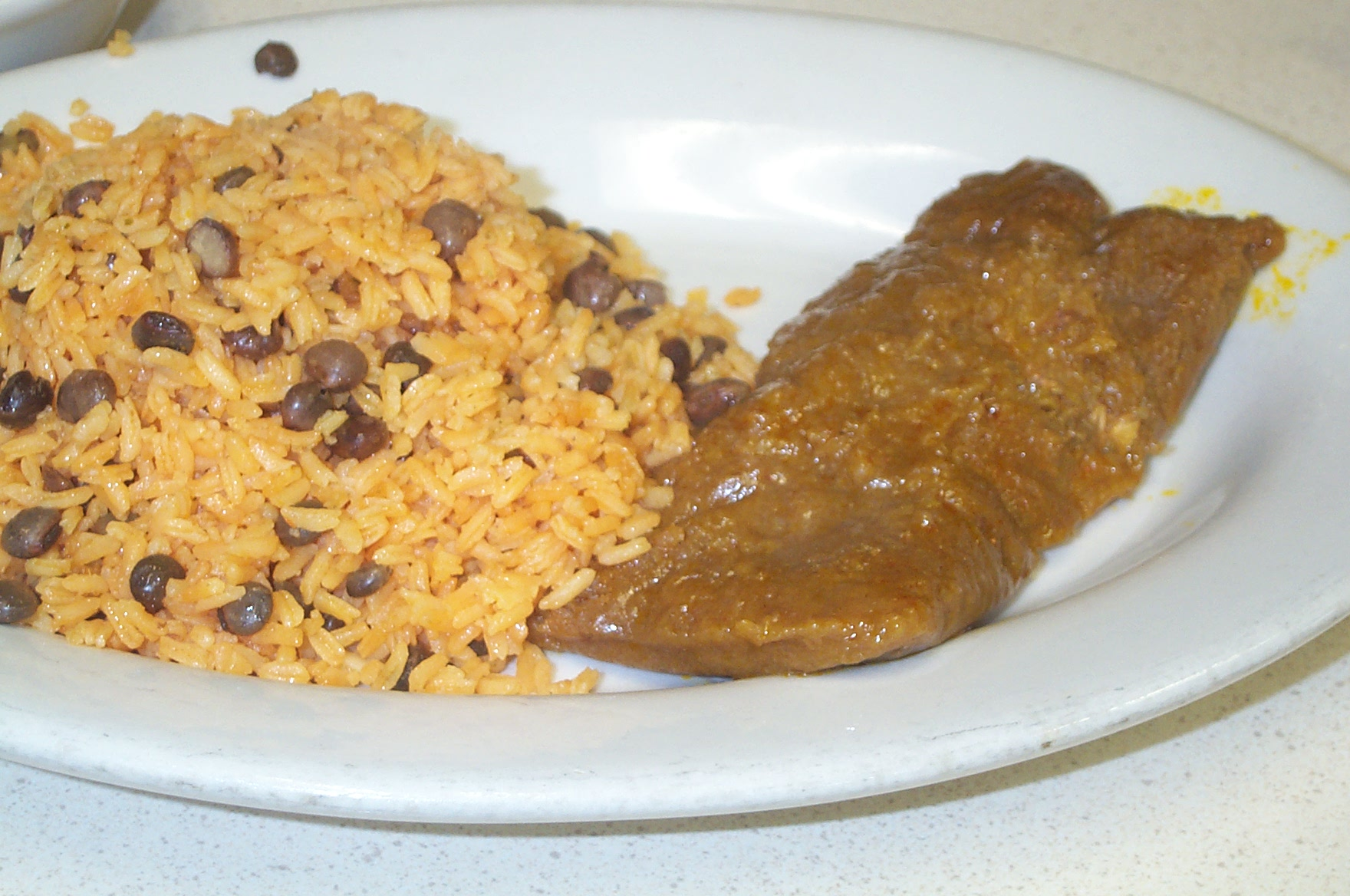
Puerto Rican arroz con gandules and pastel.

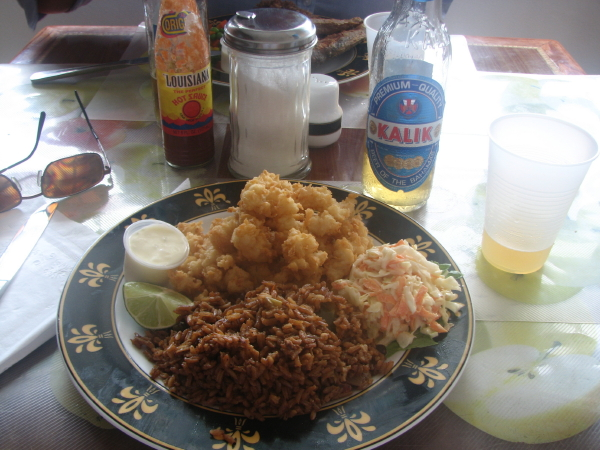
Bahamian peas n' rice served with cracked conch and coleslaw.

== See also ==
- Rice and beans
- Moro de guandules
- Arroz con gandules
- Hoppin' John
- Waakye
- Jamaican cuisine
- List of legume dishes
- List of rice dishes
- Moros y Cristianos (dish)
- Caribbean cuisine
