= Moro de guandules =

Dish common in the Dominican Republic and Puerto Rico

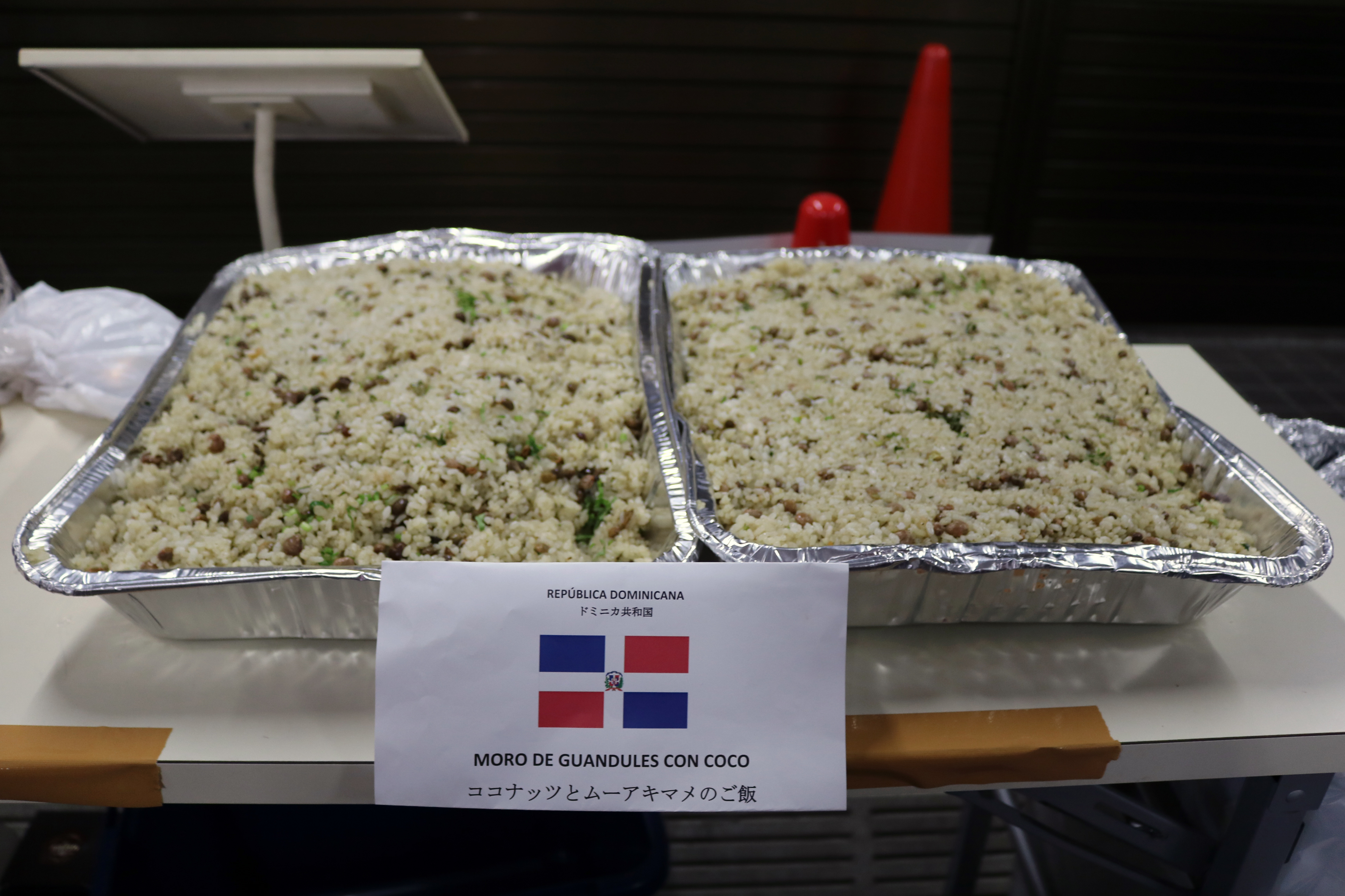
- Place of origin: Dominican Republic
- Main ingredients: Rice, pigeon peas, stick oregano, onion, garlic, tomato, and cubanelle pepper

Moro de guandules (Moorish pigeon peas), is a traditional dish from the Dominican Republic consisting of rice and pigeon peas.

== Description ==
Moro de guandules is a one-pot dish made with long-grain rice, pigeon peas, celery, cubanelle pepper, red onion, garlic, stick oregano, cilantro, and tomato paste.

There are many recipes based on family traditions. While most Dominican family's share the same recipe there are recipes with culantro, ají dulce, vinegar, sour orange, bouillon cube, olives, and capers.

Doña Gallina is popular bouillon cube in Dominican Republic. When coconut milk is added, it is known as moro de guandules con coco.

It is traditionally served on special events and holidays but is cooked throughout the year.

== See also ==
- Arroz con pollo - Rice, chicken, and peas dish
- Arroz con gandules - Puerto Rican one-pot yellow rice, pork, and pigeon pea dish
- Platillo Moros y Cristianos - Cuban one-pot black bean and rice dish
- Gallo pinto
- Pabellón criollo
- Rice and beans
- Rice and peas - Jamaican one-pot coconut milk, rice, and pigeon pea dish
