= Pabellón criollo =

Traditional Venezuelan rice and bean dish

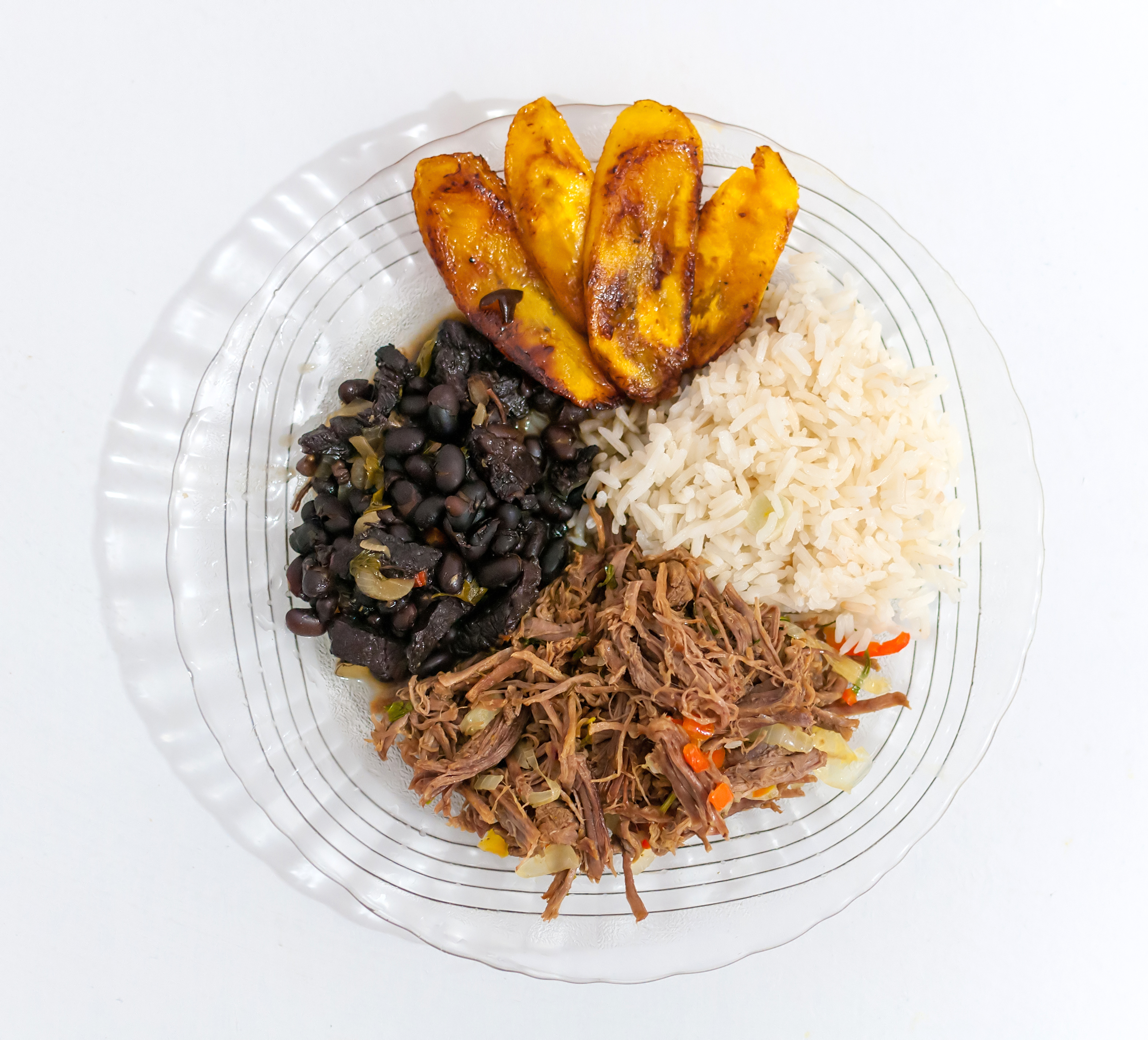
- Pabellón criollo, this is the pabellón con tajadas variation (has fried plantain slices).
- Course: Meal
- Place of origin: Venezuela
- Region or state: Latin America
- Associated cuisine: Venezuelan cuisine
- Cooking time: 40 minutes
- Main ingredients: rice and beans, shredded beef in stew and stewed

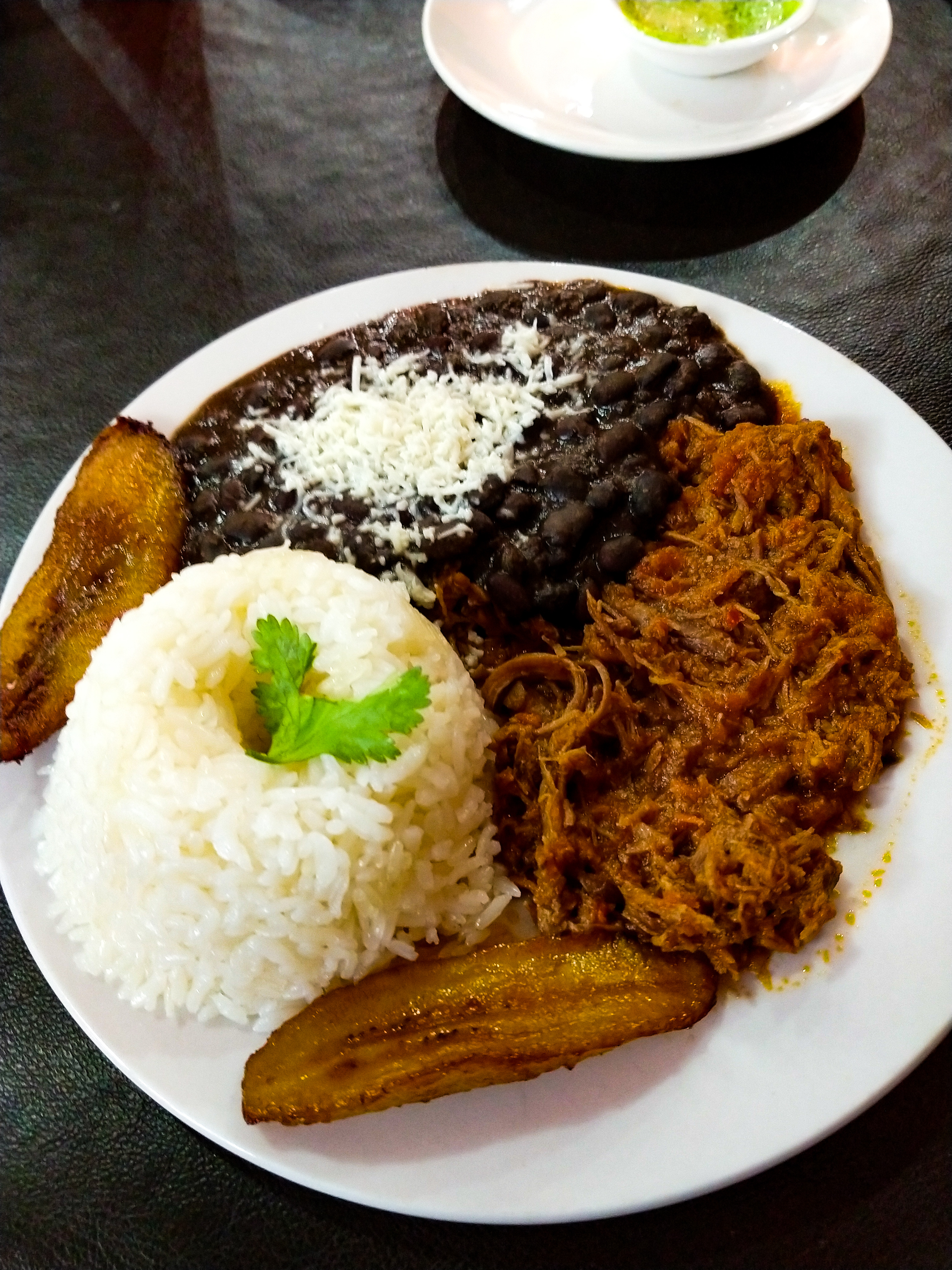
Black beans with grated cheese, shredded meat, slices of plantain and rice

Pabellón criollo (Latin American Spanish pronunciation: [paβeˈʝoŋ ˈkɾjoʝo]) is a traditional Venezuelan dish that is considered the national dish. It mixes elements from the three different cultures that intermixed during Spanish colonial times: Native Americans, Spanish and Africans. It is a plate of rice, shredded beef in stew and stewed black beans. In 2019, the Venezuelan government declared pabellón to be intangible heritage.

== Variants ==
Common additions include tajadas (fried plantain slices) or a fried egg, and both of these variants have acquired slang names. A pabellón con barandas (baranda is Spanish for guard rail) is served with tajadas because the long plantain slices placed on the sides are humorously considered to be keeping the food from falling off from the plate. A pabellón a caballo means with a fried egg on top, as though the egg were "riding" the dish ("a caballo" is Spanish for "on horseback"). Besides these two main variants, people also add other things to the dish such as granulated sugar on the beans, Queso Palmita over the beans or hot sauce over the meat.

The shredded beef can be replaced by chigüire, shredded caiman meat or even freshwater fish depending on the region, time of the year (beef consumption is prohibited by the Roman Catholic Church during Lent; however, capybara and fish are approved) or personal taste.

== Status ==
In 2019, the Venezuelan government classified pabellón as intangible heritage, alongside the dishes arepa, casabe, dulce de lechosa, hallaca, and cachapa.

== See also ==
- Arroz con gandules - similar dish in Puerto Rico
- Platillo Moros y Cristianos - similar dish in Cuba
- Moro de guandules - similar dish in the Dominican Republic
- Ropa vieja - Beef component of the dish is also popular in Cuba
- Gallo Pinto - similar dish in Nicaragua and Costa Rica
- Hoppin' John - similar dish in the Southern United States
- Rice and peas - similar dish in Jamaica
- List of rice dishes
