= Baião de dois =

Brazilian rice and bean dish

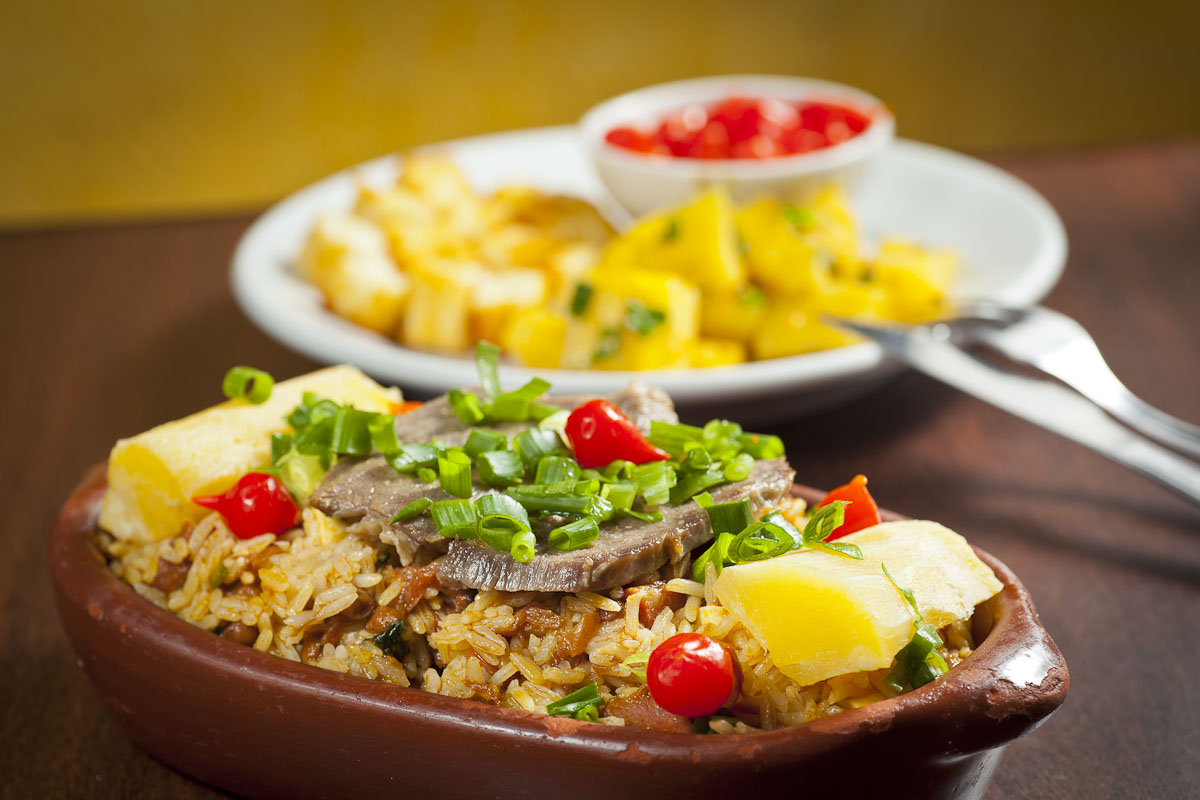
- Baião de dois with dried meat and cassava
- Place of origin: Brazil
- Region or state: Northeast Region, Brazil and North Region, Brazil
- Main ingredients: rice and beans
- Ingredients generally used: queijo coalho, dried meat e cassava

Baião de dois (Central Northeastern Portuguese pronunciation: [bajˈɐ̃w ˈdi ˈdojs]) is a dish originating from the Brazilian state of Ceará, typical of the Northeast Region and parts of the North Region, such as Rondônia, Acre, Amazonas and Pará. It consists of a preparation of rice and beans, preferably Brazilian beans such as "feijão verde" or "feijão novo". It is common to add queijo coalho. Dried meat is not added in Ceará. In Paraíba and in Pernambuco, there is a variant called rubacão, a dish that is very popular in the Sertão.

== Etymology ==
The origin of the name baião de dois is related to baião, a music and dance style typical of the Northeast Region, with the number 2 (dois) referring to the combination forming the base of the dish: rice and beans. The term gained popularity with the song Baião de Dois, a partnership between the composer from Ceará, Humberto Teixeira, with the "Rei do Baião", from Pernambuco, Luiz Gonzaga, in the mid 20th century.

The cearense origin of the delicacy is attested by the folklorist Câmara Cascudo, citing a reference from 1940, Liceu Cearense, by Gustavo Barroso.

Baião, being a mixture of two elements of Brazilian cuisine appreciated and easily accessible, rice and beans, is very common in rural areas. It is commonly made mainly at night so that the rest of the baked beans can be used during the day.

== Preparation methods ==
The rice is cooked with the beans, with the broth already developed, along with other ingredients such as onion, tomato, pepper and spices: coriander and chives. Cheese and cream are also usually added.

== Dominican moro ==
In the Dominican Republic there is a similar dish, called moro, which is also prepared by cooking rice and beans together. Other Latin American countries have similar dishes of rice cooked with beans, such as Moros y Cristianos in Cuba, and arroz con gandules in Puerto Rico.
