= Cleo Brown =

American blues and jazz vocalist and pianist (1909–1995)

Background information
- Born: December 8, 1909; Meridian, Mississippi, U.S.
- Died: April 15, 1995 (aged 85) Denver, Colorado, U.S.
- Genres: Jazz; blues; boogie-woogie
- Occupation: Musician
- Instruments: Piano; Vocals
- Years active: 1923–1980s
- Labels: Decca; Capitol

Cleopatra Brown (December 8, 1909 – April 15, 1995), known as Cleo Brown, C. Patra Brown or Cleo Patra Brown, was an American blues and jazz vocalist and pianist. She was the first woman instrumentalist to receive the NEA Jazz Masters Fellowship.

== Life ==
While Brown's place of birth has been published as Meridian, Mississippi, Brown told W. Balliett in a 1986 interview published in The New Yorker that she was born in De Kalb, Mississippi, shortly before her father took a position as a pastor in Meridian. She played piano in the Baptist church as a child. In 1919, her family moved to Chicago, and she began learning piano from her brother who worked with "Pinetop" Smith, playing boogie-woogie for dances. From around 1923, she worked in vaudeville, as well as taking gigs in clubs. In 1935, she replaced Fats Waller as pianist on New York radio station WABC.

From the 1930s to the 1950s, she toured the United States regularly, recording for Decca Records (among other labels) along the way and recording many humorous, ironic titles such as "Breakin' in a New Pair of Shoes", "Mama Don't Want No Peas an' Rice an' Cocoanut Oil", "When Hollywood Goes Black and Tan", and "The Stuff Is Here and It's Mellow". Her stride piano playing was often compared to Fats Waller, and she is credited as an influence on Dave Brubeck, who played during the intermissions of her shows, and Marian McPartland. She played regularly at clubs in Chicago, toured widely, and recorded for both Decca and Capitol Records.

Brown began to shy away from singing bawdy blues songs because of her deepening religious beliefs, and, in 1953, she was baptized, retired from music, and became a nurse in 1959. Jazz biographies frequently listed her as deceased due to her absence from music. The song "Sweet Cleo Brown" was recorded by Brubeck in tribute to her.

From the mid-1970s until 1981, she performed under the name of C. Patra Brown on radio shows in Denver, Colorado. She replaced boogie-woogie music with slower, inspirational music. She returned to record again, and performed on National Public Radio.

She gave birth to a son, Matthew, and had four grandchildren. She died on April 15, 1995, in Denver, Colorado.

== Discography ==
- Living in the Afterglow (Audiophile, 1989)
- 1935–1951 (Chronological Classics)
