= Arroz con gandules =

Puerto Rican rice and pork dish

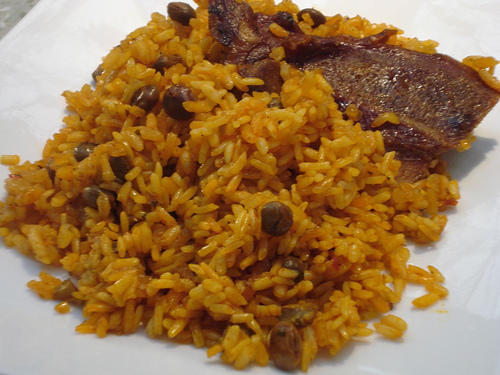
- Course: Dinner
- Place of origin: Puerto Rico
- Region or state: Greater Antilles
- Main ingredients: Medium-grain rice, pigeon peas, sofrito, annatto, and pork

Arroz con gandules is a combination of rice, pigeon peas, and pork, cooked in the same pot with sofrito. This is Puerto Rico's national dish along with roasted pork.

== Preparation ==
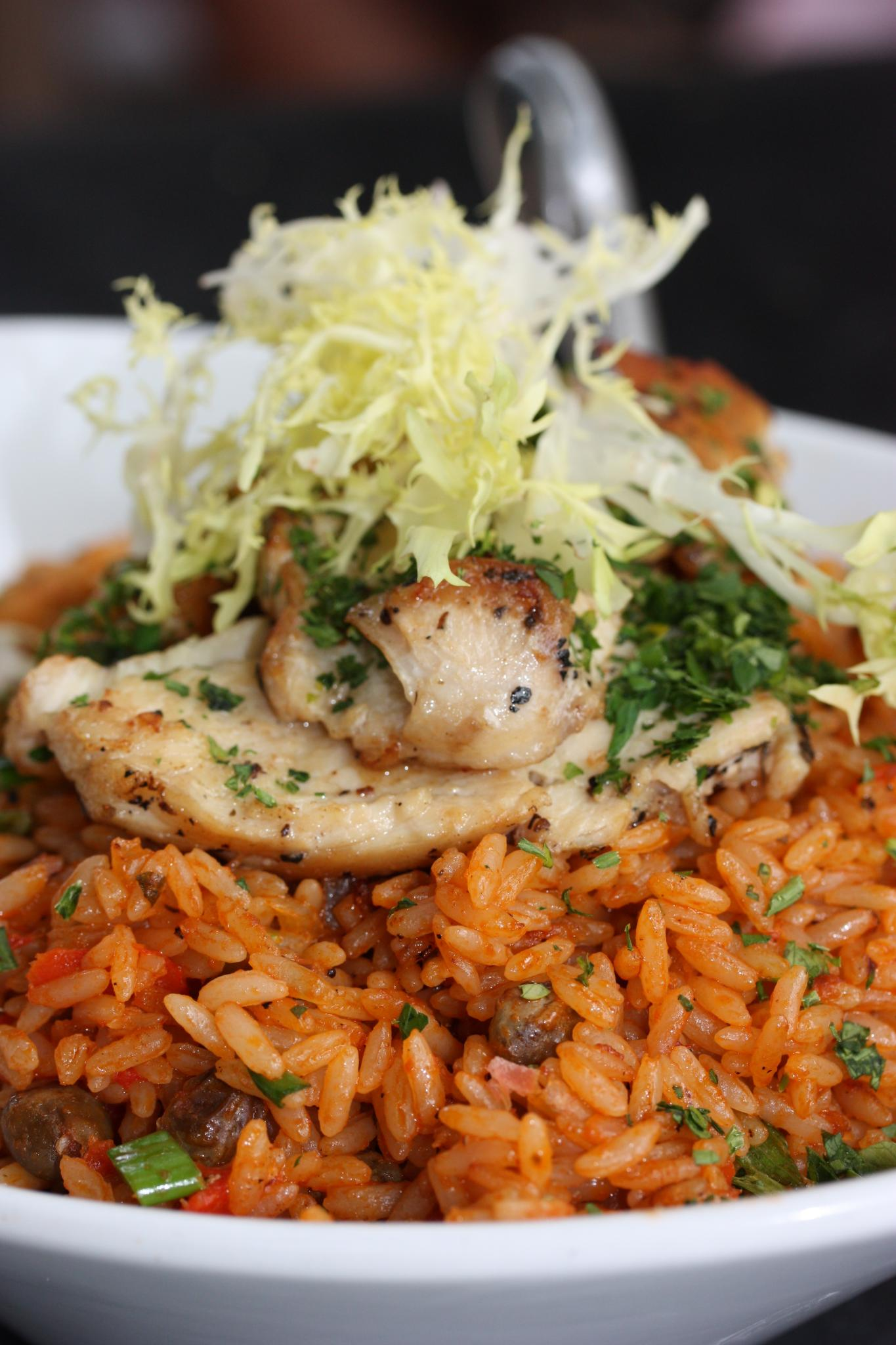
Arroz con gandules y pollo

This dish is mainly served during the Christmas season or for special occasions. The sofrito is the most important part of seasoning the rice. In Puerto Rican cooking sofrito, which is used as a base in many recipes, typically consists of the following ingredients: Recao, cilantro, yellow onions, garlic, aji dulce peppers, roasted red bell peppers, and cubanelle peppers. The sofrito is blended into a watery or paste consistency. There are many family recipe variations of sofrito. The sofrito is cooked with the rice, which absorbs it for maximum flavor.

On the day of cooking the first step is cooking the pigeon peas if they are being prepared from dried form or fresh, although the canned and frozen variety are widely available in Latino markets or supermarkets in cities where there is a significant Puerto Rican population. In a separate pot, annatto seeds are heated with an oil such as olive oil, or lard. The oil is strained and seeds are discarded. Annatto oil gives the rice a distinctive yellow/orange color.

Tocino, ham, or salchichón (salami) is added. While these cuts of pork are most traditional some cooks use pork chops, bacon, chorizo, or longaniza instead. The sofrito is also sauteed in the annatto oil to release the aromatics and cooked until most of the water has evaporated while stirring gently.

A mix of manzanilla olives, piquillo peppers, and capers fermented together called alcaparrado is added with tomato sauce and bay leaves. The sofrito along with other ingredients are cooked until most of the liquid has evaporated. Rice, pigeon peas, salt, black pepper, sazón (cumin, turmeric, M.S.G., paprika, and coriander seeds), and in some recipes orégano brujo, and avocado leaves, are then added and stirred until the rice is coated with sofrito. Broth is then poured into the pot and a can of spanish tomato sauce (consisting of pureed tomatoes, salt, cornstarch, and preservatives) is added. If the sauce is made authentically, tomatoes are blanched in boiling water for 30-60 seconds until the skin starts to split. Once cool, the skin is slipped off and discarded. The tomatoes are then pureed and cooked down in a pot with sorfito until thick.

Everything is brought to a boil, then lowered and covered with a plantain leaf and lid to simmer.

Commonly during the holiday season Puerto Rican families prepare a pork broth to make pasteles. Any remaining broth is then frozen and used afterwards. When preparing left over broth it is heated in a separate pot with smoked ham hock, water and occasionally chopped sofrito to enhance its flavor. The broth is strained over the rice, while ham hock and sofrito are discarded.

A version called arroz con gandules apastelado adds mashed green plantain or pasteles masa to the rice.

== See also ==
- Gallo Pinto—The equivalent dish in Nicaragua and Costa Rica
- Hoppin' John—The equivalent dish in the Southern United States
- List of legume dishes
- List of rice dishes
- Moro de guandules—The equivalent dish in the Dominican Republic
- Pabellón criollo—The equivalent dish in Venezuela
- Platillo Moros y Cristianos—The equivalent dish in Cuba
- Rice and beans
- Rice and peas—The equivalent dish in Jamaica
