= Calentao =

Colombian dish

Calentado
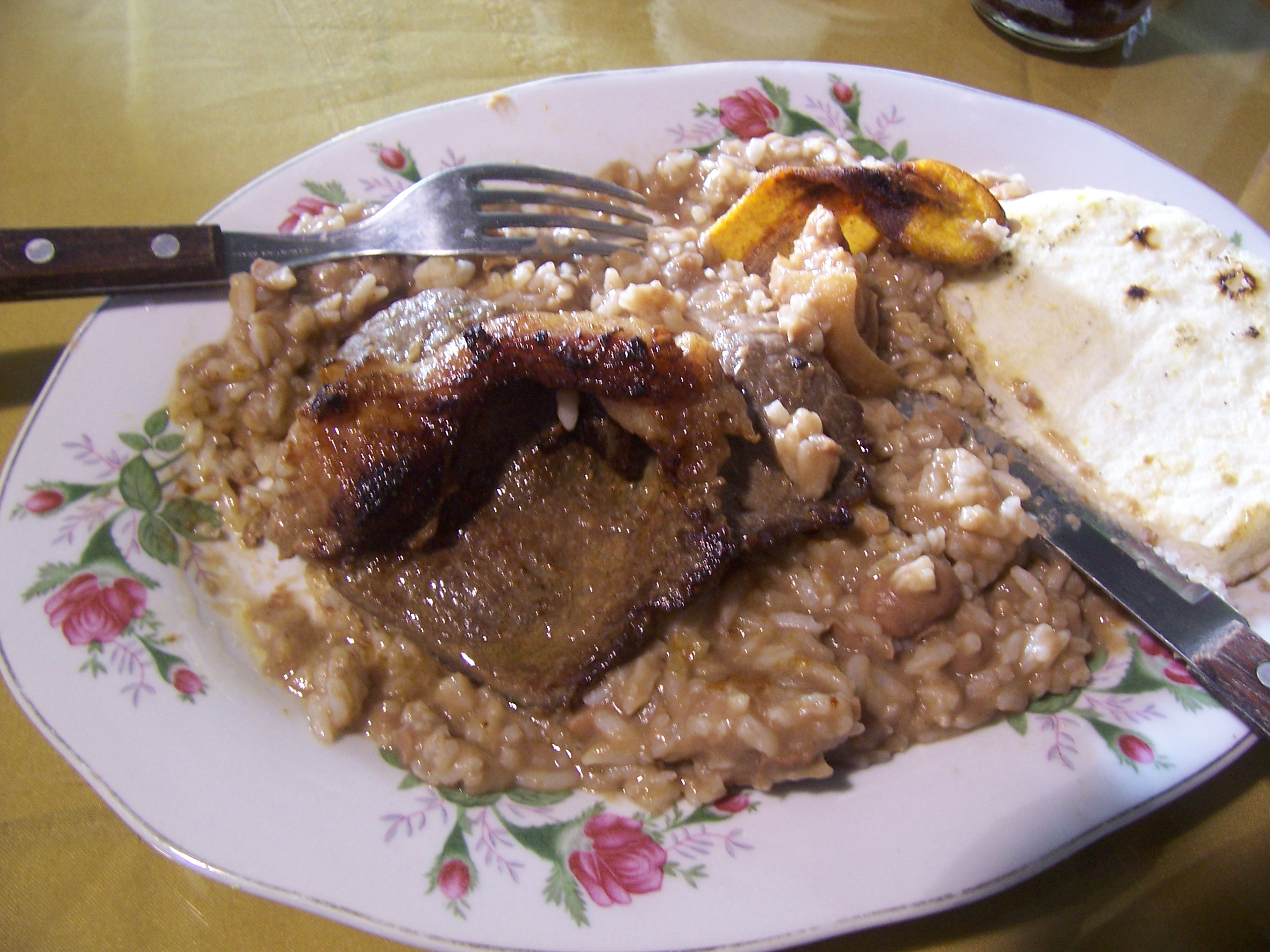
- Calentao with beef, plantain and arepa
- Alternative names: Calenta'o
- Type: Breakfast
- Associated cuisine: Colombia
- Main ingredients: Rice
- Ingredients generally used: Egg
- Variations: Calentao' "A Caballo"
- Other information: no_recipes= false

Calentao', sometimes spelled calenta'o (Colombian Spanish creole folk slang for "heated," derived from the Standard Spanish word calentado) is a Colombian cuisine dish made from reheated leftovers including rice, egg, pasta, beans, potatoes and other foods such as arepa, chorizo, and ground beef. It is generally eaten for breakfast and is often accompanied by aguapanela, arepa, coffee, juice or hot chocolate. Depending on the region it can also be served with hogao. It is sometimes referred to as Fríjoles Trasnochaos. A fried egg is usually served on top of the dish and it is called Calentao' "A Caballo" . It is usually eaten for breakfast using some of the night before's leftovers.

== See also ==
- Bandeja paisa
- Sancocho
