= Mama Don't Want No Peas an' Rice an' Cocoanut Oil =

1932 Bahamian song

Mama Don't Want No Peas an' Rice an' Cocoanut Oil is a 1932 song of Bahamian origin, first recorded by Mart Britt and his Orchestra, but most famous in the version by Count Basie. The lyrics describe a woman who is a habitual drinker. The song has become a jazz standard.

== Background and lyrics ==
The song originates from Nassau, Bahamas, where it was sung at jumping dance and fire dance ceremonies. It describes a woman, "mama", who prefers drinking brandy and rum over peas, rice, coconut oil, whiskey or gin - "because it makes her sin." She complains about "a pain in her chest, because the food papa gives her won't digest." The song was first recorded in 1932 by Mart Britt and his Orchestra.

== Count Basie ==
Count Basie and His Orchestra recorded the song for Decca Records on 6 June 1938, with lyrics provided by Louis Wolfe Gilbert and L. Charles and a vocal performance by Jimmy Rushing. This is by far the most famous version.

== Notable recorded versions ==
- Mart Britt (1932)
- Harry Roy (1934)
- Cleo Brown (1935)
- Count Basie (1938)
- Zora Neale Hurston (1939).
- Lord Lebby and the Jamaican Calypsonians (1950s)
- Burl Ives (1962)
- Hubert Porter and the Jamaican Calypsonians (1998)

== In popular culture ==
Count Basie's version of the song ia used in John Schlesinger's film The Day of the Locust (1975). It is also briefly sung by Jackie Earle Haley's character.

The song Peas and Rice by Swing Republic on their album Electro Swing Republic samples Basie's recording of this song. A version of the song was used in a TV commercial in the UK for the vegetable cooking oil Crisp n Dry, with the lyrics changed to " Mama don't want no greasy food from no cooking oil, Mama don't want no greasy food from no cooking oil, Mama likes a nice cod fish, that doesn't swim in grease, that cooks real quick with out no oil slick, Mama preaches that it's great, cos its low in saturate, she likes Crisp n Dry, my Mama likes Crisp n Dry!"
