= Cubanelle =

Sweet pepper variety

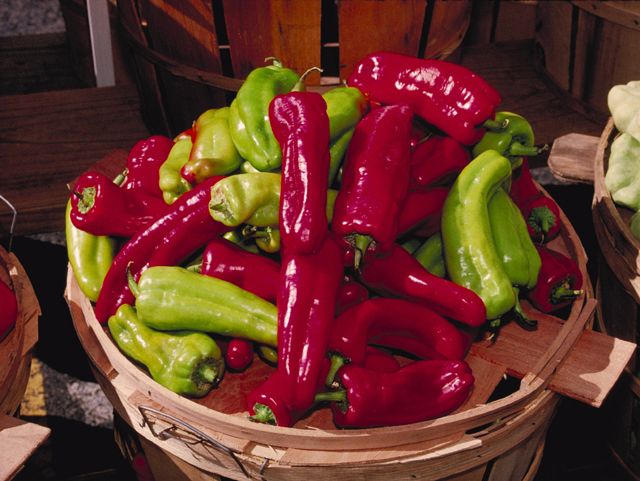
- Green and red cubanelle peppers
- Species: Capsicum annuum
- Heat: Mild
- Scoville scale: 100 – 1,000 SHU

The cubanelle, also known as the "Cuban pepper" (ají cubanela), is a varietal of mild sweet pepper from the species Capsicum annuum. When unripe, it is a light, yellowish-green color, but will turn bright red if allowed to ripen. Compared to bell peppers, it has thinner flesh, is more elongated, and has a slightly more "wrinkled" appearance.

It is used extensively in criollo cooking and the cuisines of Cuba, the Dominican Republic and Puerto Rico. In Puerto Rican recipes, ají cubanela is one of the primary ingredients of sofrito, a mild salsa- or pico de gallo-like vegetable-herb blend that forms the basis of many savory dishes, usually made up of cubanelle and bell peppers, onions, garlic, cilantro, olive oil and salt and pepper, with Sazón or other savory seasonings added.

Most cubanelle pepper imports come from the Dominican Republic, the main exporter of the cultivar.
