= Moros y Cristianos (dish) =

Cuban rice and pea dish

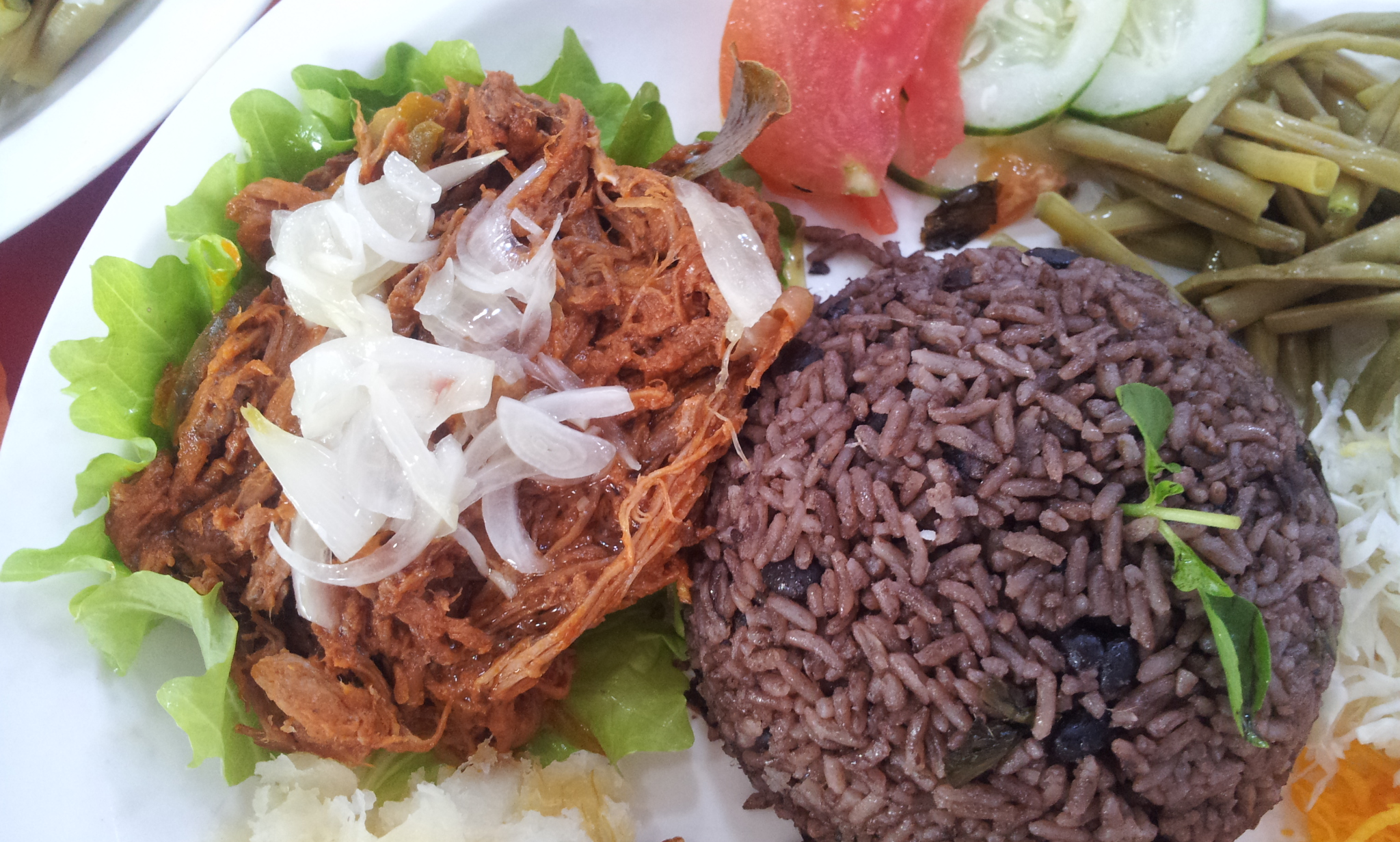
- Cuban ropa vieja served with moros y cristianos and vegetables.
- Type: Rice and peas
- Course: Side dish
- Place of origin: Cuba
- Region or state: Caribbean
- Variations: Congri

Moros y Cristianos is a Cuban dish served in homes and restaurants. It is a form of rice and peas; a dish found throughout Latin America and the Caribbean.

Moros y Cristianos means 'Moors and Christians'. Moros refers to the black beans, and Cristianos to the white rice. The name of the dish is a reference to the Arab Muslim governance of the Iberian Peninsula from the early 8th century through the Reconquista (15th century).

Onions, garlic, and red and green bell pepper are commonly used as a sofrito. To this, white rice and pre-boiled black beans are added, and the water that the beans were boiled in. Other seasonings such as cumin, tocino, Cuban oregano and bay leaf—less common ingredients include black pepper, aji dulce, sour orange juice, vinegar and tomato paste.

Moros y Cristianos are different from simple arroz con frijoles in that the beans and rice are cooked in the same pot instead of separately. Congrí is another term for the dish, but is used more commonly to refer to the similar dish with red beans that is traditionally eaten on the eastern part of the island.

== Gallery ==
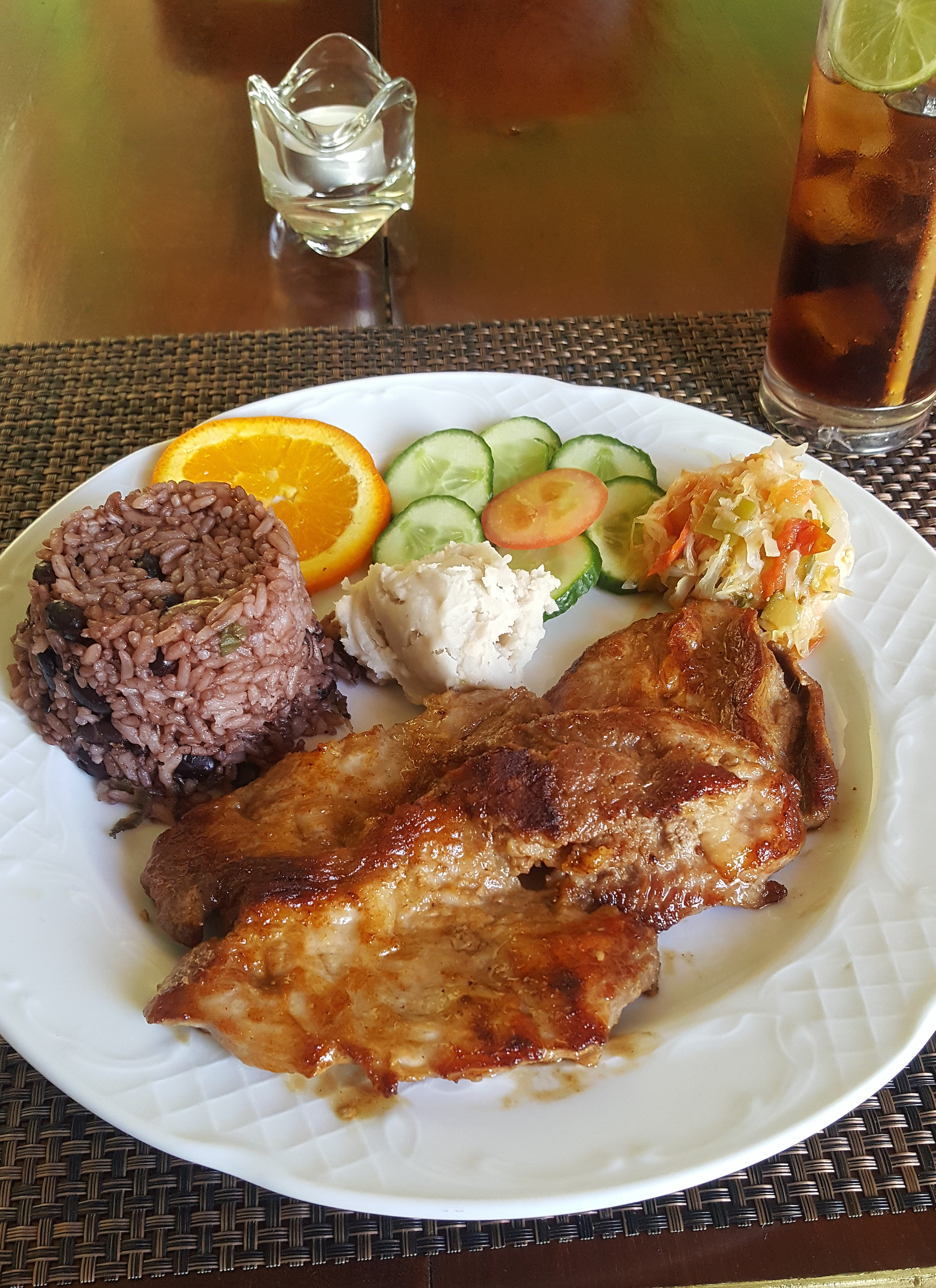
Moros y cristianos served with pork, at a restaurant in Cienfuegos, Cuba.

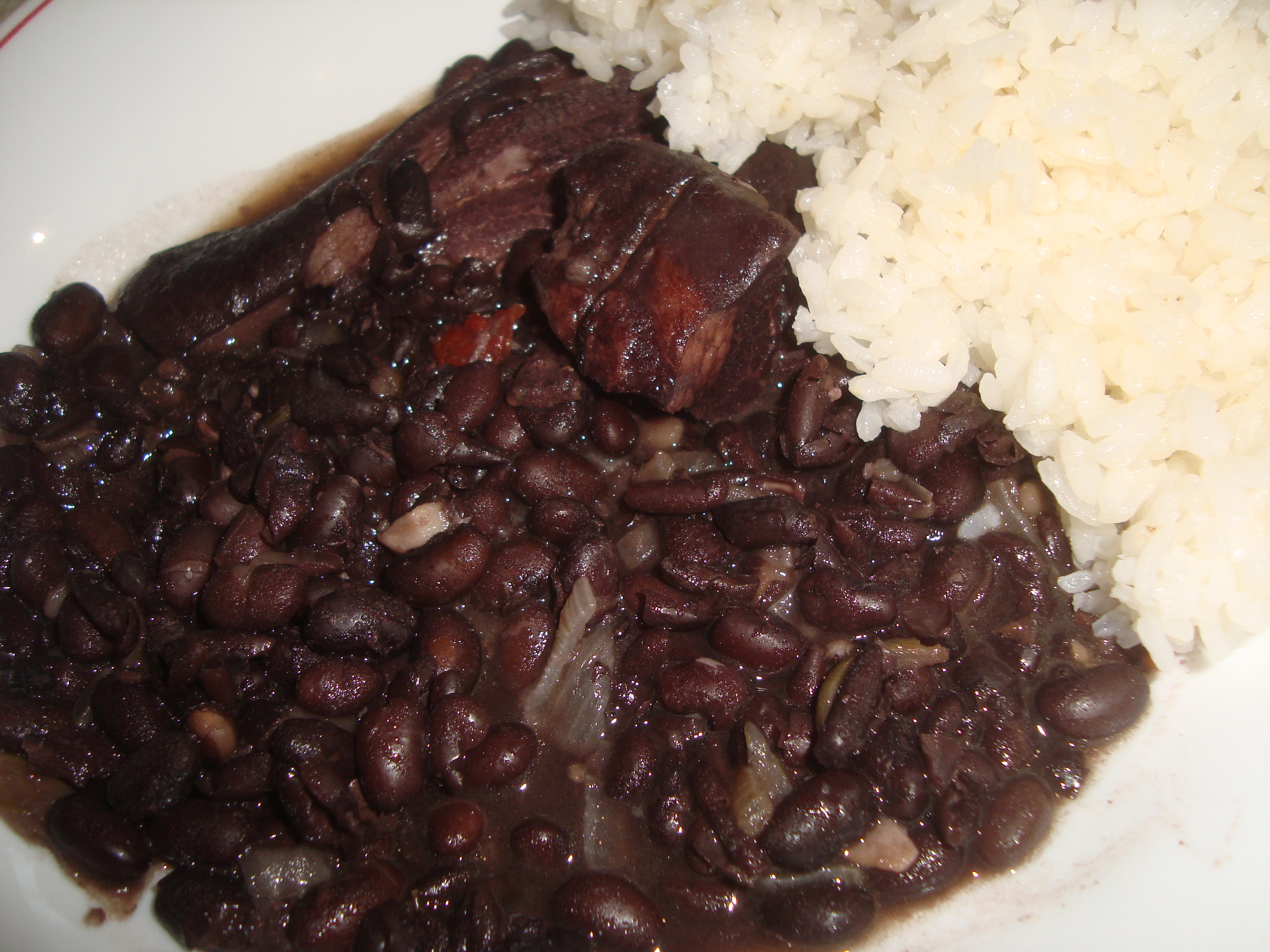
"Moros" (frijoles negros) on the left and "Cristianos" (arroz blanco) on the right

== See also ==
- Caribbean cuisine
- Cuban cuisine
- Gallo pinto
- Frijoles negros
- List of legume dishes
- Pabellón criollo
- Rice and beans
