= Arroz de fríjol cabecita negra =

Arroz fríjol cabecita negra
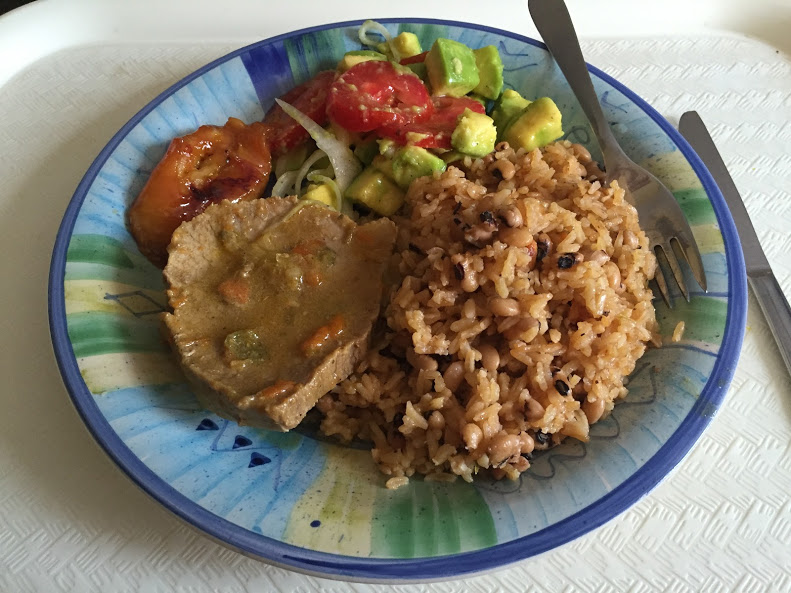
- Alternative names: Arroz con fríjolito cabecita negra
- Place of origin: Colombia
- Region or state: Atlántico; Bolívar; Córdoba; Cesar; La Guajira; Magdalena; Sucre
- Main ingredients: Black-eyed peas, rice, salt, water, vegetables
- Variations: In Córdoba a variation is prepared where coconut milk is added.

Arroz de fríjol cabecita negra is a rice-based dish from the Caribbean Coast of Colombia that utilizes black-eyed peas as the legume, differing from other rice dishes that are usually prepared with different legumes such as beans, peas, lentils, and pigeon peas.

== History ==
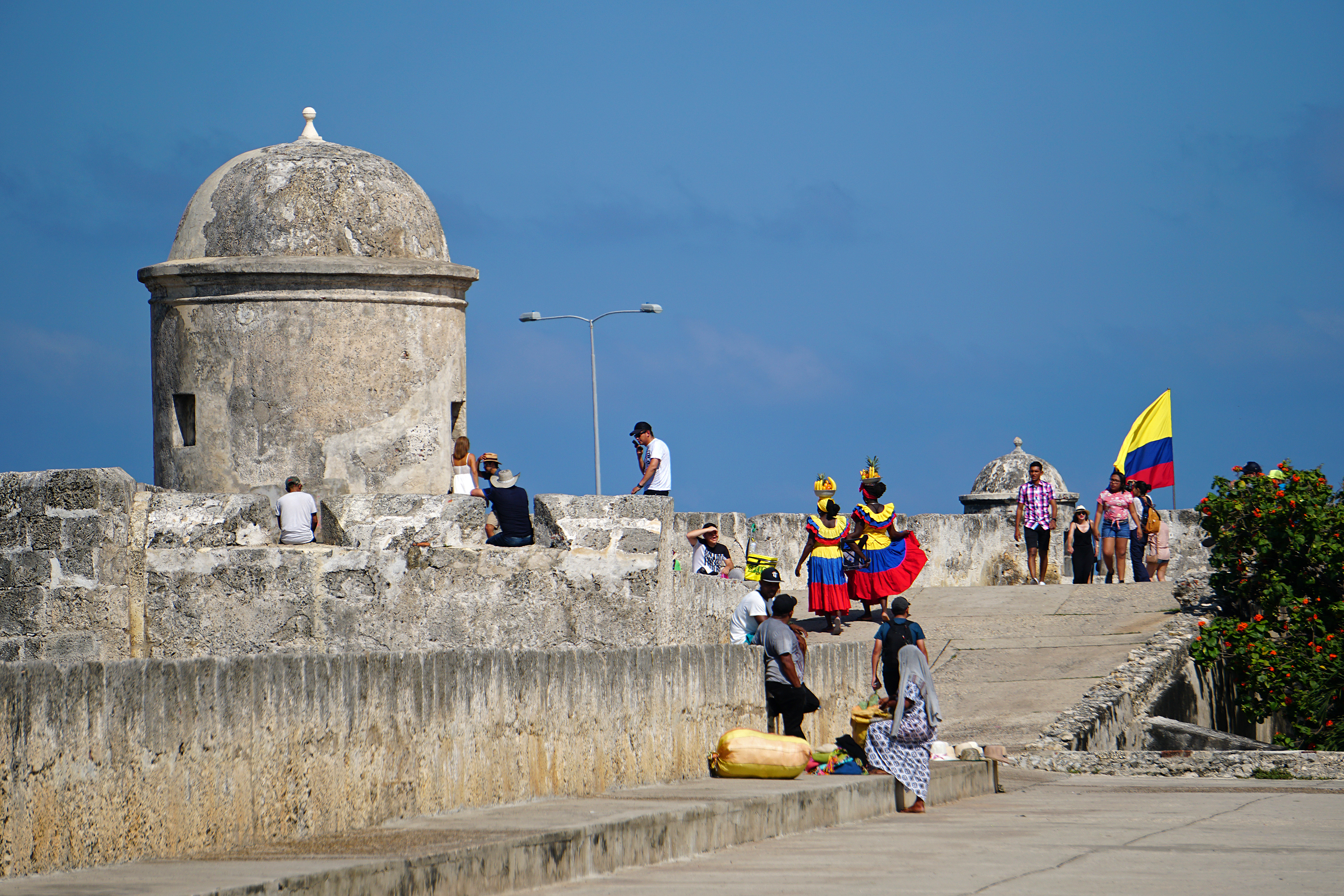
Palenquera street vendors on the castle in downtown Cartagena.

The history of the dish has been relatively undocumented and underreported. It can be found in cities like Cartagena and other regions of the Caribbean coast. It resembles the dish Hoppin' John which is found in regions of the Southern United States like Charleston; both cities share deeply rooted colonial histories and ties to the trans-atlantic slave trade. The city of Cartagena alone received more than 1.1 million enslaved Africans through its port from the beginning of the 16th century to 1852, while Charleston only received around 155,000 from the end of the 17th to the beginning of the 19th century. These enslaved Africans that arrived in Colombia would've brought knowledge of vegetables and plants they were familiar with like the main ingredients of the dish:

=== Black-eyed peas ===
The centre of diversity of the cultivation of cowpea is West Africa, leading an early consensus that this is the likely centre of origin and place of early domestication. Charred remains of cowpeas have been found in rock shelters located in Central Ghana dating to the 2nd millennium BCE. By the 17th century cowpeas began to be cultivated in the New World via the Trans-Atlantic slave trade; being used as slave food and provisions. Documentation regarding the history of Cowpeas in Colombia is null, but endemic heirloom varieties such as Kepshuna of the Wayúu people in La Guajira and various black and red varieties along with the commercial Black-eyed pea exist and are grown throughout the country.

=== Rice ===
Two species of domesticated rice exist: Oryza sativa and Oryza glaberrima. Oryza sativa is a native of East Asia and makes up the visible entirety of all rice cultivated in the world. Oryza glaberrima is a native to Sub-Saharan Africa where it is still cultivated to the present, albeit less in the present-day and varieties are also grown by groups of the African diaspora such as Carolina Gold rice by the Gullah and Arroz Quilombola in the Quilombos of Brazil. No known varieties of African rice exist in Colombia in the present-day, but the knowledge and concept around the growing and cultivation of rice led to many rice-based dishes throughout Latin America including Arroz de fríjol cabecita negra.

== Preparation ==
Beans are soaked, drained, placed into a pot, and covered with salted water, which is brought to a boil then simmer for half an hour or until tender, then drained, reserving cooking liquid. Vegetables and seasonings are sauteed, then added to the beans along with enough of the reserved cooking liquid to achieve the desired consistency.

== See also ==
- Hoppin' John
- Akara
- Baião de dois
- Waakye
- Moros y Cristianos (dish)
- Rice and peas
- Arroz con gandules
- Red beans and rice
