= Bullion (disambiguation) =

Bullion traditionally refers to gold, silver, and other precious metals in bars or ingots.

Bullion may also refer to:

- Bullion (surname)

== Places ==
In the United States

- Bullion, Missouri
- Bullion, Nevada
- Bullion Mountain, Alaska
- Mount Bullion, Alpine County, California
- Mount Bullion, Mariposa County, California

Elsewhere

- Bullion, Yvelines, France

== People ==
- Bullion (musician), British record producer

== See also ==
- Bullions, a surname
- Bouillon (disambiguation)
