= Mount Bullion, California =

Mount Bullion, California may refer to:

- Mount Bullion, Alpine County, California
- Mount Bullion, Mariposa County, California
