= Fritanga =

Restaurant serving Nicaraguan cuisine

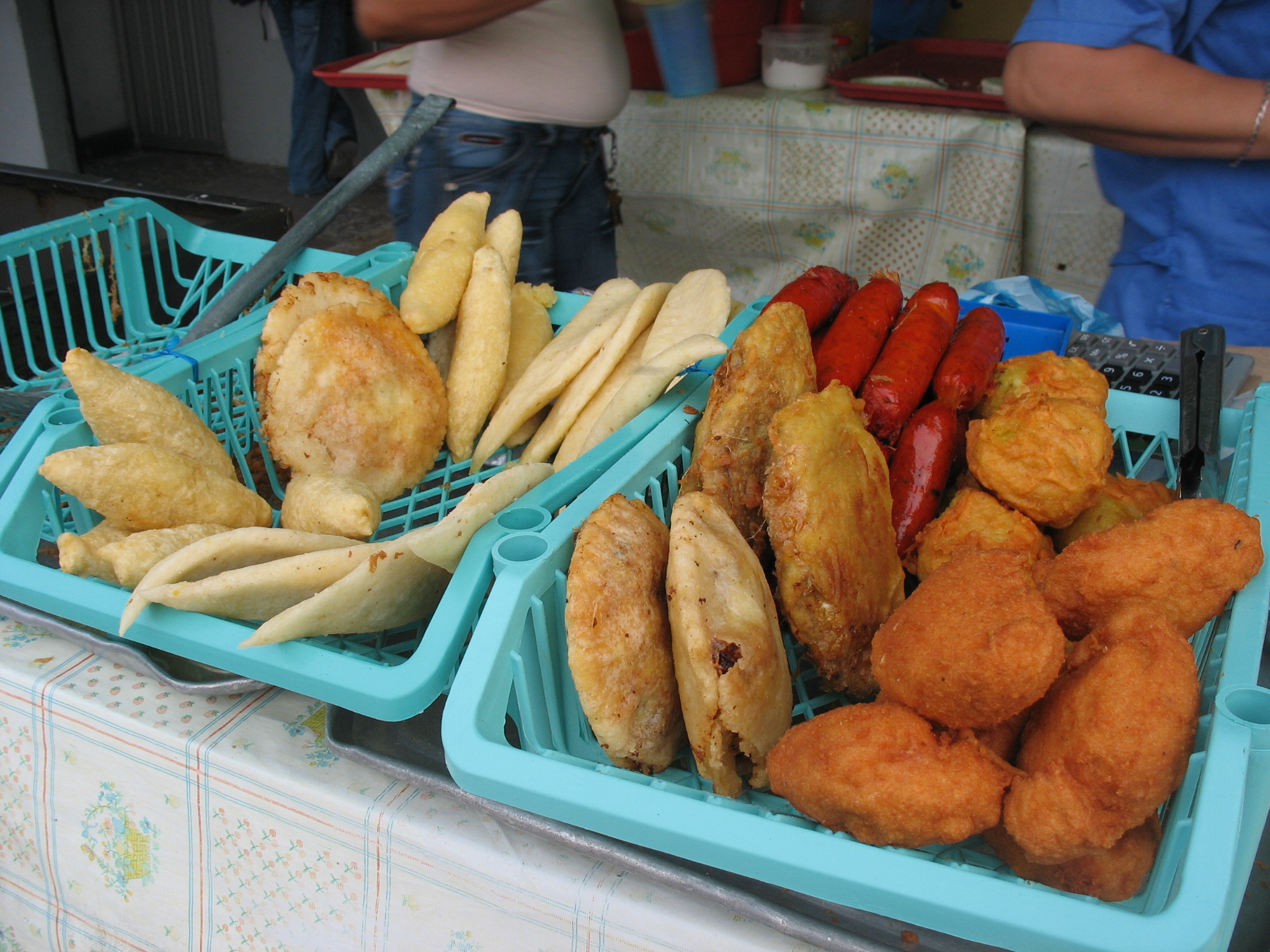
Colombian fritanga (Barranquilla-style fritanga)

In English, fritanga refers to a restaurant that makes home-style Nicaraguan foods. The staple foods at a fritanga may include gallo pinto (rice and beans), arroz blanco (white rice), carne asada (grilled meat), tajada frita (fried sliced green plantain), platano frito (fried ripe plantain), maduros (sweet plantain), yuca, queso frito (fried cheese), tortilla and cabbage salad. Fritangas also carry daily specials such as salpicón, carne desmenuzada (shredded beef), and enchiladas, as well as speciality drinks and desserts/pastries. Fritangas have a cafeteria (comideria) style of ordering and the food can be taken out or consumed at the establishment. These can be sold by local vendors across the streets or prepared by well-established restaurants.

In Spanish, fritanga does not refer to Nicaraguan restaurants, but to fried food in general, or a set of fried foods. The Colombian fritanga, for example, combines different typical components such as morcilla (blood sausage), chorizo (sausage), chicharrón (pork belly), longaniza, chunchullo, maduros (plantains), papa criolla (small yellow potatoes), and arepas. Unlike frituras or fritos (same meaning), the term fritanga can have a pejorative sense, as it is an excessively greasy food, with too much oil or unhealthy. In lore refers to establishments that use high performance frying oil, instead of virgin olive or sunflower seed oil, since it is regarded as much lower quality. Also the repeated use of the same oil, heating/cooling cycles, and the frying of different products in the same oil instead of each for one contributes to the factor. The repeated ingestion of fritanga can lead to transitory gastritis.
