= Dixie Lee pea =

Subspecies of cowpea plant

- Species: Vigna unguiculata (L.) Walp.
- Cultivar group: 'Unguiculata'
- Cultivar: Crowder type
- Marketing names: Dixielee Pea and Dixie-lee pea
- Origin: North Carolina

The Dixie Lee pea is an heirloom variety of cowpea popular in the Carolinas, although prevalent throughout most of the American south.

== History ==
=== Prelude ===
The centre of diversity of the cultivated cowpea is West Africa, leading an early consensus that this is the likely centre of origin and place of early domestication. Charred remains of cowpeas have been found in rock shelters located in Central Ghana dating to the 2nd millennium BCE. By the 17th century cowpeas began to be cultivated in the New World via the Trans-Atlantic slave trade, being used as slave food and provisions.

=== Origin ===
The origin of the word Dixie is unknown but since its first use in 1859; it has referred to someone from the South, akin to the use of Yankee in the North. Like the name implies and similar to that of the history of the Iron and Clay pea it was a popular variety in the Confederate states of America. After the Civil War Dixie Lee peas kept many southerners from starving to death, prior to which cowpeas were solely reserved as livestock feed and slave food.

== Cultivation ==
They prefer to grow in light sandy soils. They are harvested from June in North Carolina.

== Culinary use ==
They are mainly grown for their medium-sized, edible bean. The pod is green in color, slender and can be up to 7 inches long. When cooked the peas turn brown, and are very sweet. They can be used in various recipes including with ham hock and onions, or accompanying barbeque.

== See also ==
- Black-eyed pea
- Sea Island red pea
- Hoppin' John
