= Red beans and rice =

Dish characteristic of Louisiana Creole cuisine

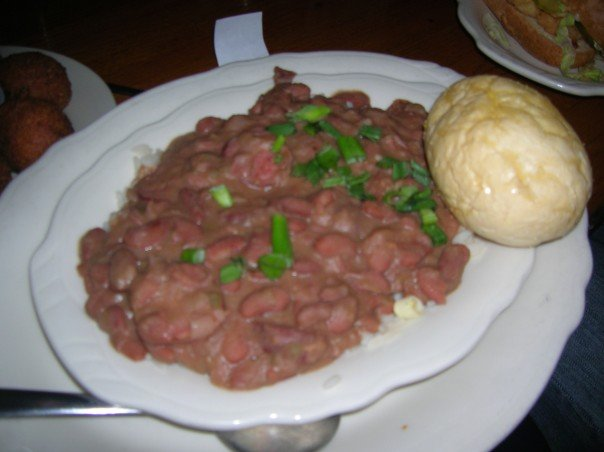
- Red beans and rice with sausage
- Place of origin: United States
- Region or state: Louisiana
- Main ingredients: Red beans; rice; onions; celery; bell pepper; pork bones; spices

Red beans and rice is an emblematic dish of Louisiana Creole cuisine (not originally of Cajun cuisine) traditionally made on Mondays with small red beans, vegetables (bell pepper, onion, and celery), spices (thyme, cayenne pepper, and bay leaf), and pork bones as left over from Sunday dinner, cooked together slowly in a pot and served over rice. Meats such as ham, sausage (most commonly andouille), and tasso ham are also frequently used in the dish. The dish is customary – ham was traditionally a Sunday meal and Monday was washday. A pot of beans could sit on the stove and simmer while the women were busy scrubbing clothes. The dish is a form of rice and beans, and is now fairly common throughout the Southeast. Similar dishes are cooked throughout Central America, parts of South America, and the Caribbean, and are dietary staples. Examples are gallo pinto, moros y cristianos, feijoada, casamiento, and arroz con habichuelas. A similar vegetarian dish rajma chawal (which translates literally to red beans and rice) is popular in North India.

Red beans and rice is one of the few New Orleans-style dishes to be commonly served both in people's homes and in restaurants. Many neighborhood restaurants and even schools continue to serve it as a Monday lunch or dinner special, usually with a side order of cornbread and either smoked sausage or a pork chop. While Monday washdays are largely historical, red beans remain a staple for large gatherings such as Super Bowl and Mardi Gras parties. New Orleanian musician Louis Armstrong's favorite food was red beans and rice, and he would sign letters "Red Beans and Ricely Yours, Louis Armstrong".

== See also ==
- Cuisine of New Orleans
- Gallo pinto
- Hoppin' John
- Rajma
- List of legume dishes
- List of regional dishes of the United States
- List of rice dishes
- List of sausage dishes
