= Hoppin' John =

Southern peas and rice dish

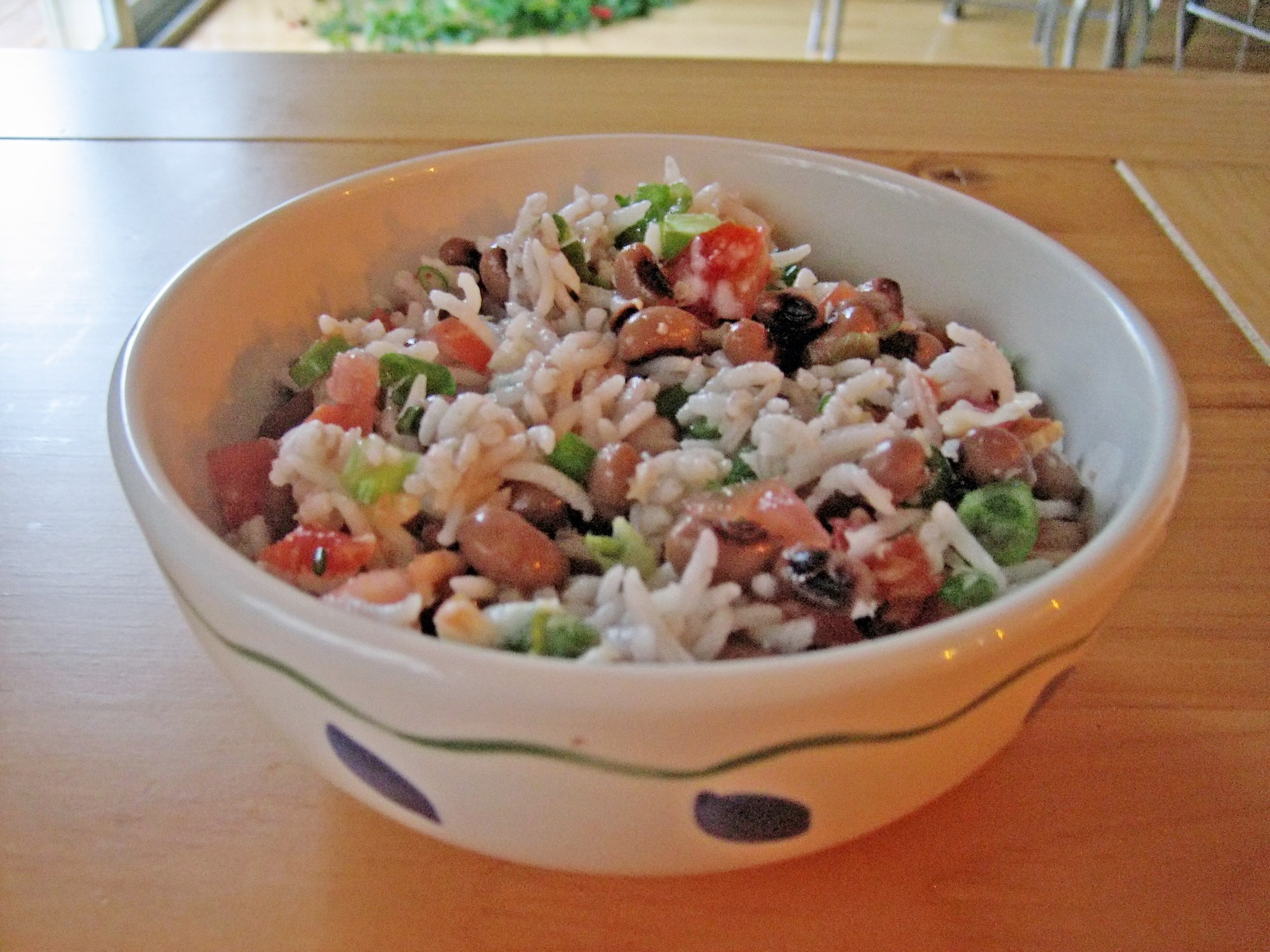
- Alternative names: Carolina peas and rice
- Course: Meal
- Place of origin: Southern United States
- Region or state: South Carolina
- Main ingredients: Black-eyed peas and rice, chopped onion, sliced bacon
- Variations: substitute ham hock, fatback, or country sausage for the conventional bacon, or smoked turkey parts as a pork alternative.

Hoppin' John, also known as Carolina peas and rice, is a rice and beans dish of legendary origins associated with the cuisine of the Southern United States. Similar dishes are found in regions with a significant African-origin demographic like Louisiana red beans and rice. The Carolina version is known for the addition of bacon and other kinds of pork.

The starchy long-grain Carolina rice that is used in this meal must be washed well and cooked in bacon fat with onions until the grains are translucent before it is simmered with the parboiled black-eyed peas or Sea Island red peas and some chopped ham, ham hock or pork sausage. To finish the one-pot meal, the rice, having absorbed all the cooking liquid, is left to steam using the paper towel method for around 10 minutes and it is fluffed before serving. Some recipes use ham hock, fatback, country sausage, or smoked turkey parts instead of bacon. A few use green peppers or vinegar and spices. Smaller than black-eyed peas, field peas are used in the South Carolina Lowcountry and coastal Georgia. Black-eyed peas are the norm elsewhere.

In the southern United States, eating Hoppin' John with collard greens on New Year's Day is thought to bring a prosperous year filled with luck. The peas are symbolic of pennies or coins, and a coin is sometimes added to the pot or left under the dinner bowls. Collard greens, mustard greens, turnip greens, chard, kale, cabbage and similar leafy green vegetables served along with this dish are supposed to further add to the wealth, since they are the color of American currency.

Another traditional food, cornbread, can also be served to represent wealth, being the color of gold. On the day after New Year's Day, leftover "Hoppin' John" is called "Skippin' Jenny" and further demonstrates one's frugality, bringing a hope for an even better chance of prosperity in the New Year.

== Etymology ==
=== Early print references ===
The Oxford English Dictionary's first reference to the dish is from Frederick Law Olmsted's 19th century travelogue, A Journey in the Seaboard Slave States (1861). A recipe for "Hopping John" in The Carolina Housewife by Sarah Rutledge, which was published in 1847, is also cited as the earliest reference. An even earlier source is Recollections of a Southern Matron, which mentions "Hopping John", defined, in a note, as "bacon and rice", as early as 1838.

=== Lexical source ===
The origins of the name are uncertain. One possibility is that the name is a corruption of the Haitian Creole term for black-eyed peas: pwa pijon (pronounced [pwapiʒɔ̃]) lit. 'pigeon peas' meaning black-eyed peas. Pwa pijon is a borrowing from the French pois pigeon.

== History ==
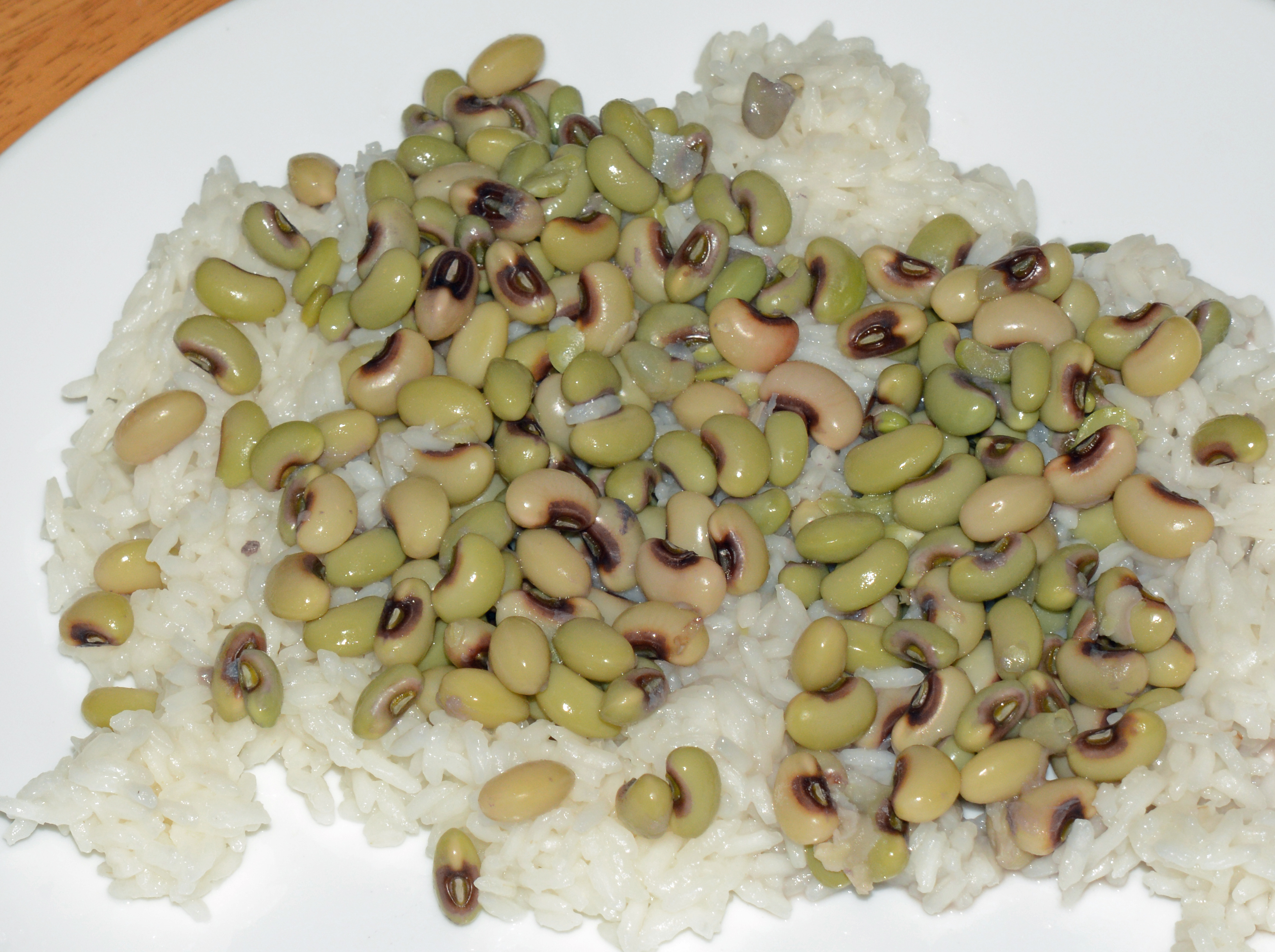
Hoppin' John - black-eyed peas and rice

Hoppin' John originated from the Gullah people and was originally a Lowcountry one-pot dish before spreading to the entire population of the South. Hoppin' John may have evolved from rice and bean mixtures that were the subsistence of enslaved West Africans en route to the Americas. Hoppin' John has been further traced to similar foods in West Africa, in particular the Senegalese dish thiebou niebe. It is also similar to waakye, a rice and beans dish from Ghana.

One tradition common in the United States is that each person at the meal should leave three peas on their plate to ensure that the New Year will be filled with luck, fortune and romance. Another tradition holds that counting the number of peas in a serving predicts the amount of luck, or wealth, that the diner will have in the coming year. On Sapelo Island in the community of Hog Hammock, Geechee red peas are used instead of black-eyed peas. Sea Island red peas are similar.

American chef Sean Brock claims that traditional Hoppin' John was made with Carolina Gold rice, once thought to be extinct, and Sea Island red peas. He has worked with farmers to reintroduce this variety of rice. As of 2017, several rice growers offer Carolina Gold rice.

== Variants ==
Other bean and rice dishes are seen in Southern Louisiana and in the Caribbean, and are often associated with African culinary influence in the Americas. The Louisiana Creole version is called congri, and other regional variants include the Guyanese dish "cook-up rice", which uses black-eyed peas and coconut milk; "Hoppin' Juan," which substitutes Cuban black beans for black-eyed peas; the Peruvian tacu-tacu; and the Brazilian dish baião de dois, which often uses black-eyed peas.

== See also ==
- Arroz de fríjol cabecita negra - the Colombian equivalent.
- Arroz con gandules - the Puerto Rican equivalent
- Gallo pinto - the equivalent dish of Nicaragua and Costa Rica
- Pabellón criollo - A similar dish in Venezuela including shredded beef and where ingredients are served separately
- Platillo Moros y Cristianos - the Cuban equivalent
- Saint Sylvester's Day - a similar dish is eaten in Italy to celebrate the New Year.
- List of regional dishes of the United States
