= Sea Island red pea =

Subspecies of cowpea plant

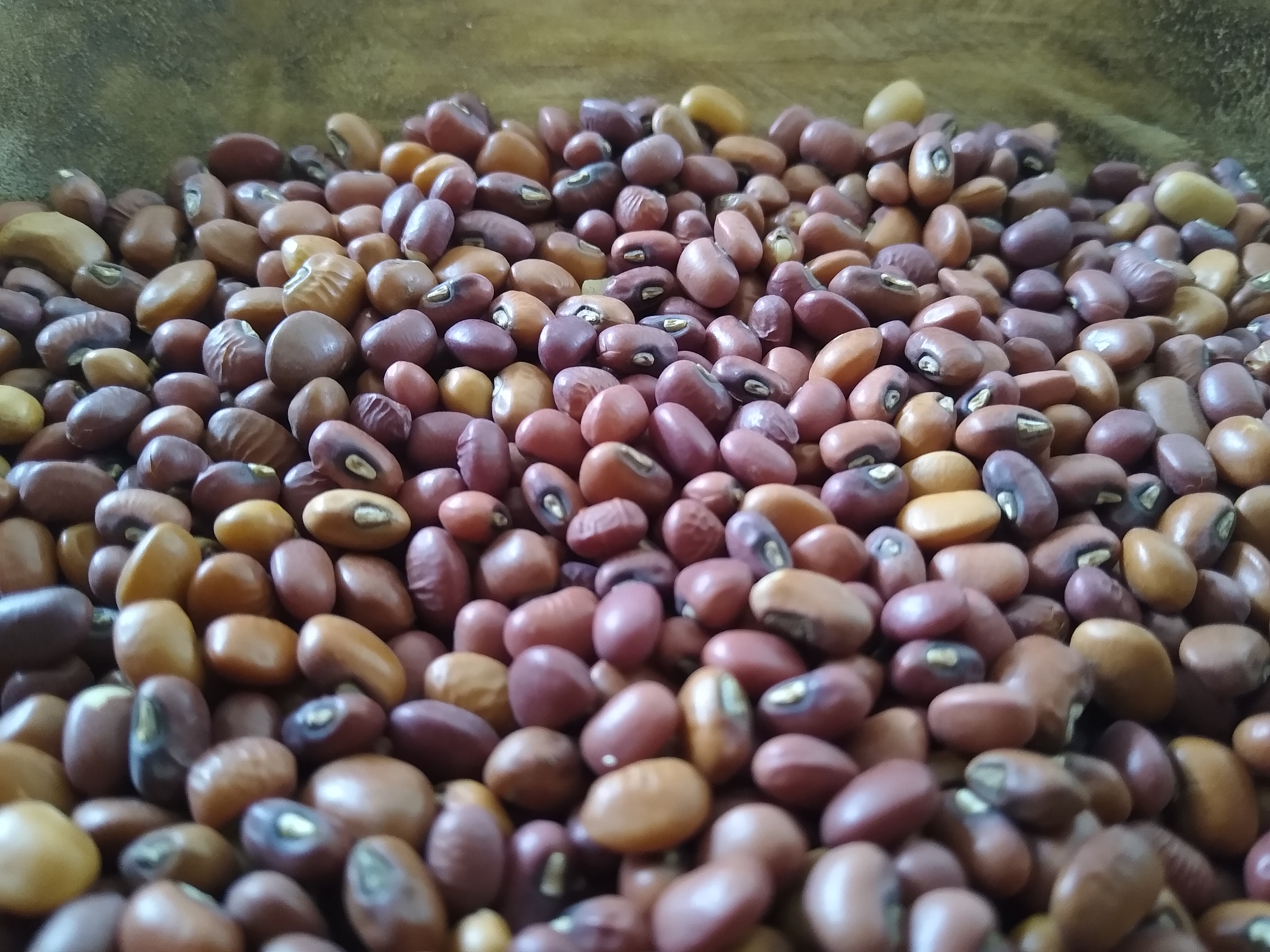
- Diversity among Sea Island red pea phenotypes displayed.
- Species: Vigna unguiculata (L.) Walp.
- Cultivar group: 'Unguiculata'
- Cultivar: Sea Island red pea
- Marketing names: Sapelo island red peas, Sapelo red pea and Geechee red peas
- Origin: Sapelo Island and the Sea Islands

Sea Island red pea is an heirloom landrace of cowpea from the Gullah corridor of the Sea Islands. They are an integral part of Gullah cuisine and have been listed on the Ark of Taste.

== History ==
=== Prelude ===
The centre of diversity of the cultivated cowpea is West Africa, leading an early consensus that this is the likely centre of origin and place of early domestication. Charred remains of cowpeas have been found in rock shelters located in Central Ghana dating to the 2nd millennium BCE. By the 17th century cowpeas began to be cultivated in the New World via the Trans-Atlantic slave trade; being used as slave food and provisions.

=== Origins ===
Sea Island red peas came to the Sea Islands from the Mende of modern Sierra Leone, where from 1750 to 1775, 50,000 enslaved Sub-Saharan Africans, predecessors to the Gullah, were kidnapped. They were mainly abducted from "Rice Coast", between modern Guinea and Guinea-Bissau, Ivory Coast, Sierra Leone and Liberia, due to their expertise and experience in the cultivation of Carolina gold rice.

=== Modernity ===
Due to lack of social upward mobility many Gullah have left their traditional life in search of better opportunities. This has led to the loss of many speakers of the Gullah language, and along with years of Gullah being displaced and forcefully extracted from their cultural homeland due to massive resorts and golf courses being constructed, the Sea Island red pea has been viewed as a tool that can be used to preserve their culture into modernity.

== Cultivation ==
The Sea Island red pea, as a landrace, tends to have variations in its coloration and size of its seed coat.

They should be sown prior to frost, roughly late May and mid-July and climb resulting in the use of a trellis, domestically. They should be sown about 1in deep spacing roughly 4in apart. They tolerate bad soil and replenish nitrogen in the soil. To mitigate chances of cross-pollination they should be separated by at least 20 ft from other cowpea varieties. Viable seeds should be saved when the pods are dry and crisp.

== Culinary use ==
They may be used in a similar manner to the cowpea or black-eyed pea to make hoppin' John, akara, acarajé, or waakye. American chef Sean Brock claims that traditionally, hoppin' John would have been made with Carolina Gold rice and Sea Island red peas. He has worked with farmers to re-introduce these varieties to the market place.

Traditionally, Gullah would prepare the peas by adding them to perloo or by making red peas and rice.

== See also ==
- Gullah people
- Gullah language
- Sea Island cotton
- Black-eyed pea
- Dixie Lee pea
