= Imoro Muniratu =

Ghanaian food vendor (1951/1952–2024)

- Aunti Munie
- Born: Imoro Muniratu; 1950s
- Died: 3 January 2024; University of Ghana Medical Centre
- Known for: her cooking (Waakye)

Auntie Muni (born Imoro Muniratu, 1951/1952 – 3 January 2024) was a Ghanaian food vendor renowned for her waakye, a popular Ghanaian dish consisting of rice and beans. She operated her stall in Accra, Ghana, for over 35 years, becoming a beloved figure and garnering national recognition for her culinary expertise and warm personality. The queues at her stall in Accra were well known. She died in hospital after a short illness.

== QR payments at Auntie Muni ==
On 19 November 2020, Ghana's vice president, Mahamudu Bawumia launched Ghana's Universal Quick Response Code (QR Code) system at Auntie Muni's Joint.

== Personal life and death ==
Muniratu hailed from the city of Tamale, in the Northern Region of Ghana. She was a Muslim. Muniratu died on 3 January 2024, at the age of 72. Muniratu was buried on Sunday 21 January 2025 after the final Islamic prayers at the Cantonment Police Mosque.
