= Bullions =

Bullions is a surname. Notable people with the surname include:

- Jim Bullions (1924–2014), Scottish footballer
- Peter Bullions (1791–1864), Scottish-born American minister and grammarian

== See also ==
- Bullion (disambiguation)
