= Orez Shu'it =

Israeli bean and tomato dish

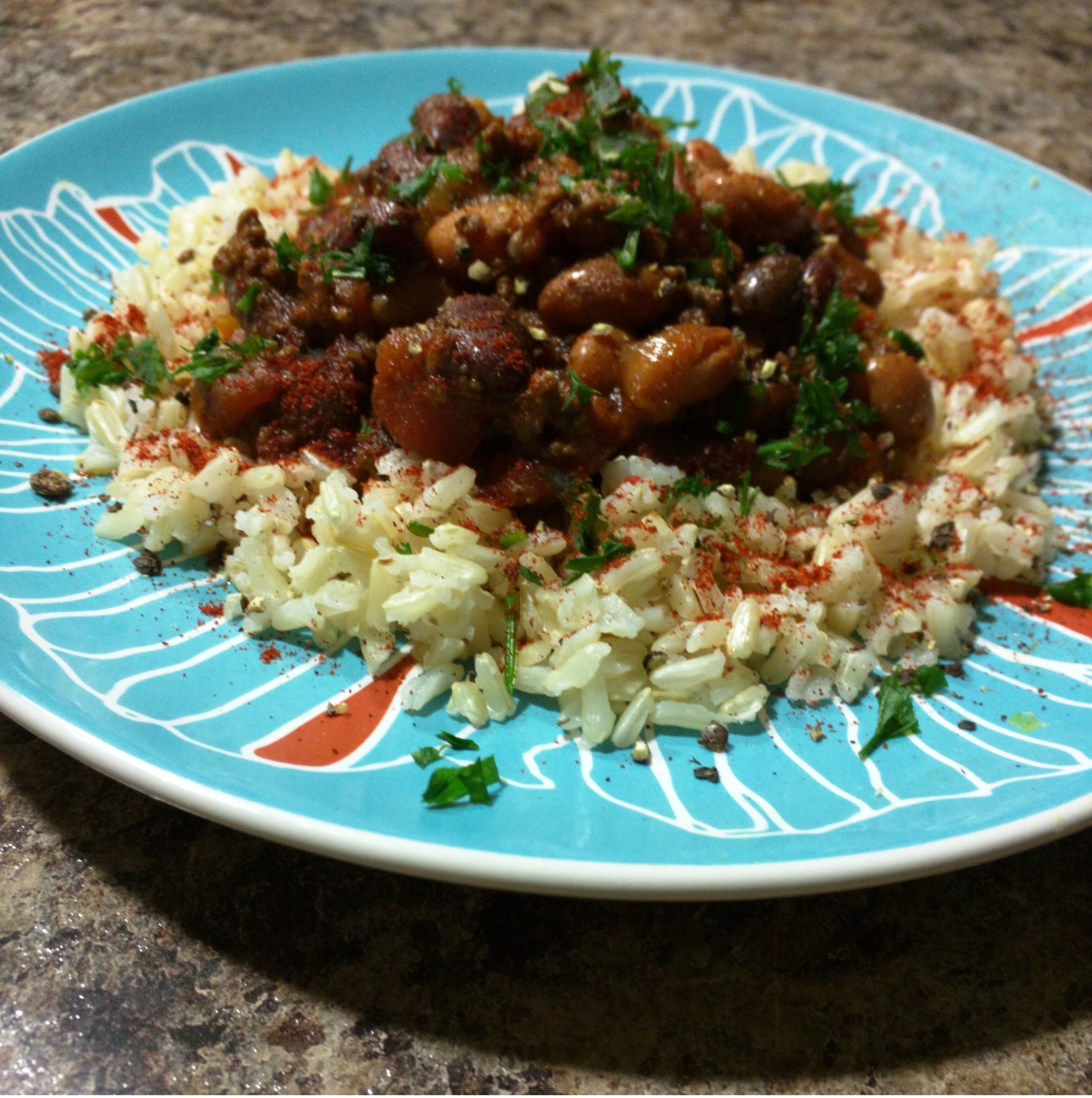
- Orez Shu'it (Hebrew: אורז שעועית)
- Type: Side dish
- Place of origin: Israel
- Region or state: Jerusalem
- Serving temperature: Hot
- Main ingredients: Rice and beans, tomato paste
- Variations: Served with lamb or beef cubes

Orez Shu'it (Hebrew: אורז שעועית) (Ladino: Avas kon arroz or Avikas kon arroz) is an Israeli dish consisting of white beans cooked in a tomato paste, served on white rice. The dish was developed by Sephardic Jews in the old city of Jerusalem and was later adopted by other Jewish groups. It is today served in homes and restaurants as a side dish and is considered part of the regional cuisine of Jerusalem. Modern variations include adding meat (beef, lamb, chicken) and fried onions.

== See also ==
- Rice and beans
- Israeli cuisine
- Cuisine of the Sephardic Jews
