= Rice and beans =

Type of dish made from a combination of staple foods

Beans and rice
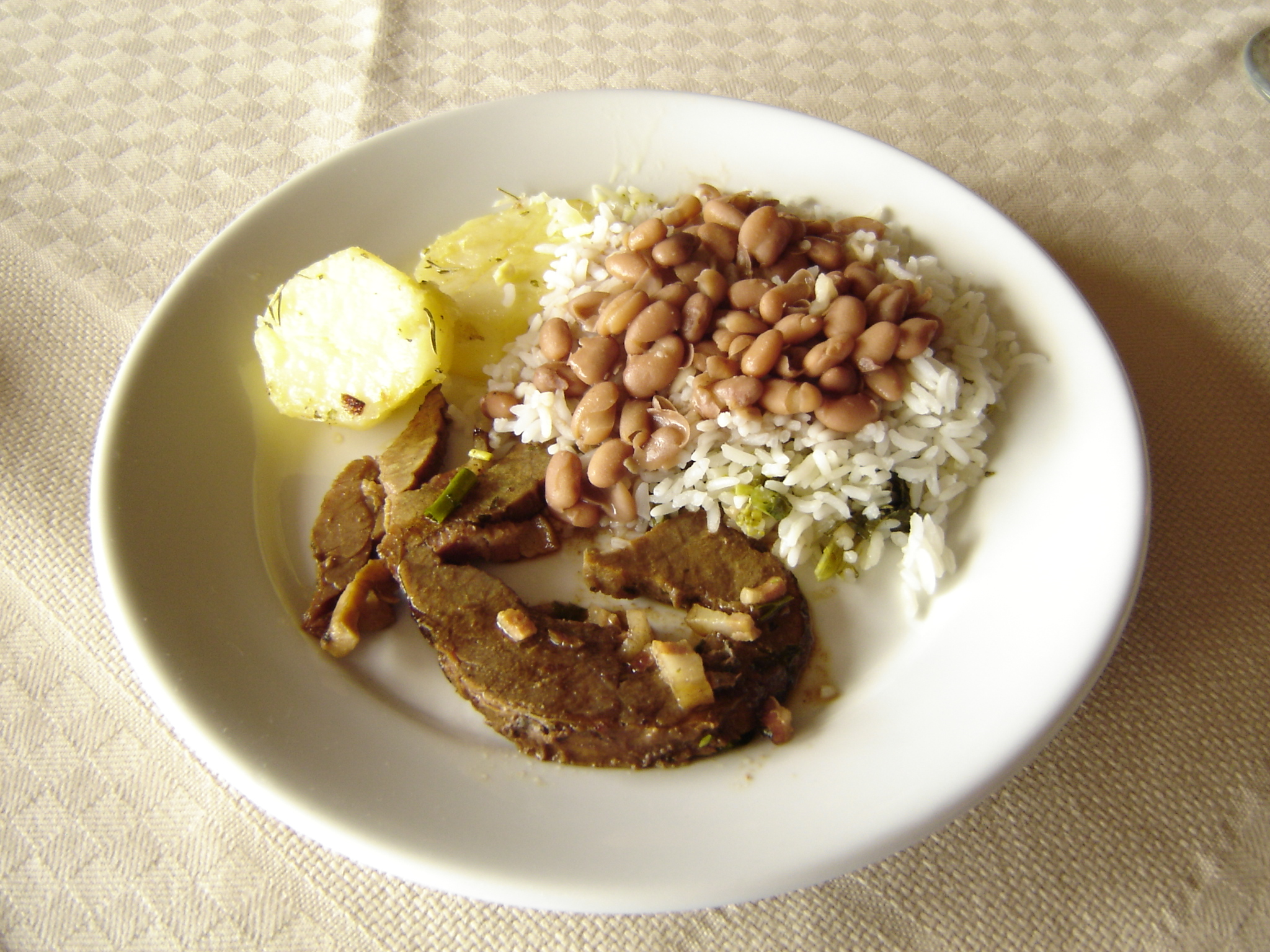
- White rice topped with brown beans served with meat and potatoes in a hotel in the southeast Brazilian countryside
- Course: Breakfast, lunch, dinner
- Region or state: Worldwide
- Main ingredients: Rice, beans
- Variations: Regional variations

Rice and beans, or beans and rice, is a category of dishes from many cultures around the world where the staple foods of rice and beans are combined in some manner. The grain and legume combination provides several important nutrients and many calories, and both foods are widely available. The beans are usually seasoned, while the rice may be plain or seasoned. If the beans do not top the rice, the two components may be mixed together, separated on the plate, or served separately.

== Description ==
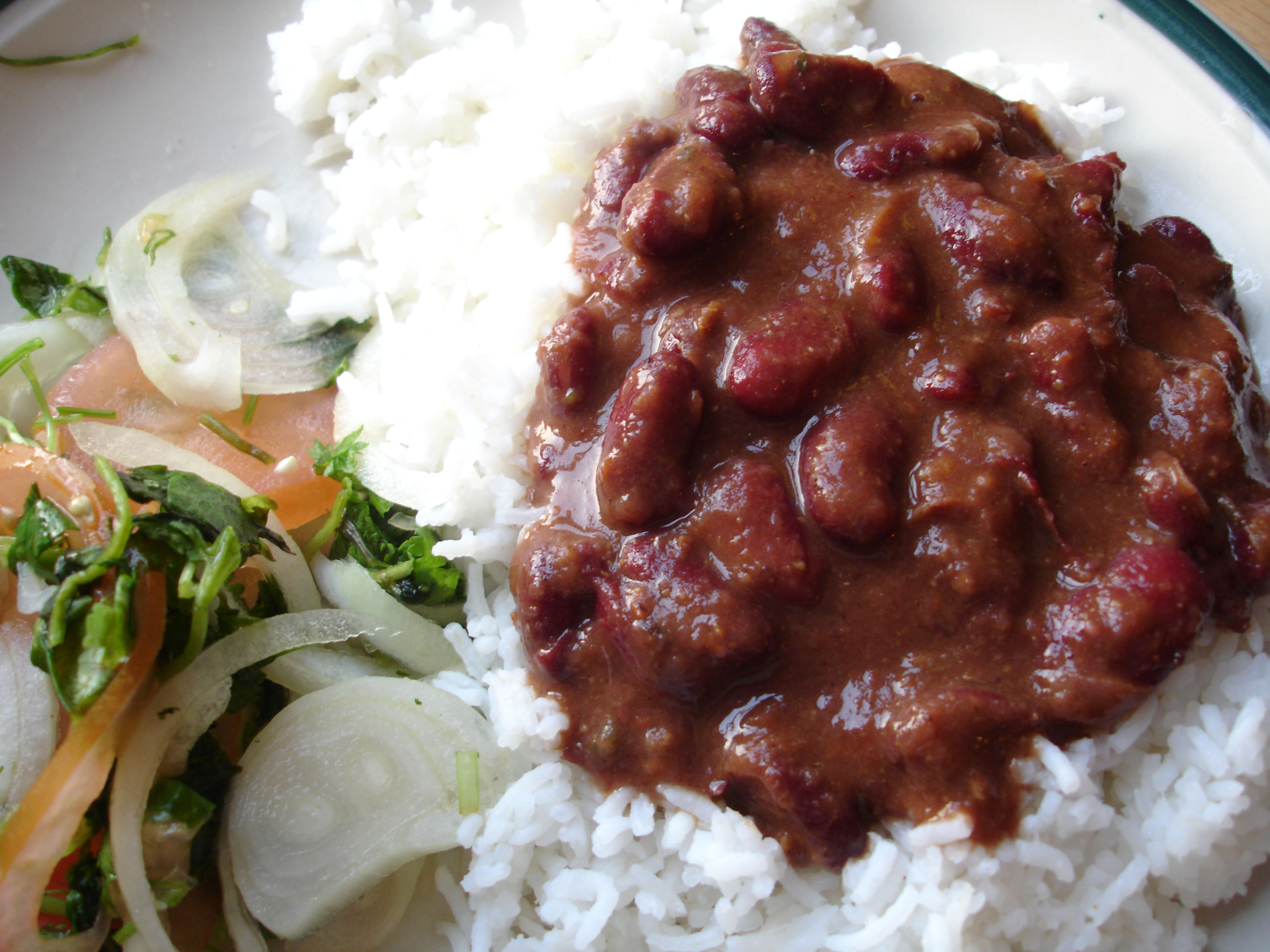
Kidney beans and rice

The dish usually consists of white or brown rice accompanied by cooked brown, red or black dry beans (typically Phaseolus vulgaris or Vigna unguiculata) and seasoned in various ways. This dish is also commonly served with sides of stewed chicken, pork, beef, potato salad, boiled potatoes, and many other sides from many different cultures. In many areas, beans and rice are often served side by side rather than combined. In either case, they may be considered a meal, frequently with a topping of meat. Meat or other ingredients are sometimes placed atop beans and rice or, less frequently, mixed into it.

Different regions have different preferences for the constituents of the dish. In Nicaragua, for example, red beans are more popular while cooking gallo pinto, while in Costa Rica black beans are used instead. In Brazil, black beans are more popular in Paraná, Rio de Janeiro, Rio Grande do Sul, and Santa Catarina, while in other parts of the country these are mostly only used in feijoadas. The New Orleans specialty known as "red beans and rice" is often accompanied by a side of smoked sausage or a fried pork chop.

== History ==
Genetic analyses of the common bean Phaseolus indicate that it originated in Mesoamerica and subsequently spread southward along with maize and squash, traditional companion crops. Asian rice was introduced to Latin America during the colonial era by the Spanish and the Portuguese. However, it has recently been discovered that the indigenous peoples of the Amazon had already cultivated a distant relative of Asian rice of the same genus Oryza some 4,000 years ago and were growing it alongside maize and squash, which were also by that time present in South America. Recent scholarship suggests that enslaved Africans may also have played an active role in the establishment of rice in the New World. It is also one of the most common foods in some Spanish-speaking countries.

== Nutritional significance ==
Beans and rice are both nutritious ingredients. Rice is rich in starch, making it a good source of energy, and also contains iron and some protein. Beans also contain iron and a greater amount of protein in comparison to rice. Together they make up a complete protein, which provides large quantities of each of the amino acids the body cannot produce by itself. Their amino acid profiles complement each other when combined, meaning that such dishes are acknowledged as beneficial protein in vegetarian terms.

== Culture ==
In some Latin American states and countries, beans and rice are commonly eaten as an everyday lunch, along with a different variety of meats and vegetables. It is also common to prepare dinner using leftovers from lunch. Beans and rice are especially popular in Brazil, which is the world's third largest producer of dry beans and the largest consumer of rice in the Americas.

== International dishes and variations ==
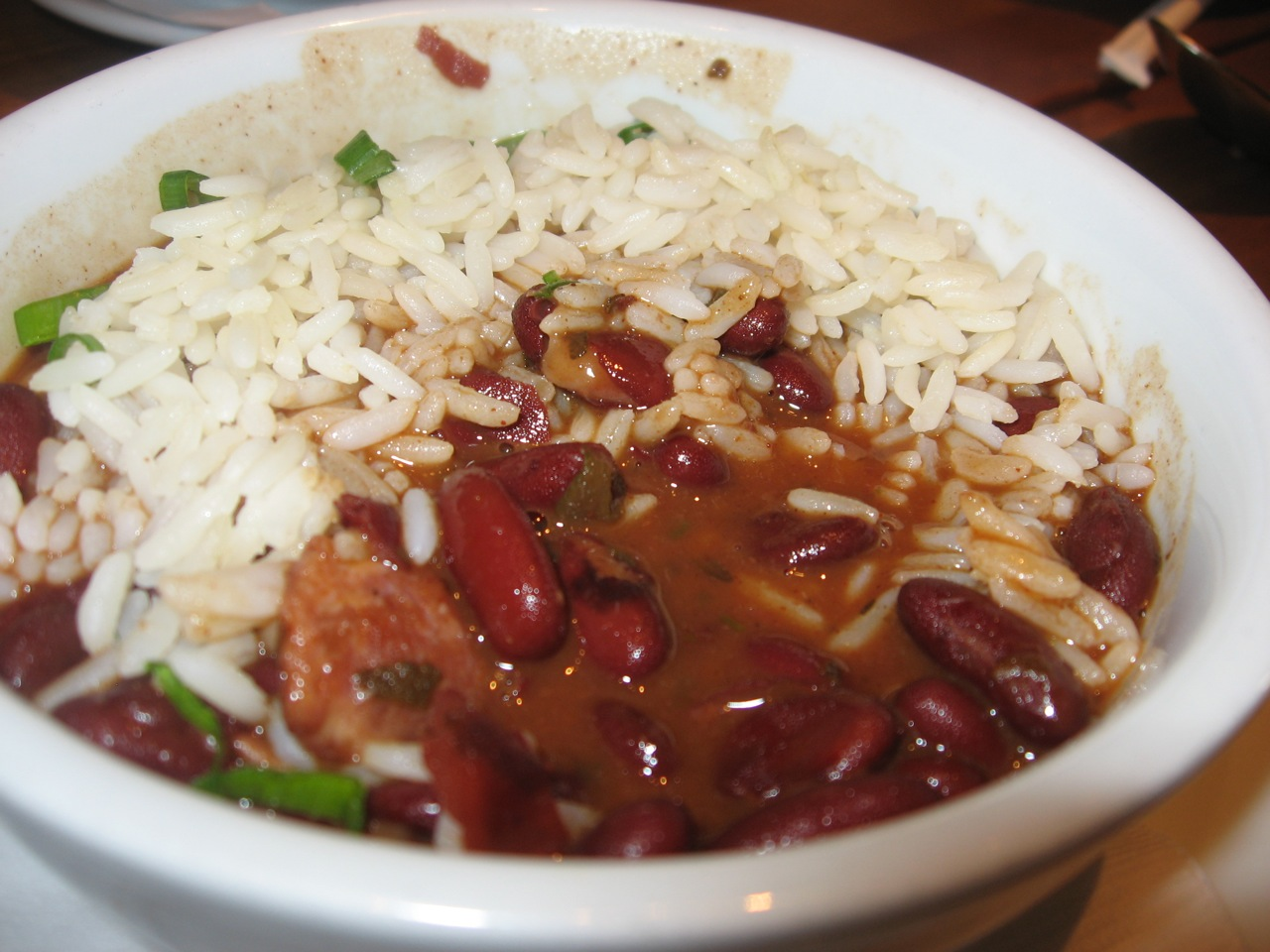
Red beans and rice

Worldwide, there are many dishes based on beans and rice which vary in their cooking method and additional ingredients. Variations exist regionally as cultures shape the dishes to their own preferences. The following is a list of regional variations:

- Brazil: Arroz com feijão or feijoada, a traditional dish made with black beans and pork, served with rice.
- Chile: Arroz con porotos
- Caribbean: Rice and peas
- China: Hóngdòu fàn, laba congee
- Colombia: Calentao
  - Bandeja paisa, a traditional dish made with kidney beans and rice (from Archipelago of San Andrés, Providencia and Santa Catalina).
- Costa Rica: Gallo pinto is Costa Rica's national dish, typically served for breakfast with eggs. The most common preparation is with leftover rice, black beans, bell peppers, onions, and cilantro. Regional varieties exist in both Guanacaste and Limón.
- Cuba: There are two main variations:
  - Moros y cristianos: also known as just moros, it is made with black beans. If made with red beans, it would be considered congris.
  - Congris: made with red beans, the beans are cooked first with onion, green chili, garlic, tomato, bay leaf, touch of cumin and oregano, salt, and dry wine; before they soften completely, the raw rice is added, letting them cook together, until they consume the broth and the rice is dry and loose. The beans are also prepared in their broth with the rice separate.
- Dominican Republic:
  - Arroz con habichuelas: Red beans stewed with squash, cilantro, red onions, false oregano, garlic and tomato paste served with rice.
  - Moro de guandules: Rice cooked with false oregano, red onion, garlic, tomato paste, cubanelle peppers, cilantro, celery, chicken bouillon and pigeon peas. Less known ingredients used are culantro, bell peppers, vinegar, sour orange juice, olives, capers and aji dulce.
  - Moro de guandules con coco: Same as moro de guandules but adds coconut milk.
  - Moro de habichuelas: Identical to moro de guandules but replacing pigeon peas with red beans.
- Ecuador:

Menestra Is commonly made with Canario beans or Pinto beans. It is eaten with rice and usually has fried eggs or avocados on the side.

- El Salvador: Casamiento
- Guatemala: Casado: regionally known as gallo pinto and rice and beans. On the Caribbean coast and parts of eastern Guatemala (Izabal), it is known as rice and beans, and it includes coconut milk.
- Haiti: Sos pwa served with white rice
- Honduras: Casamiento; on the Caribbean coast, it is known as rice and beans, and it includes coconut milk and chili flakes.
- Hungary: Rakott zöldbab: Cooked rice, cooked green beans, and cooked minced meat are layered on one another, then topped with sour cream and baked in an oven.
- India: Rajma chawal, an Indian red bean dish served with rice
- Israel: Orez Shu'it, a traditional Israeli beans-and-rice dish
- Japan: Okowa, specifically sekihan, azuki beans and glutinous rice. In red bean mochi, the rice is processed into a bun form.
- Jamaica: Stew peas, in which rice and beans are cooked separately (similar to arroz con habichuelas and feijoada), and rice and peas
- Korea: Kongbap (bean rice), patbap (red bean rice)
- Liberia: Kidney beans can be eaten as a soup on top of rice during special occasions; however, in most parts of West Africa, beans are cooked separately from rice.
- Mexico: Rice and beans
- Nicaragua: Gallo pinto is Nicaragua's national dish. It is made with red beans, oregano, bell peppers, garlic and onions.
- Peru: There are two main variations:
  - Calentado
  - Tacu-tacu
- Philippines: Ginisang munggo is often paired and eaten with rice.
- Portugal:
  - Feijoada, a variety of main dishes made with rice and beans
  - Arroz de feijão, served as a side dish
- Puerto Rico:
  - Arroz con habichuelas: White rice with stew beans. The beans are typically stewed with potatoes, squash, pork, tomato sauce, sofrito, sazon, olives and capers.
  - Arroz junto and arroz con gandules: Both dishes are cooked in one pot with meat or fish, rice, olive oil or lard, tomato sauce, black pepper, broth, sofrito, sazón (cumin, annatto, coriander seeds, and turmeric or paprika), bay leaves, and beans. The rice is covered in banana leaves and a mix of mashed msquash, green bananas and green plantains.
  - Arroz mamposteao: Fried rice and beans. Day-old rice and stewed beans are fried together. Other ingredients can be added such as eggs, chicken, shrimp, cabbage, corn, soy sauce, or fish sauce. It is garnished with grated queso blanco and avocado.
- Suriname: Bruine bonen met rijst, one-pot dish with mixed meats and brown beans, served with rice.
- Turkey: Kuru fasulye ve pilav: national dish consisting of dried beans with pilaf
- United States:
  - Hoppin' John, a rice and cowpea dish from the southern United States. Made with field peas in the South Carolina Lowcountry and coastal Georgia where the dish originated, Hoppin' John is elsewhere commonly made with black-eyed peas.
  - Red beans and rice, the most common beans and rice dish in Louisiana Creole cuisine
- Venezuela: These dishes may include fried plantains called tajadas which are commonly found in many Venezuelan dishes:
  - Pabellón criollo: Made with rice, beans or refried black beans and well-seasoned shredded beef. It can then be surrounded by slices of ripe fried plantain, in which case the dish is called pabellón con barandas.
  - Arroz con caraotas: An alternate name for when pabellón criollo omits the fried plantains; it is colloquially known as "poor man's lunch" since it is more common in low-income families. Fried eggs can also be included.
  - Palo a pique llanero: Made with rice, brown beans and seasoned shredded beef, chicken, and pork. It is surrounded by slices of ripe plantain and pieces of potatoes. Some areas like Barinas, Apure or Bolivar add green plantains.

== Other languages ==
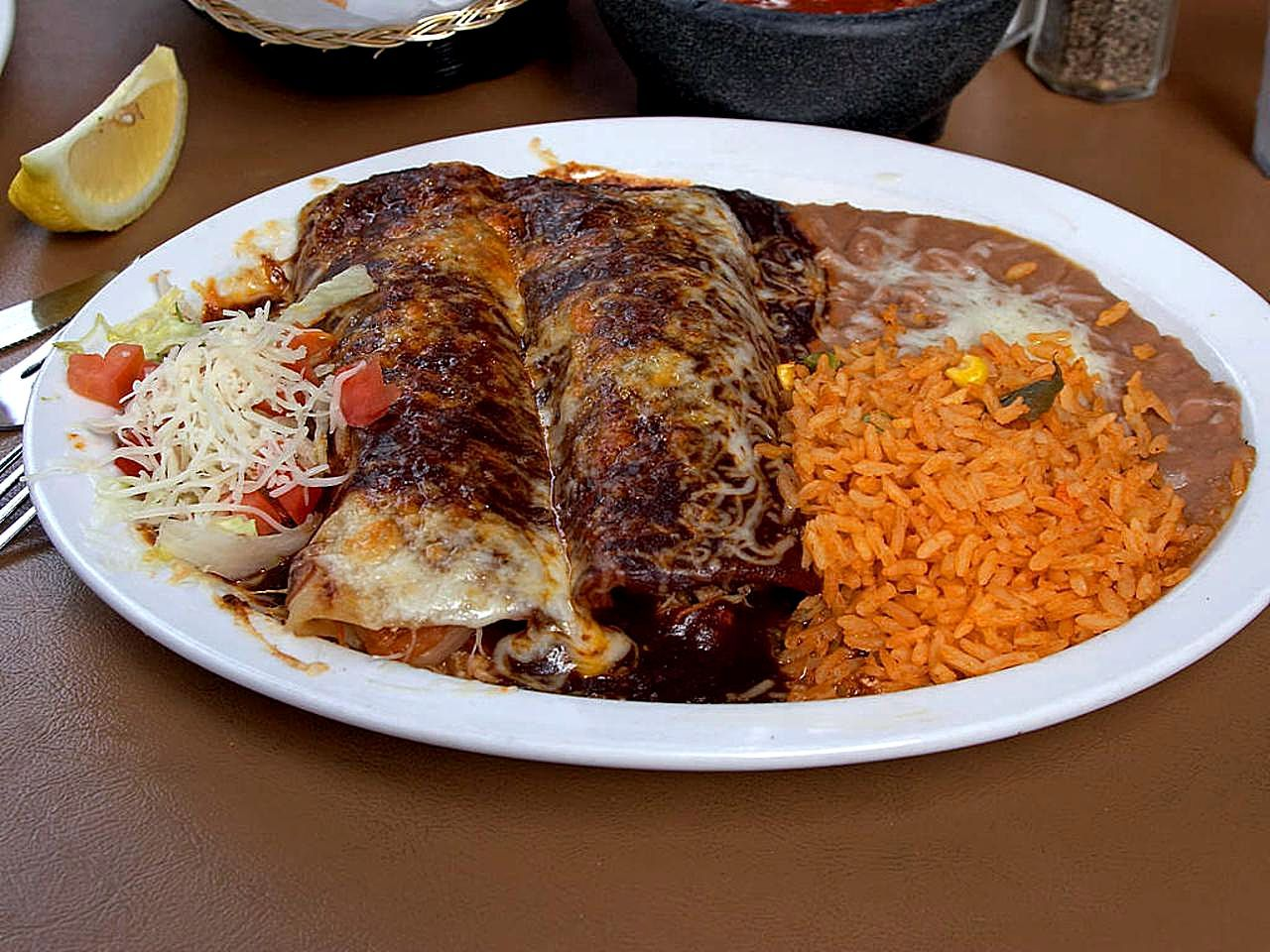
Enchiladas, Mexican rice and refried beans

Rice and beans is referred to as arroz y habas, arroz con habichuelas, arroz con frijoles, gallo pinto, recalentao or similar in Spanish; arroz e feijão, arroz com feijão or feijão com arroz in Portuguese; sos pwa in Haitian Creole; and avas kon arroz or avikas kon arroz in Judaeo-Spanish.

== See also ==
- Belizean cuisine
- Haitian cuisine
- Cuban cuisine
- Mexican cuisine
- List of legume dishes
- List of rice dishes

== Bibliography ==
- Embrapa, Origem e História do Arroz and Origem e História do Feijão (in Portuguese)
- Arroz e Feijão: Uma dupla infalível, Camaquã Alimentos (in Portuguese)
