= Gallo pinto =

Traditional dish from Central America

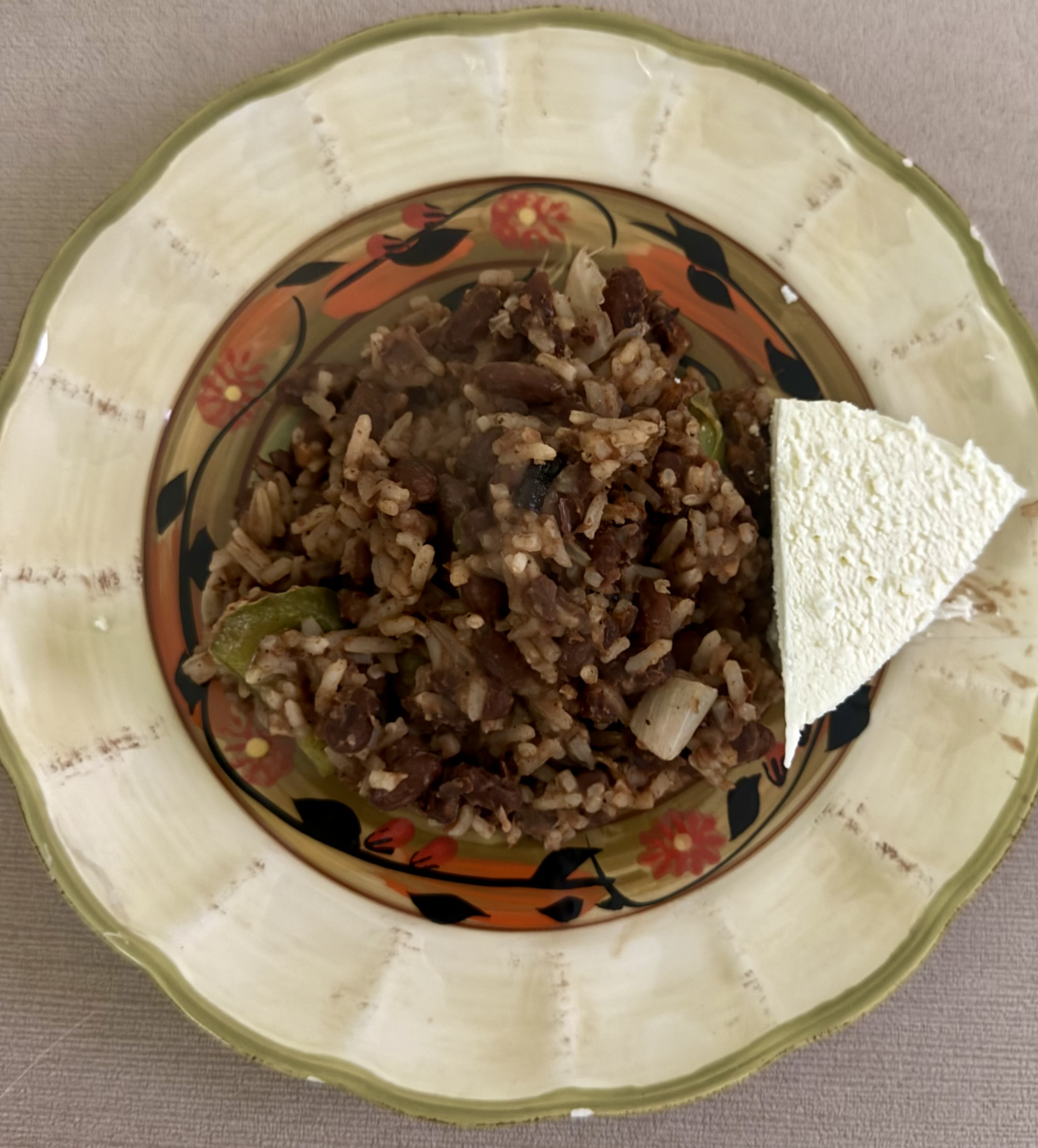
- Gallo pinto served with cheese
- Course: Main dish, side dish
- Place of origin: Costa Rica and Nicaragua
- Associated cuisine: Central American cuisine
- Serving temperature: Hot
- Main ingredients: Rice, beans
- Ingredients generally used: Onions, peppers, other seasonings
- Variations: Regional variations
- Food energy (per serving): 200 kcal (840 kJ)
Nutritional value
(per serving)
- Protein: 7 g
- Fat: 0.5 g
- Carbohydrate: 40 g

Gallo pinto or gallopinto is a traditional rice and bean dish from Central America. Consisting of rice and beans as a base, gallo pinto is important to both Nicaragua and Costa Rica, both of which consider it a national dish.

The beans in gallo pinto are cooked with garlic, oregano and onion. When the bean juice is in equal parts with the red beans, they are then combined with leftover or previously prepared rice. The rice in the Nicaraguan version is prepared with salt and onions.

== Etymology ==
Gallo pinto means 'spotted rooster' in Spanish. The name is said to originate in the multi-colored or speckled appearance that results from cooking the rice with black or red beans. The term may also be shortened to "pinto" depending on the region.

== History ==
It is uncertain and disputed which country is the precise origin of the dish. Both Nicaragua and Costa Rica claim it as their own, and its origin is a controversial subject between the two countries. There is general agreement that the dish's origins are Afro-Caribbean. The dish is mentioned in Carlos Luis Fallas' Mamita Yunai, which describes Costa Ricans and Nicaraguans working together on banana plantations encountering the dish and eventually taking it back home. According to anthropologist Teresa Preston-Werner, Fallas' "inclusion of pinto in the cultural landscape of the Caribbean coast demonstrates the meal’s ubiquity in daily life as early as the first part of the twentieth century".

In Costa Rica, the dish has an origin story involving a farmer in San Jose's San Sebastian neighborhood who told his friends and neighbors he was going to slaughter a speckled hen or gallo pinto for a feast day celebration for Saint Sebastian; when the people he had told interpreted this as an invitation to dinner, the hen wasn't enough to feed everyone, and he served rice and beans. It turned into a local joke, with people asking one another whether they'd gotten any of the farmer's gallo pinto, and the name for the dish spread throughout the country. Preston-Werner writes that the truth of the origin story is less important than the fact that it "provides a crucial cultural explanation for the origin of this ubiquitous food. In the case of pinto, a culturally adored foodway becomes grounded in time (the start of the twentieth century on the day of Saint Sebastián) and space (the town of San Sebastián by the Tiribi River)".

== Regional variations ==
=== Costa Rica ===
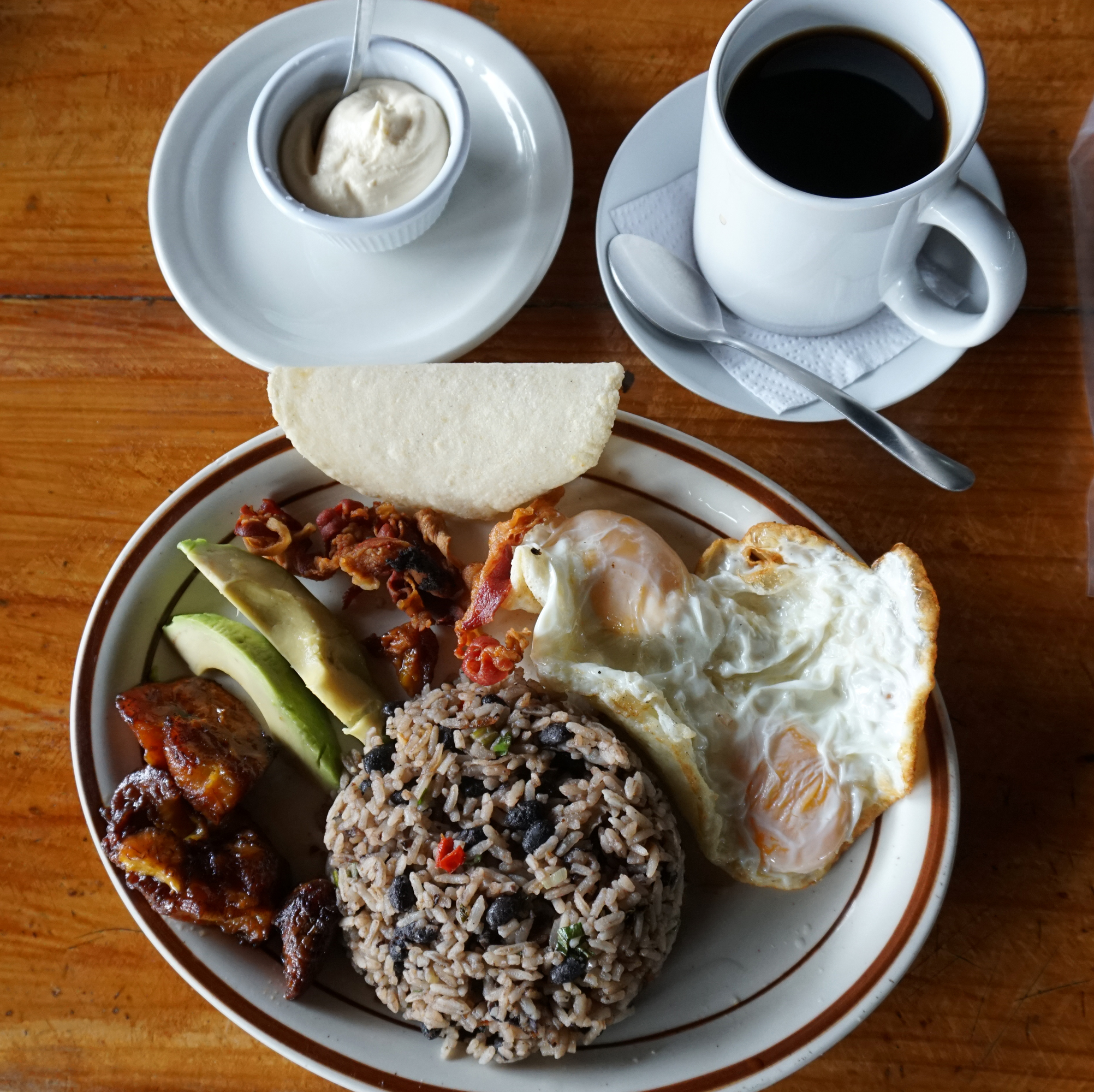
Costa Rican breakfast of gallo pinto, fried eggs, plantain, bacon, avocado, corn tortillas served with natilla and coffee

In Costa Rica it is eaten with Lizano sauce. Traditionally in home preparation the dish is made from leftover rice and beans from the previous day's meals. There are several regional variations: the Valle Central version, which is usually prepared with black beans, peppers, onions, and cilantro, and often includes Lizano sauce in the recipe; and the Guanacaste version, which is usually prepared with red beans and is fattier. A third version includes coconut milk.

The dish is often eaten for breakfast, and every breakfast typically includes it, but it is also eaten for other meals or for a snack. As a breakfast dish it is often served with some combination of eggs, fried plantains, corn tortillas, fried cheese, meat and fruit, and is often accompanied by natilla. It is often served as a side dish at lunch.

=== Nicaragua ===
In Nicaragua, where it is also called gallo pinto, it is traditionally prepared with red silk beans and onions, usually cooked in vegetable oil, although animal fats such as lard are occasionally used. Recipes typically call for fewer ingredients than Costa Rican recipes. In some recipes aromatics are left in large chunks and removed before serving. When prepared at home it traditionally uses day-old rice to allow the rice to dry out slightly so that grains are separated.

The dish is eaten at any time of the day. It is commonly sold in fritangas, where it is served as a companion to various dishes. The dish is eaten at any meal. In some homes it is served at every meal. It is often served garnished with sour cream and chilero (a slaw-like side dish consisting of fermented onions, carrots, and chili peppers). It is also typically accompanied by tortilla, eggs, and cheese.

=== Other cuisines ===
The dish is also known in Panamanian cuisine and in Guatemalan cuisine.

== Contention ==
According to Costa Rica the dish dates to 1930s San Jose. According to Nicaragua it is based on a dish that was brought to the country by enslaved Africans much earlier.

In 2003, the government of Costa Rica held an event at which nearly 1000 pounds of gallo pinto was cooked and served; the event was recorded in the Guinness Book of World Records. Nicaragua responded by preparing and serving 1200 pounds. The competitions became an annual Gallo Pinto Day. The competition between the two countries over ownership of the dish is sometimes referred to as the "Gallo Pinto War".

== Cultural importance ==
The dish is culturally important in both Costa Rica and Nicaragua.

The dish is a national dish of Costa Rica and is the country's best known dish. The phrase más tico que el gallo pinto (more Costa Rican than spotted rooster) is a common saying in Costa Rica. It is on the menu of most Costa Rican restaurants. According to Costa Rican chef and food writer Isabel Campabadal, "If any one dish defines Costa Rican cuisine, it is gallo pinto". According to anthropologist Theresa Preston-Werner, the dish is "ubiquitous" in any Costa Rican breakfast.

The dish is a staple in Nicaragua and considered one of its national dishes. In 2019 Daniel Ortega proposed that Nicaragua needed to develop a "gallo pinto" economy, which Confidencial described as one that "appeal[ed] to the creativity and resistance of Nicaraguans to endure the hardships of an economic debacle caused by himself".

== See also ==
- List of legume dishes
- List of rice dishes
