= Bouillon =

Bouillon can refer to:

== Food ==
- Bouillon (broth), a simple broth
  - Court-bouillon, a quick broth
- Bouillon (soup), a Haitian soup
- Bouillon (restaurant), a traditional type of French restaurant
  - Bouillon Chartier, a bouillon restaurant founded in 1896
- Bouillon (grape), another name for the French wine grape Folle Blanche
- Bouillon cube, used in cooking, especially in soups

== People ==
- Cardinal de Bouillon, French prelate and diplomat born Emmanuel Théodose de La Tour d'Auvergne (1643–1715)
- Christophe Bouillon (born 1969), member of the National Assembly of France
- Duchess of Bouillon, a French title since the 10th century
- Francis Bouillon, a defenseman for the Montreal Canadiens hockey team
- Godfrey de Bouillon, a Lord of Bouillon and a leader of the First Crusade
- Jean Bouillon (1926–2009), Belgian marine biologist
- Jean-Claude Bouillon (1941–2017), French actor
- Klaus Bouillon (born 1947), German politician
- Lords of Bouillon, French titles during the Middle Ages in Lower Lorraine
- Marc Bouillon (born 1968), Belgian cyclist
- Sophie Bouillon (born 1984), French journalist
- Stéphane Bouillon (born 1957), French civil servant

== Places ==
- Bouillon, Belgium, a town in Belgium
  - Bouillon Castle, a medieval castle in Belgium
  - Duchy of Bouillon, a domain that existed between 1291 and 1806
  - Republic of Bouillon, a short-lived successor to the Duchy of Bouillon
- Bouillon, Pyrénées-Atlantiques, a commune in southwestern France
- Le Bouillon, a commune in northwestern France

== Other ==
- Bouillon de culture, a French television show
