= Bullion (surname) =

Bullion is a surname. Notable people with the surname include:

- Angélique Bullion, French benefactress influential in the foundation of Quebec
- Laura Bullion (1876–1961), American female outlaw of the Old West
- Stéphane Bullion (born 1980), French Etoile dancer of the Paris Opera Ballet
- Claude de Bullion (1569–1640), French aristocrat and politician
