= Black-eyed pea =

Subspecies of cowpea plant

Black-eyed peas
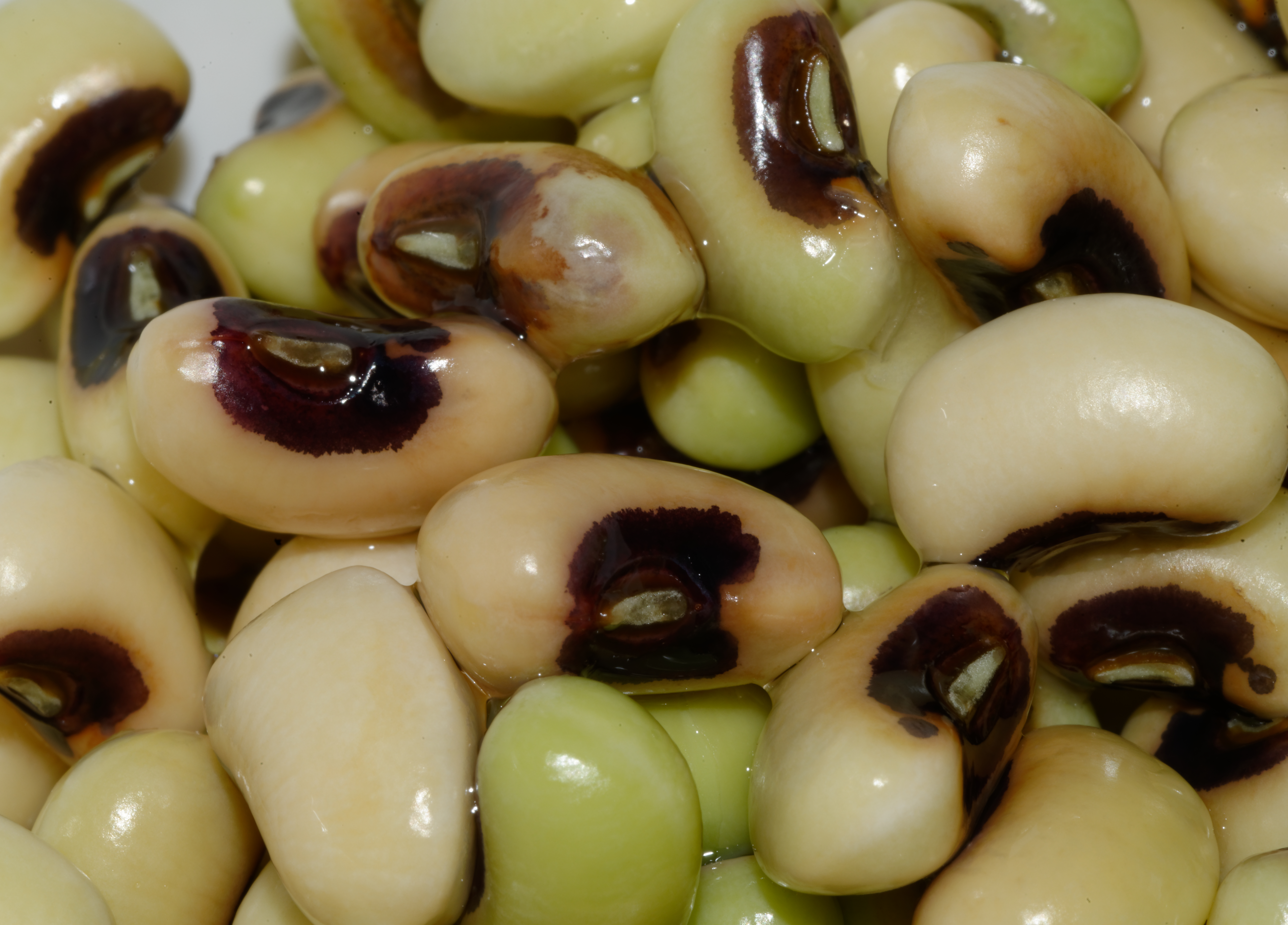
- Fresh black-eyed peas
- Species: Vigna unguiculata (L.) Walp.
- Cultivar group: Unguiculata
- Cultivar: Black-eyed peas
- Origin: West Africa
- Cultivar group members: lobia

The black-eyed pea or black-eyed bean is a legume grown around the world for its medium-sized, edible bean. It is a subspecies of the cowpea, an Old World plant domesticated in Africa, and is sometimes simply called a cowpea.

The common commercial variety is called the California Blackeye; it is pale-colored with a prominent black spot. The American South has countless varieties, many of them heirloom, that vary in size from the small lady peas to very large ones. The color of the eye may be black, brown, red, pink, or green. All the peas are green when freshly shelled and brown or buff when dried. A popular variation of the black-eyed pea is the purple hull pea or mud-in-your-eye pea; it is usually green with a prominent purple or pink spot.

The currently accepted botanical name for the black-eyed pea is Vigna unguiculata subsp. unguiculata, although previously it was classified in the genus Phaseolus. Vigna unguiculata subsp. dekindtiana is the wild relative and Vigna unguiculata subsp. sesquipedalis is the related asparagus bean. Other beans of somewhat similar appearance, such as the frijol ojo de cabra (goat's-eye bean) of northern Mexico, are sometimes incorrectly called black-eyed peas, and vice versa.

== History ==
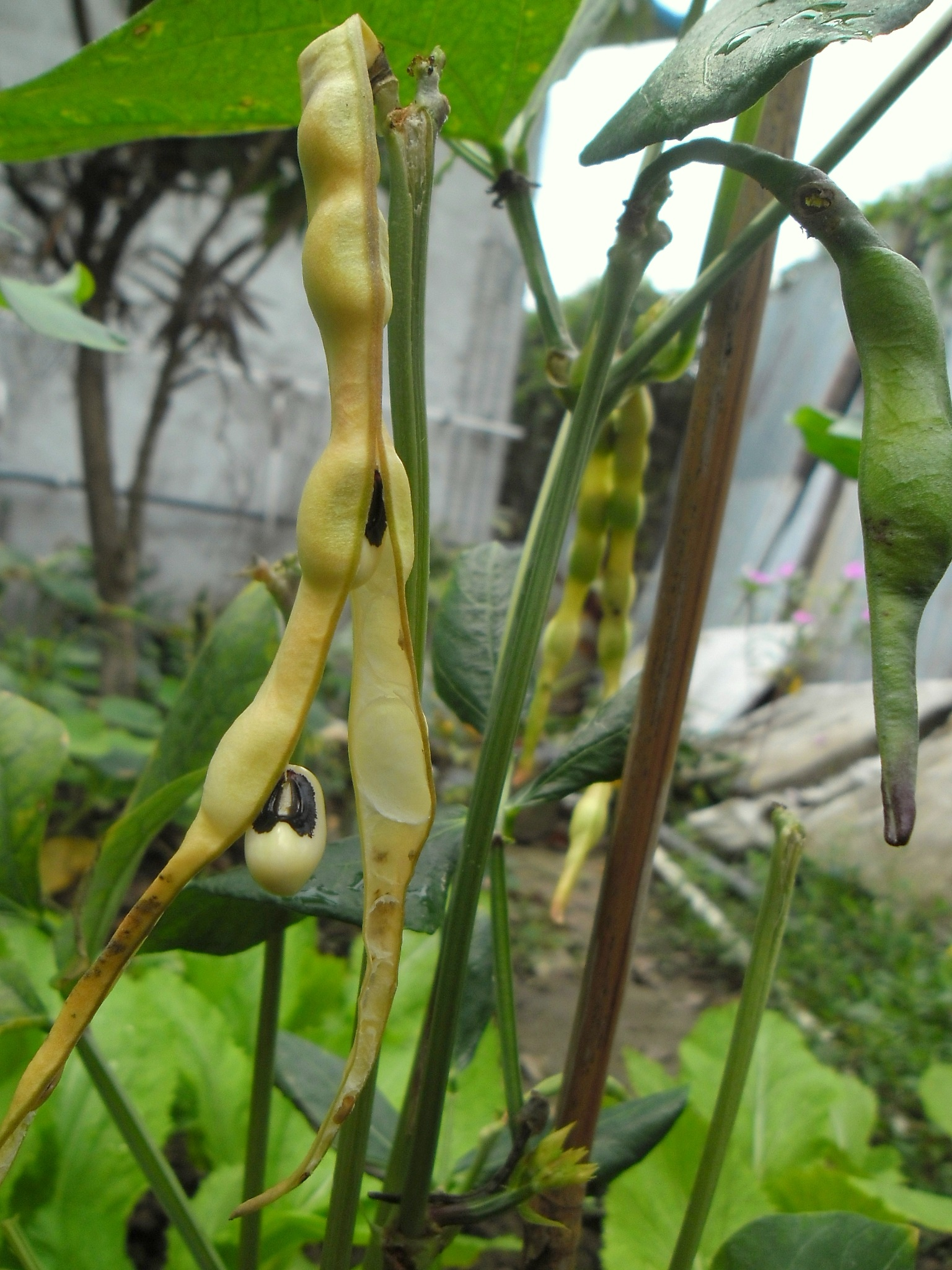
Ripe, opened black-eyed pea in pod and developing pods

The black-eyed pea originates from West Africa and has been cultivated in China and India since prehistoric times. It was grown in Virginia since the 17th century by African slaves who were brought to America along with the indigenous plants from their homelands. The crop would also eventually prove popular in Texas. The planting of crops of black-eyed peas was promoted by George Washington Carver because, as a legume, it adds nitrogen to the soil and has high nutritional value. Throughout the South, the black-eyed pea is still a widely used ingredient today in soul food and cuisines of the Southern United States. The black-eye pea is cultivated throughout the world.

== Cultivation ==
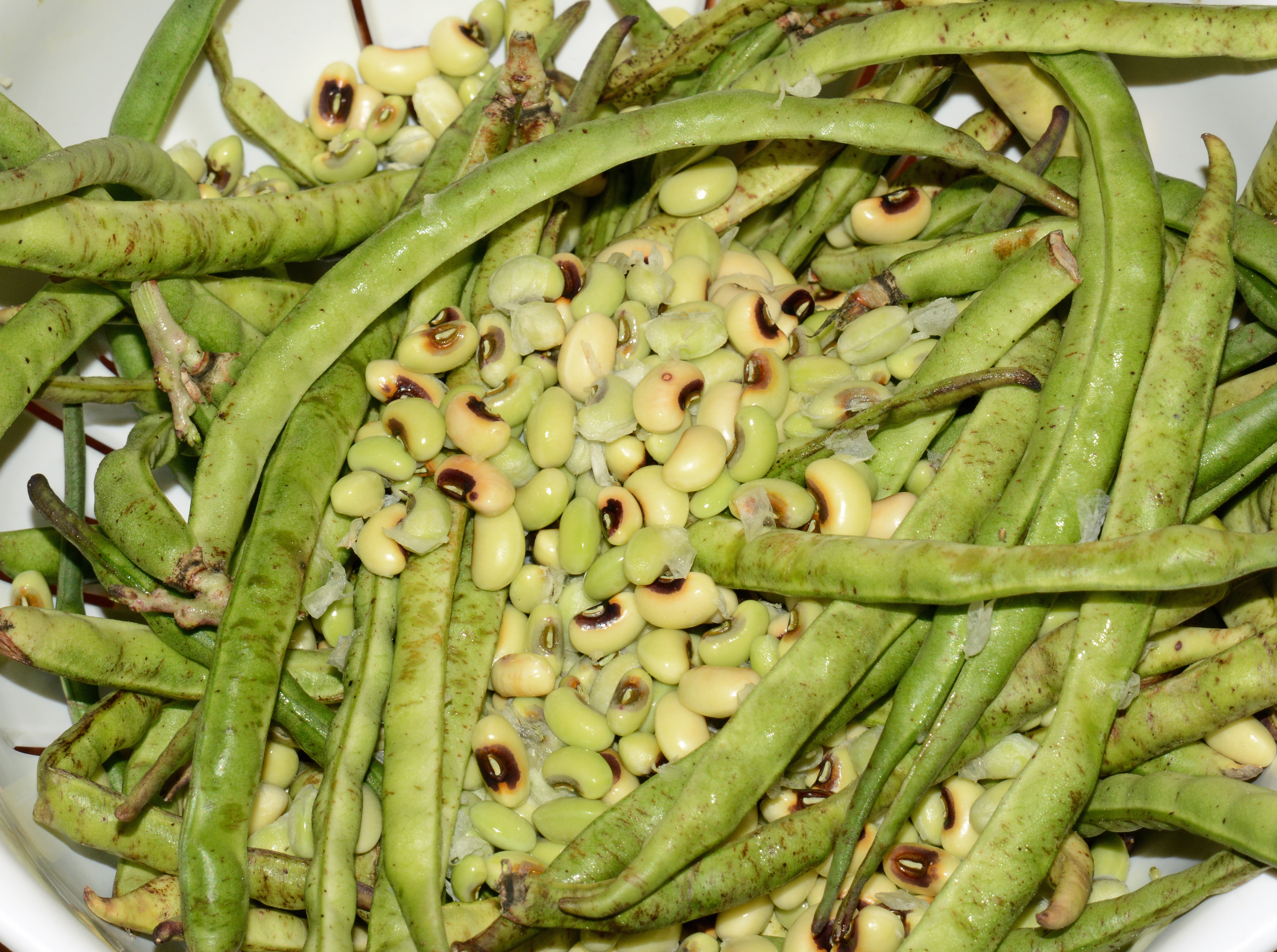
Black-eyed peas, in and out of the shell

In non-tropical climates, this heat-loving crop should be sown after all danger of frost has passed and the soil is warm. Seeds sown too early will rot before germination. Black-eyed peas are extremely drought tolerant, so excessive watering should be avoided.

The crop is relatively free of pests and disease. Root-knot nematodes can be a problem, especially if crops are not rotated. As a nitrogen-fixing legume, fertilization can exclude nitrogen three weeks after germination.

The blossom produces nectar plentifully, and large areas can be a source of honey. Because the bloom attracts a variety of pollinators, care must be taken in the application of insecticides to avoid label violations.

After planting the pea, it should start to grow after 2–5 days.

== Lucky New Year food ==
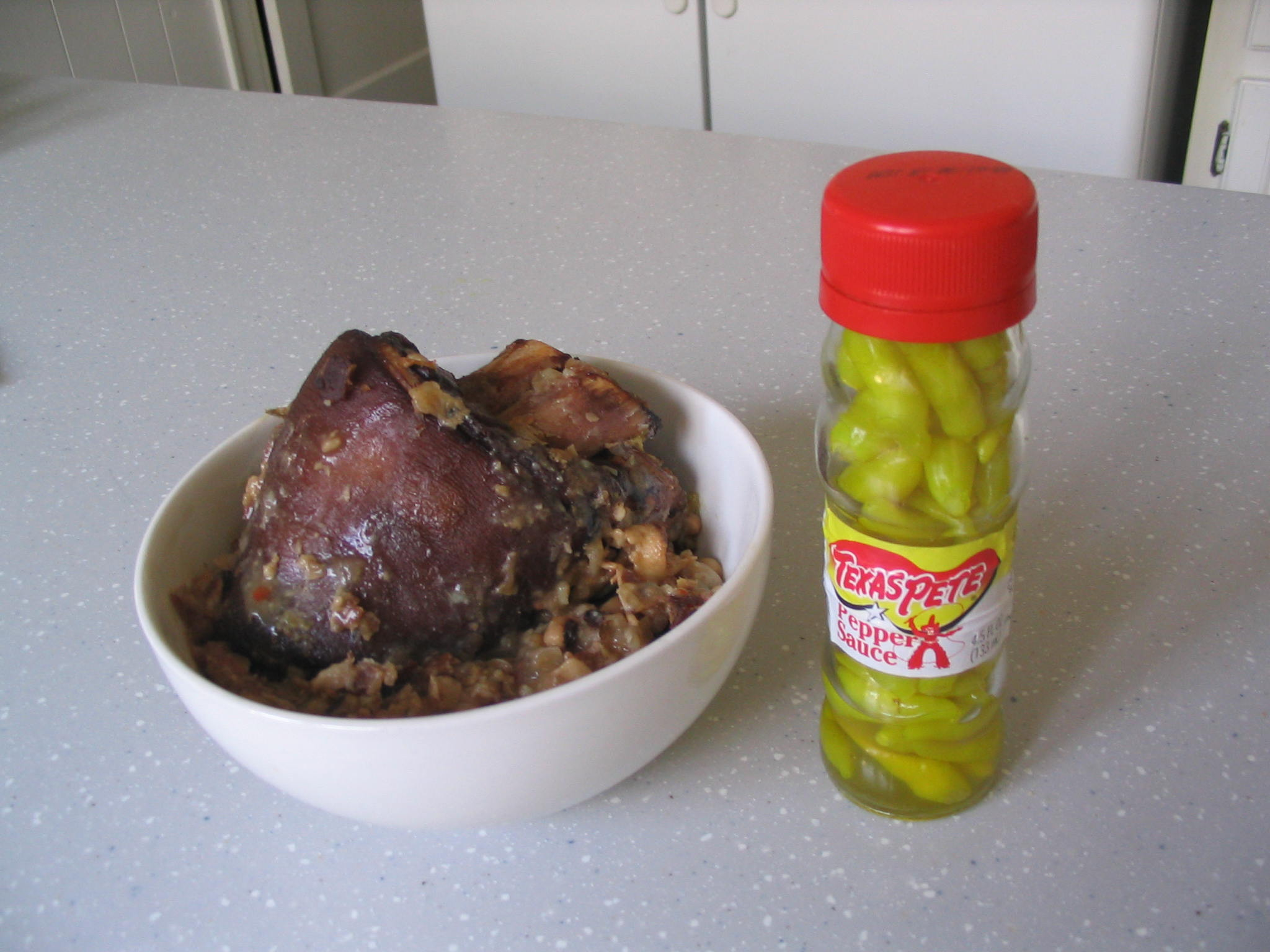
New Year's Day in Alabama: black-eyed peas, ham hock, and pepper sauce

In African-American Hoodoo, eating black-eyed peas or Hoppin' John (a traditional soul food) on New Year's Day is thought to bring prosperity in the new year. The peas are typically cooked with a pork product for flavoring (such as bacon, fatback, ham bones, or hog jowls) and diced onion, and served with a hot chili sauce or a pepper-flavored vinegar. The traditional meal also includes cabbage, collard, turnip, or mustard greens, and ham. The peas, since they swell when cooked, symbolize prosperity; the greens symbolize money; the pork, because pigs root forward when foraging, represents positive motion. It is similar to the Ghanaian dish, waakye. Cornbread, which represents gold, also often accompanies this meal.

Several legends exist as to the origin of this custom. Two popular explanations for the South's association with peas and good luck date back to the American Civil War. The first is associated with General William T. Sherman's march of the Union Army to the sea, during which they pillaged the Confederate food supplies. Stories say peas and salt pork were said to have been left untouched, because of the belief that they were animal food unfit for human consumption. Southerners considered themselves lucky to be left with some supplies to help them survive the winter, and black-eyed peas evolved into a representation of good luck. One challenge to this legend is that General Sherman brought backup supplies with him including three days of animal feed and would have been unlikely to have left even animal feed untouched. In addition, the dates of the first average frost for Atlanta and Savannah, respectively, are November 13 and November 28. As Sherman's march was from November 15 to December 21, 1864, it is improbable, although possible, that the Union Army would have come across standing fields of black-eyed peas as relayed in most versions of the legend. In another Southern tradition, black-eyed peas were a symbol of emancipation for African-Americans who had previously been enslaved, and who after the Civil War were officially freed on New Year's Day.

Other Southern American traditions point to Jews of Ashkenazi and Sephardic ancestry in Southern cities and plantations eating the peas.

== Culinary uses worldwide ==
=== Africa and the Middle East ===
In Egypt, black-eyed peas are called lobia. When cooked with onions, garlic, meat and tomato juice, and served with Egyptian rice with some pastina called shaerya mixed in, they make the most famous rice dish in Egypt.

In Jordan, Lebanon, and Syria, lobya or green black-eyed beans are cooked with onion, garlic, tomatoes, peeled and chopped, olive oil, salt and black pepper.

In Nigeria and Ghana within West Africa and the Caribbean, a traditional dish called akara or koose comprises mashed black-eyed peas with added salt, onions and/or peppers. The mixture is then fried. In Nigeria a pudding called 'moin-moin' is made from ground and mixed peas with seasoning as well as some plant proteins before it is steamed. This is served with various carbohydrate-rich foods such as pap, rice or garri. It is also use to make waakye (a Ghanaian rice and beans meal).

=== South Asia ===
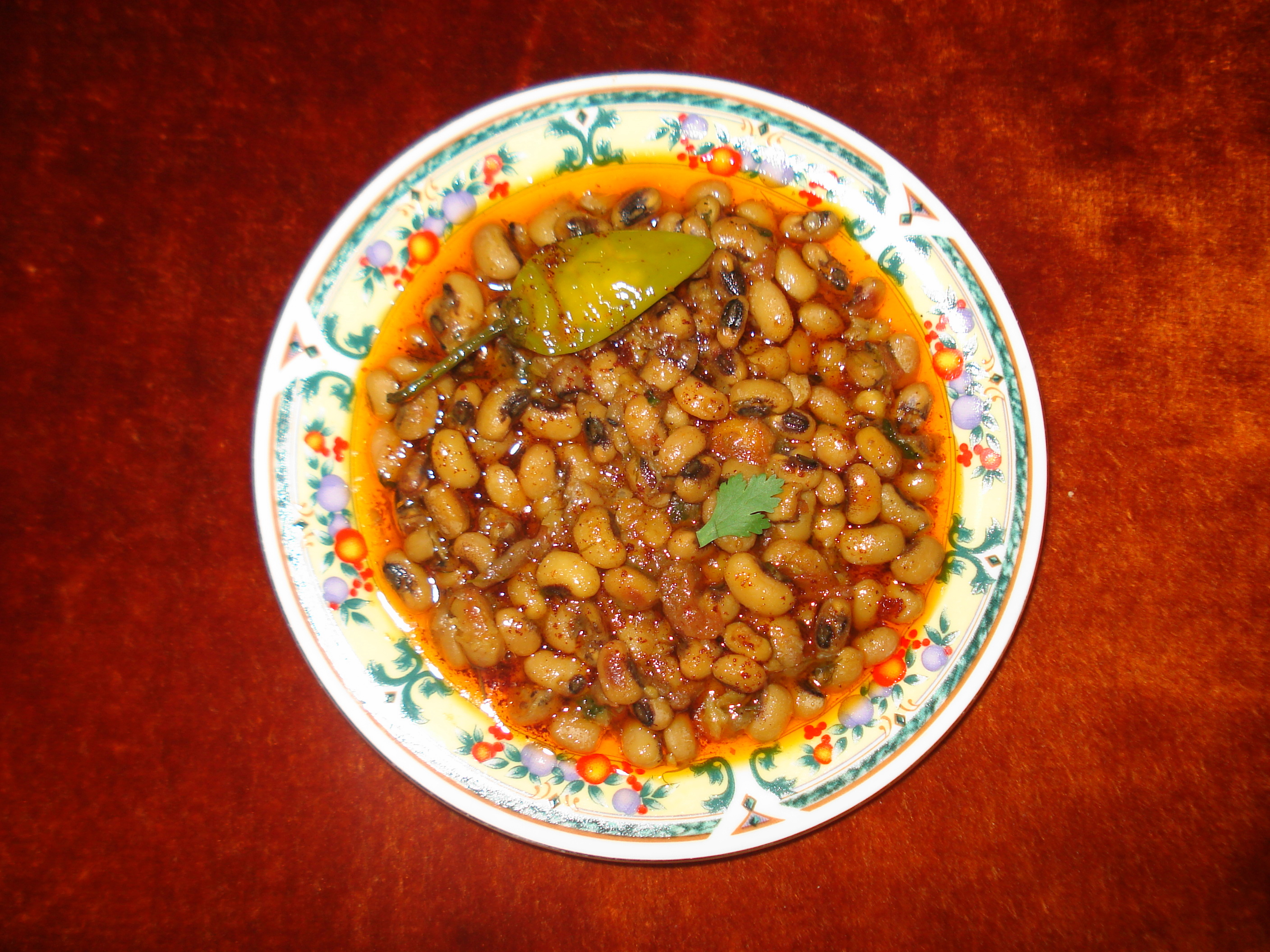
Lobia curry, a black-eyed peas dish from India

The bean is commonly used across India, Nepal, Pakistan and Bangladesh. In Hindi, Punjabi and Nepali languages of North India, Pakistan and Nepal, black-eyed peas are called lobia (लोबीया / ਲੋਬੀਆ) or rongi (रोंगी / ਰੌਁਗੀ). They are cooked like daal and served with boiled rice.

In Gujarat, they are called suki choli/choli (Gujarati- સુકી ચોળી/ચોળી).

In Bengali speaking parts of India (West Bengal) and Bangladesh, they are known as borboti kolai (Bengali-বরবটি কলাই).

In Odisha, they are called jhudanga/jhunga (Odia- ଝୁଡ଼ଙ୍ଗ/ଝୁଙ୍ଗ).

In Assam, they are called lesera maah (Assamese- লেচৰা মাহ).

In Goa and other Konkani speaking areas of India, lobia/black eyed beans are called bogdo /chawli (Konkani- बोग्डो/चवळी).

In Maharashtra, they are called chawli (Marathi- चवळी) and made into a curry called chawli amti or chawli usal.

In Karnataka, they are called alsande kalu (Kannada- ಅಲಸಂದೆ ಕಾಳು) and used in the preparation of huli, a popular type of curry.

In the coastal areas of southern Karnataka like South Kanara district, they are called as lathanay bitt in Tulu language (Tulu- ಲತ್ತಣೆ ಬಿತ್ತ) and are cooked in spiced coconut paste to make a saucy curry or a dry coconut curry.

In Tamil Nadu, they are called karamani/thattapayaru (Tamil- காரமணி/தட்டப்பயிறு) and used in various recipes, including being boiled and made into a salad-like sundal (often during the Ganesh Chaturthi and Navratri festivals).

In Andhra Pradesh and Telangana, they are known by the name bobbarlu/alasandalu kura (Telugu- బొబ్బర్లు/అలసందలు కూర), and are used for variety of recipes, most popularly for Vada.

In Kerala, they are called vellapayar (Malayalam-വെളളപയർ) and is a part of the Sadhya dish, Olan.

=== Southeast Asia ===
The bean is commonly used in Indonesia and it has various names across the country. In Indonesian, black-eyed peas are called kacang tunggak, in Javanese, it's called kacang tolo. Other names for the bean are kacang dadap, kacang otok, and kacang landes. They are commonly used in dishes such as sambal goreng krecek, brongkos, kukumbu, and lentho

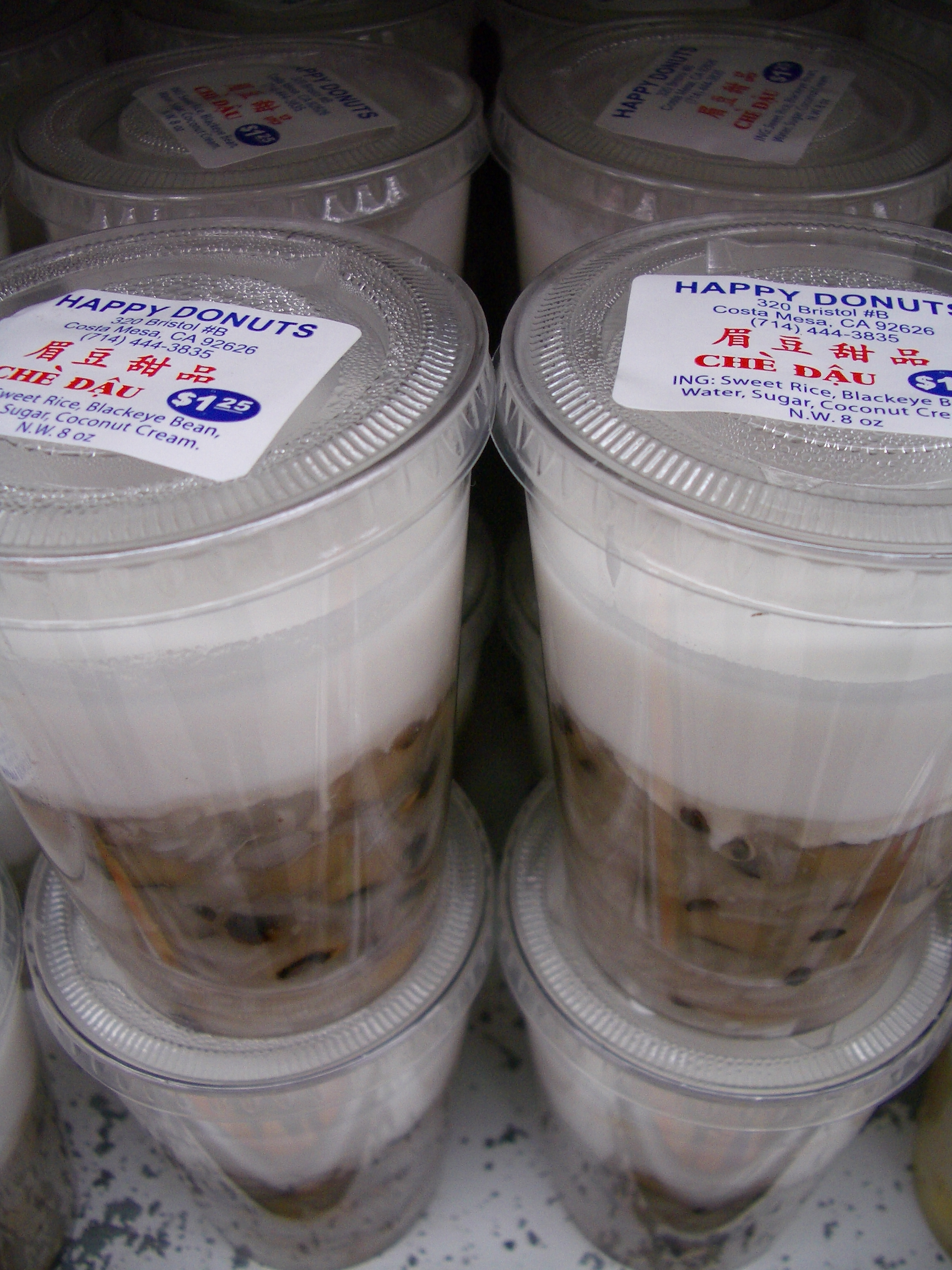
Several cups of chè đậu trắng, a Vietnamese dessert made with black-eyed peas

In Vietnam, black-eyed peas are used in a sweet dessert called chè đậu trắng (black-eyed peas and sticky rice with coconut milk).

=== Europe ===
In Cyprus (φρέσκο λουβί (fresko luvi)), Greece (μαυρομάτικα) and Turkey (börülce salatası), blanched black-eyed peas are eaten as salad with a dressing of olive oil, salt, lemon juice, onions and garlic.

In Portugal, black-eyed peas are served with boiled cod and potatoes, with tuna, and in salads.

=== The Americas ===
==== North America ====
"Hoppin' John", made of black-eyed peas or field peas, rice, and pork, is a traditional dish in parts of the Southern United States.

Texas caviar, another traditional dish in the American South, is made from black-eyed peas marinated in vinaigrette-style dressing and chopped garlic.

==== South America ====
In Brazil's northeastern state of Bahia, especially in the city of Salvador, black-eyed peas (named "feijão fradinho" there) are used in a traditional street food of West African cuisine origin called acarajé. The beans are peeled and mashed, and the resulting paste is made into balls and deep-fried in dendê. Acarajé is typically served split in half and stuffed with vatapá, caruru, diced green and red tomatoes, fried sun-dried shrimp and homemade hot sauce.

In the northern part of Colombia, they are used to prepare a fritter called buñuelo. The beans are immersed in water for a few hours to loosen their skins and soften them. The skins are then removed either by hand or with the help of a manual grinder. Once the skins are removed, the bean is ground or blended, and eggs are added, which produces a soft mix. The mix is fried in hot oil. It makes a nutritious breakfast meal.

In Guyana, South America, and Trinidad and Tobago, it is one of the most popular type of beans cooked with rice, the main one being red kidney beans, also referred to as red beans. It is also cooked as a snack or appetizer on its own. On New Year's Eve (referred to as Old Year's Night in Guyana and Suriname), families cook a traditional dish called cook-up rice. The dish comprises rice, black-eyed peas, and other peas and a variety of meats cooked in coconut milk and seasonings. According to tradition, cook-up rice should be the first thing consumed in the New Year for good luck. Cook-up rice is also made as an everyday dish.

== Nutrition ==
Mature black-eyed peas cooked, no salt
Nutritional value per 100 g (3.5 oz)
- Energy: 484 kJ (116 kcal)
- Carbohydrates: 20.76 g
- Sugars: 3.3 g
- Dietary fiber: 6.5 g
- Fat: 0.53 g
- Protein: 7.73 g
Vitamins and minerals
Vitamins	Quantity %DV^{†}
Thiamine (B1)	17% 0.202 mg
Riboflavin (B2)	4% 0.055 mg
Niacin (B3)	3% 0.495 mg
Pantothenic acid (B5)	8% 0.411 mg
Vitamin B6	6% 0.1 mg
Folate (B9)	52% 208 μg
Vitamin E	2% 0.28 mg
Vitamin K	1% 1.7 μg
Minerals	Quantity %DV^{†}
Calcium	2% 24 mg
Iron	14% 2.51 mg
Magnesium	13% 53 mg
Manganese	21% 0.475 mg
Phosphorus	12% 156 mg
Potassium	9% 278 mg
Sodium	0% 4 mg
Zinc	12% 1.29 mg
- Link to USDA Database entry
- ^{†}Percentages estimated using US recommendations for adults, except for potassium, which is estimated based on expert recommendation from the National Academies.

One 100 g serving of cooked black-eyed peas contains 484 kilojoules (116 kilocalories) of food energy and is an excellent source of folate and a good source of thiamine, iron, magnesium, manganese, phosphorus, and zinc. The legume is also a good source of dietary fiber (6.5 g per 100 g serving) and contains a moderate amount of numerous other vitamins and minerals (table).

== See also ==
- Adzuki bean
- Chickpea
- Dixie Lee pea
- Green bean
- Lentil
- List of diseases of the common bean
- Mung bean
- Organic beans
- Pulse (legume)
- Sea Island red pea
- Vicia faba
