= Stéphane Bouillon =

French civil servant (born 1957)

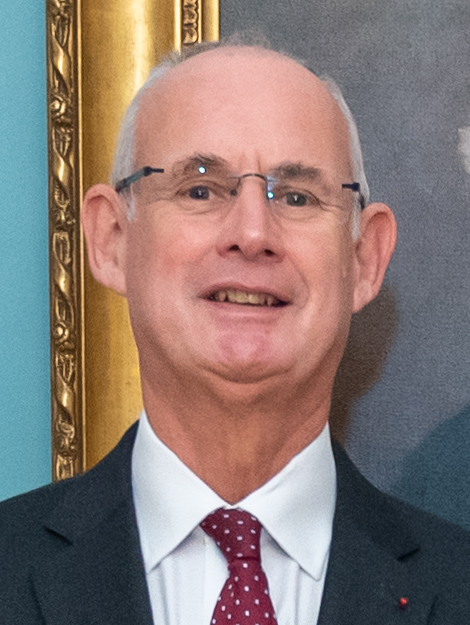
- Bouillon in 2022

Secretary-General for National Defence and Security
- In office 17 August 2020 – 2 March 2025
- Preceded by: Claire Landais
- Succeeded by: Nicolas Roche

Personal details
- Born: 9 March 1957 (age 69)

Stéphane Bouillon (born 9 March 1957) is a French civil servant. From 2020 to 2025, he served as secretary-general for national defence and security. From 2018 to 2020, he served as chief of staff to interior minister Christophe Castaner. From 2017 to 2018, he served as prefect of Auvergne-Rhône-Alpes. From 2015 to 2017, he served as prefect of Provence-Alpes-Côte d'Azur. From 2012 to 2015, he served as prefect of Alsace. From 2011 to 2012, he served as chief of staff to interior minister Claude Guéant. From 2008 to 2011, he served as prefect of Corsica. From 2006 to 2007, he served as prefect of Loire. From 2003 to 2006, he served as prefect of Sarthe. In 2001, he served as prefect of Aube.
