= Bullion, Nevada =

Ghost town in Elko County, Nevada, United States

- Ghost town
- Location within the state of Nevada Bullino (the United States)
- Coordinates: 40°31′26″N 115°59′47″W
- Country: United States
- State: Nevada
- County: Elko
- Elevation: 6,670 ft (2,030 m)
- Time zone: UTC-8 (Pacific (PST))
  - Summer (DST): UTC-7 (PDT)
- GNIS feature ID: 839181

Bullion is a ghost town in Elko County, Nevada, United States.

== History ==
Bullion was established in 1870 after the discovery of silver. Several smelters were built in the town. In 1871, Bullion had a hotel, two saloons, a merchandise store, and 12 houses, three years after Bullion started a period of great crisis with a great exodus of population. At present nothing remains but large slag heaps, smelter foundations, stone ruins, and a small cemetery.

== See also ==
- List of ghost towns in Nevada
