= Waakye =

Ghanaian food

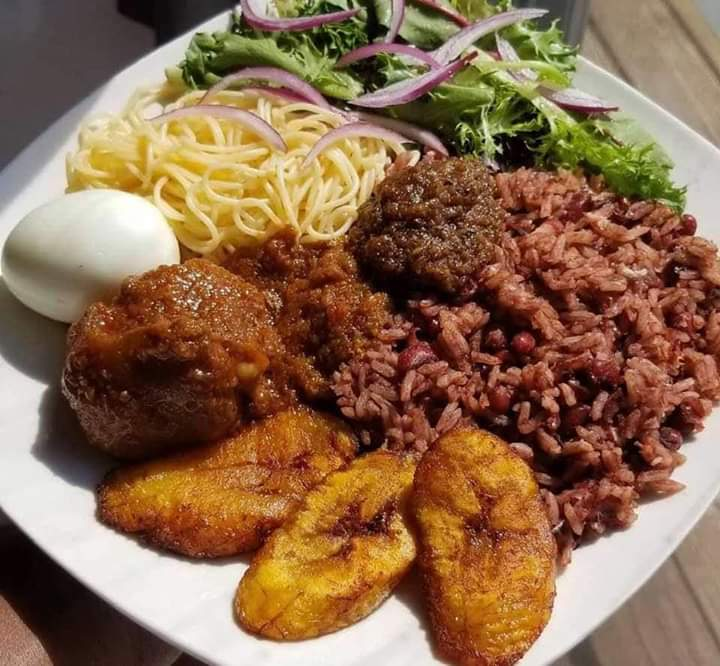
- Alternative names: Wakey
- Type: Rice
- Place of origin: Ghana
- Created by: Northern Region (Ghana); Zongo
- Serving temperature: mostly hot
- Main ingredients: beans and rice

Waakye (/ˈwɑːtʃeɪ/ WAH-chay) is a Ghanaian dish of cooked rice and beans, commonly eaten for breakfast or lunch. Rice and beans, usually black eyed peas or cow beans, are cooked together, along with red dried sorghum leaf sheaths or stalks and kaun (powdered limestone). The sorghum leaves and limestone give the dish its characteristic flavor and a red appearance and the sorghum is taken out before consumption. The word waakye is from the Dagbani language and refers to a particular kind of bean. In Hausa, the bean and the dish are called wake, a contracted form of the full name shinkafa da wake which means rice and beans.

Waakye is commonly sold by roadside vendors. It is then commonly wrapped in banana leaf and accompanied by one or more of Wele stew, boiled chicken eggs, garri, shito, vegetable salad of cabbage, onions and tomatoes, spaghetti (which is called talia in Ghana) or fried plantain.

== History ==
It is thought to have originated in northern Ghana among the Mole-Dagbon people. The dish is also common among Hausa settlers in the Zongo communities of southern Ghana. It may be the precursor of the rice and beans dishes commonly found in the Caribbean and South America, brought there through the slave trade.

== Gallery ==
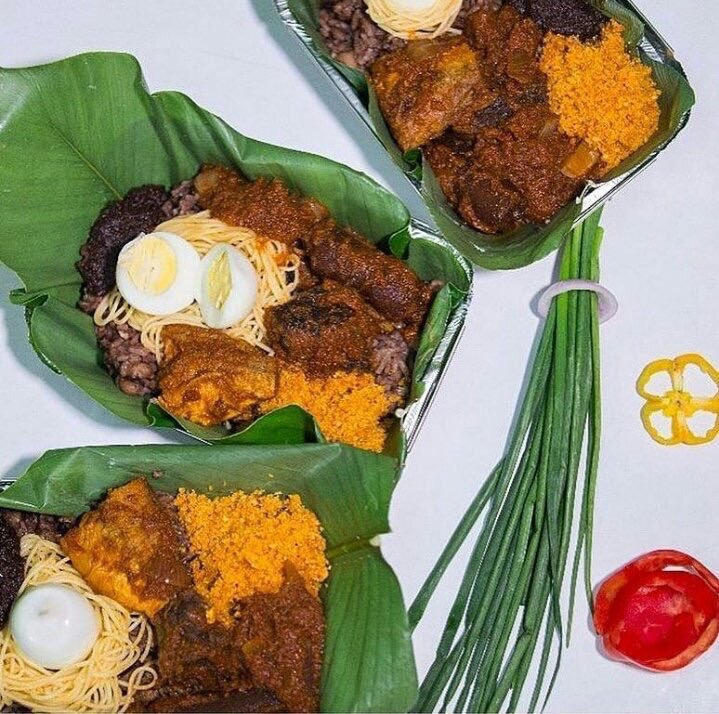
Waakye served in Ketemfe leaves

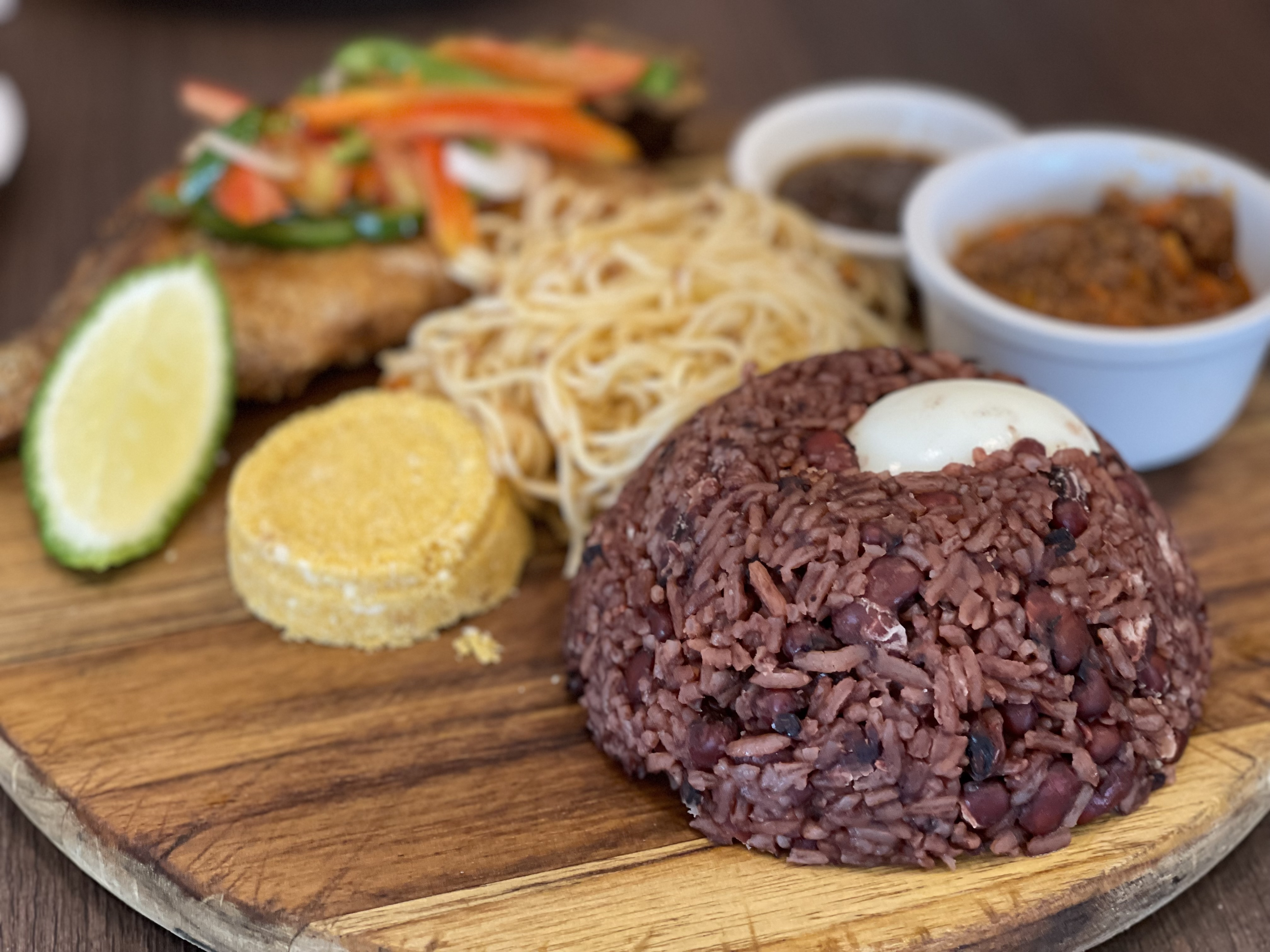
Waakye

== See also ==
- Imoro Muniratu (Auntie Muni)
- Rice and beans
- Cuisine of Ghana
- List of African dishes
