= Mount Bullion, Alpine County, California =

Mount Bullion
- Former settlement
- Location in California
- Coordinates: 38°39′38″N 119°43′35″W
- Country: United States
- State: California
- County: Alpine
- Elevation: 5,712 ft (1,741 m)

Mount Bullion (also Bulliona, Bullona, Bullionae, and Bullion) is a former mining town in Alpine County, California, United States. It was located at the confluence of the Carson River and Monitor Creek, at an elevation of 5712 feet (1741 m).
