= Carolina Gold =

Variety of rice

Carolina Gold rice
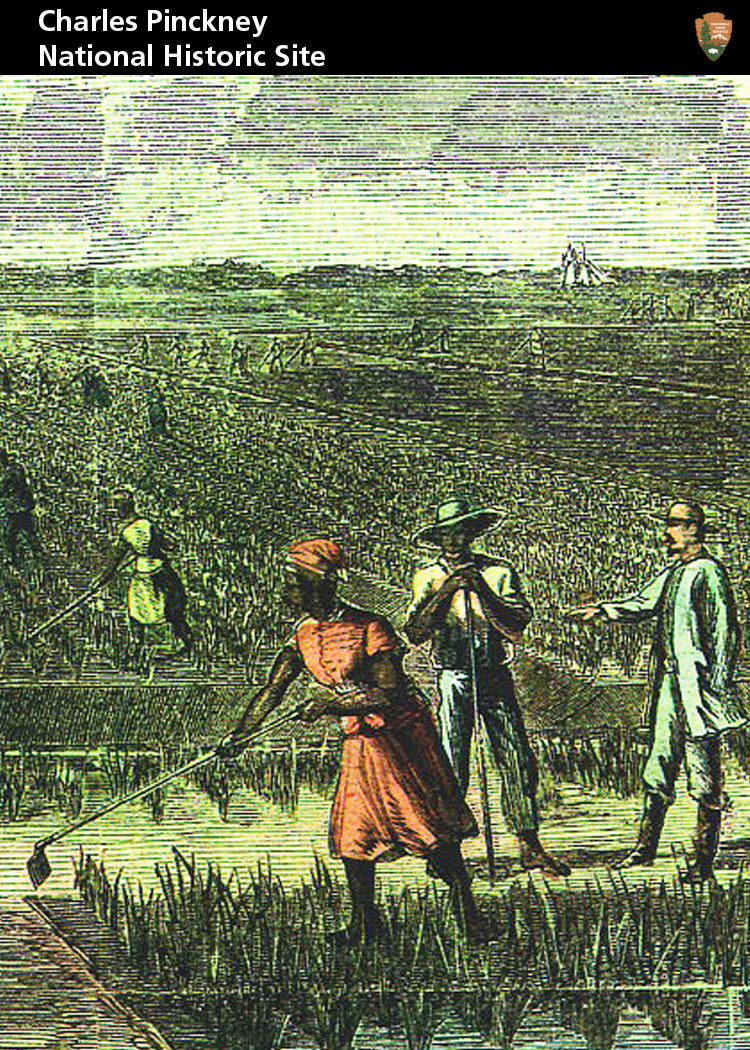
- Enslaved Africans cultivating Carolina gold rice in South Carolina on Snee farm plantation.
- Species: Oryza sativa
- Origin: South Carolina Lowcountry and the Sea Islands

Carolina Gold rice is a variety of Oryza sativa first popularized in South Carolina, USA in the 1780s. It is named for the golden color of its unhulled grains.

== History ==
Rice was grown in South Carolina (in the South Carolina Lowcountry) by enslaved people, and led to enormous wealth. It was a staple of Lowcountry cuisine, and at the outset of the Civil War, 3.5 million of the 5 million bushels of rice produced in the United States were Carolina Gold rice. Over subsequent decades it declined in popularity until the last commercial crop was harvested in 1927.

In the 1980s, Dr. Richard and Patricia Schulze became interested in the variety while restoring rice ponds on their vacation property in Hardeeville, South Carolina. They found out that a USDA center on rice research in Texas had retained a stock of it in its seed bank. After obtaining and planting 14 pounds (6.4 kg), they harvested 64 pounds (29 kg) in the first season. By 1988, they were harvesting 10,000 pounds (4,500 kg) per year.

Two commercial efforts, Anson Mills and Carolina Plantation Rice, began selling the variety to the general public in 1998, after an effort at Clemson University had bred a disease-resistant strain. While Riviana Foods sells rice under the brand name Carolina Rice, including a parboiled variety called Carolina Gold, these share no connection to the variety of the name.

The Carolina Gold Rice Foundation was created in 2004 to help popularize, restore and preserve the heirloom rice. It has since expanded to other heirlooms such as French Huguenot black landrace buckwheat, Sea Island red peas, and others.

== See also ==
- Gullah people
- Gullah language
- Sea Island red pea
- Sea Island cotton
