= Small red beans =

Variety of the common bean (Phaseolus vulgaris)

Small Red Beans, Dry
Nutritional value per 100 g (3.5 oz)
- Energy: 956 kJ (228 kcal)
- Carbohydrates: 41.9 g
- Sugars: 2.8 g
- Dietary fiber: 4.1 g
- Fat: 1.28 g
- Protein: 23.5 g
Vitamins and minerals
Minerals	Quantity %DV^{†}
Calcium	11% 149 mg
Copper	108% 0.968 mg
Iron	28% 4.95 mg
Magnesium	40% 167 mg
Manganese	77% 1.76 mg
Phosphorus	39% 493 mg
Potassium	51% 1520 mg
Sodium	0% 5 mg
Zinc	29% 3.23 mg
- Link to USDA Database entry
- ^{†}Percentages estimated using US recommendations for adults, except for potassium, which is estimated based on expert recommendation from the National Academies.

Small red beans are a variety of the common bean (Phaseolus vulgaris), popular in Central America. They are also known as frijoles de seda (silk beans), "Mexican red beans," "Central American red beans," and "New Orleans red beans".

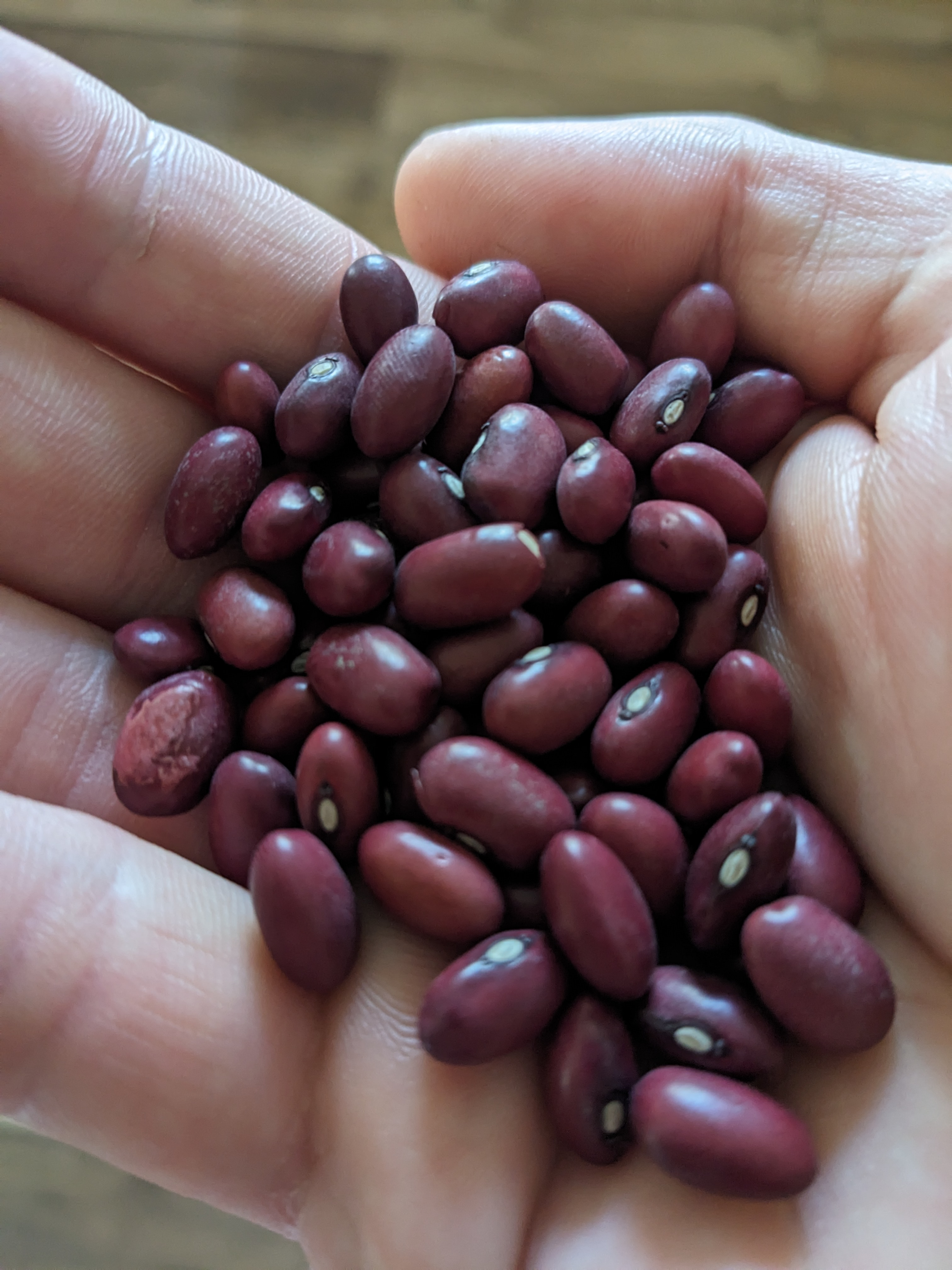
Small red beans

== Dishes ==
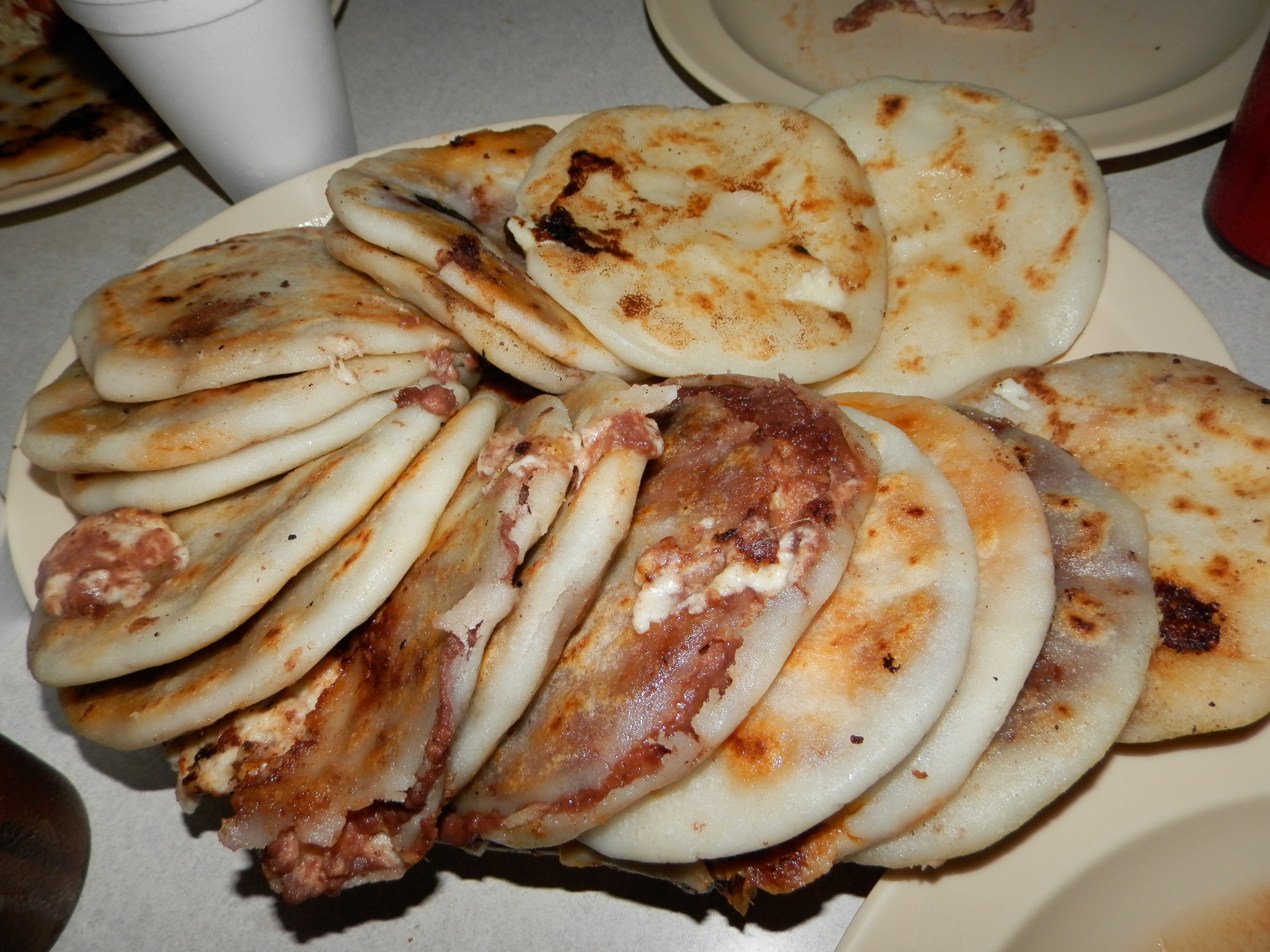
Pupusas, a popular dish in El Salvador

Small red beans are used mainly in Central America for a variety of dishes. They are the most commonly used bean in the country of El Salvador, often used in pupusas as well as refried beans (frijoles liquados).

== Toxicity ==
Small red beans contain some phytohemagglutinin and thus have some toxicity if not soaked and then boiled for at least 10 minutes. Cooking at the lower temperature of 80 °C (176 °F), such as in a slow cooker, is insufficient to denature the toxin and has been reported to cause food poisoning.
