= José Antonio Páez Municipality =

José Antonio Páez Municipality Municipio José Antonio Páez
- Municipality
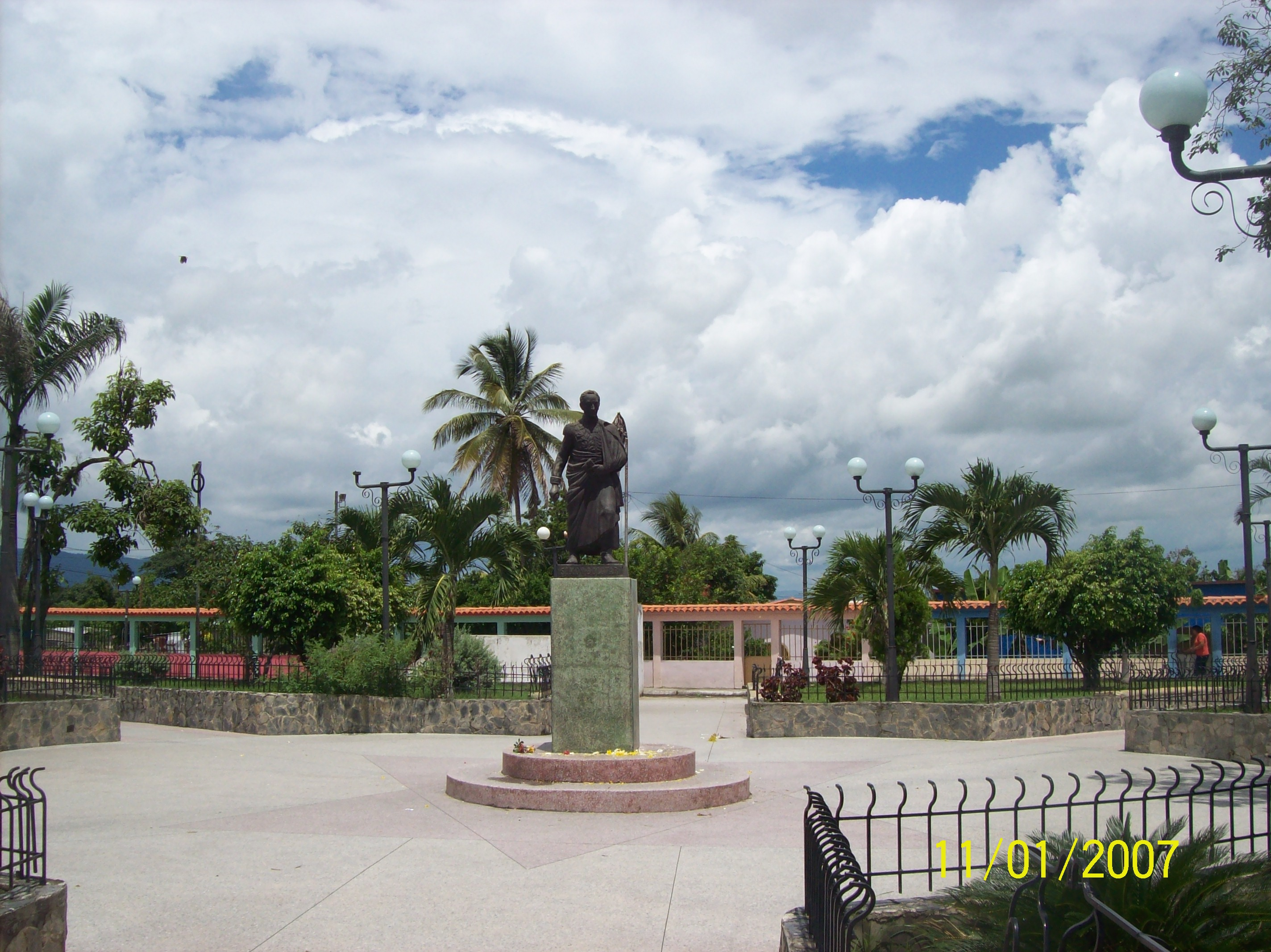

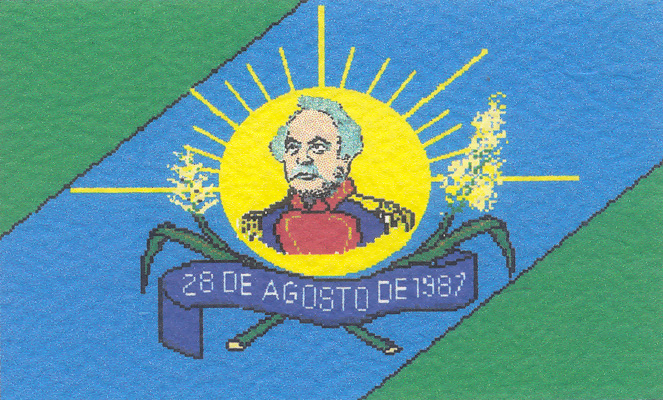
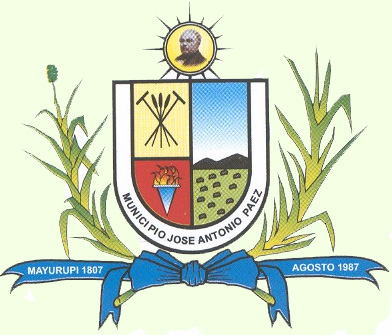
- Flag Coat of arms

- Location in Yaracuy

- Location in Venezuela
- Coordinates: 10°05′13″N 69°00′12″W
- Country: Venezuela
- State: Yaracuy
- Established: September 19, 1990
- Municipal seat: Sabana de Parra[*]

Area
  - Total: 109.0 km^{2} (42.1 sq mi)

Population (2011)
  - Total: 20,401
  - Density: 187.2/km^{2} (484.8/sq mi)
- Time zone: UTC−4 (VET)
- Website: Official website

José Antonio Páez is one of the 14 municipalities of the state of Yaracuy, Venezuela. The municipality is located in southwestern Yaracuy, occupying an area of 135 km² with a population of 20,401 inhabitants in 2011. The municipal seat is in Sabana de Parra. The municipality was named in honour of Venezuelan politician and military officer José Antonio Páez.

== Name ==
José Antonio Páez Municipality was named in honour of Venezuelan politician and military officer José Antonio Páez, who was the first president of the State of Venezuela.

== Demographics ==
Based on the 2011 Venezuelan census, The population of the José Antonio Páez Municipality was 20,401 people, accounting for 3.18% of the total population of the state of Yaracuy. A big majority of the population (84.81%) resides in Sabana de Parra, the municipal seat of the municipality.

By June 2019, official projections from the Venezuelan Statistics National Institute estimated the population of José Antonio Páez as 23,832 people, representing an annual growth rate of 2.0% since 2011 and showing a population density of 176.5 inhabitants/km². However, these projections do not account for the impact of emigration linked to the country's recent economic and political circumstances.

The gender distribution of the population showed an even balance with 9,956 men (50.6%) and 9,717 women (49.4%). The age distribution showed that the largest segment of the population was aged 15 to 64, comprising 64.5% of the people. Younger people aged 0 to 14 made up 30.9% of the population, while those aged 65 and older accounted for the remaining 4.6%. The municipality is highly urbanized, with 84.8% of the inhabitants (16,685) living in urban centers compared to 15.2% (2,988) in rural areas.

Ethnically, the municipality identified as predominantly Mestizo (56.8%) and White people (34.6%). Minority groups included 5.7% Afro-Venezuelans and 2.7% belonging to other ethnic groups, with 12 individuals identifying as indigenous. The literacy rate was 94%, with 948 inhabitants of José Antonio Páez not able to read or write.
