= Urachiche Municipality =

Municipality in Yaracuy, Venezuela

Urachiche Municipality Municipio Urachiche
- Municipality
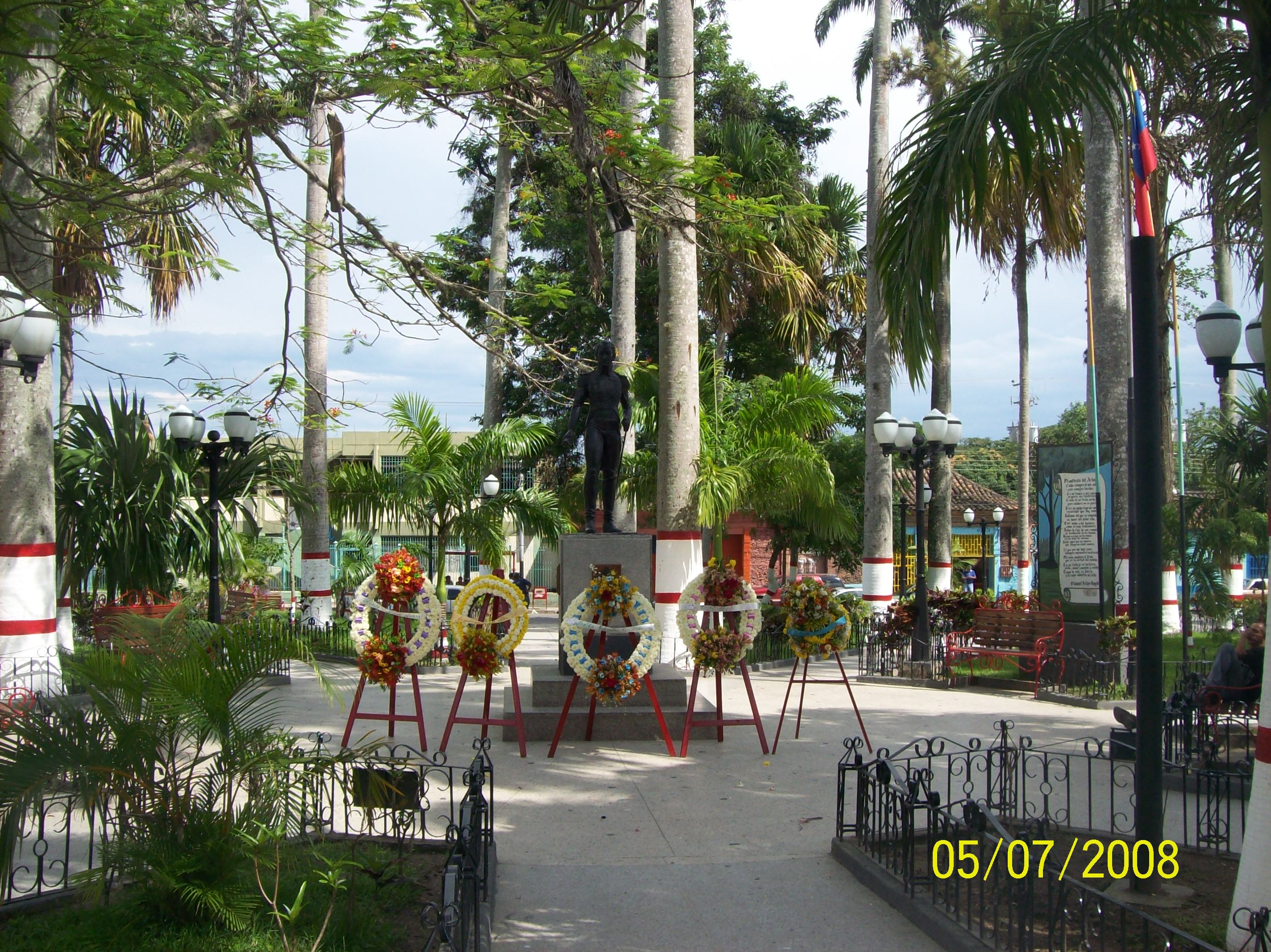

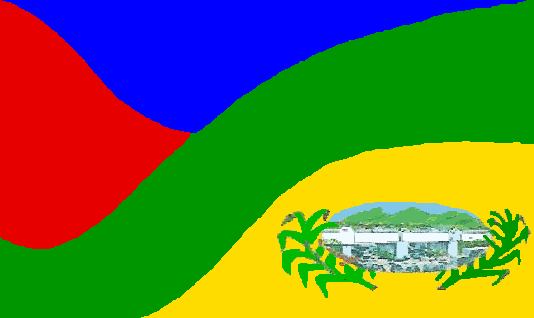
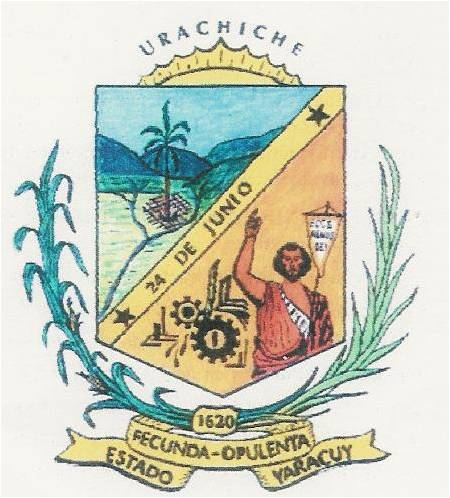
- Flag Seal

- Location in Yaracuy

- Location in Venezuela
- Coordinates: 10°10′55″N 69°00′18″W
- Country: Venezuela
- State: Yaracuy
- Municipal seat: Urachiche

Government
  - Mayor: Lisbed Parada (PSUV)

Area
  - Total: 170 km^{2} (66 sq mi)

Population (2011)
  - Total: 21,966
- Time zone: UTC−4 (VET)

Urachiche Municipality is one of the 14 municipalities of the state of Yaracuy, Venezuela. Its municipal seat is Urachiche. The municipality occupies an area of 170 km^{2} (66 sq mi) with a population of 22,715 inhabitants according to the 2011 census.

== Demographics ==
Based on the 2011 Venezuelan census, The population of the Urachiche Municipality was 21,966 people, accounting for 3.66% of the total population of the state of Yaracuy. A majority of the population (83.15%) resides in Urachiche, the municipal seat of the municipality.

By June 2019, official projections from the Venezuelan Statistics National Institute estimated the population of Peña as 26,308 people, representing an annual growth rate of 1.9% since 2011 and showing a population density of 154.8 inhabitants/km². However, these projections do not account for the impact of emigration linked to the country's recent economic and political circumstances.

The gender distribution of the population showed an even balance with 11,107 men (50.6%) and 10,859 women (49.4%). The age distribution showed that the largest segment of the population was aged 15 to 64, comprising 63.4% of the people. Younger people aged 0 to 14 made up 31.3% of the population, while those aged 65 and older accounted for the remaining 5.3%. The municipality is mostly urbanized, with 83.2% of the inhabitants (18,265) living in urban centers compared to 16.8% (3,701) in rural areas.

Ethnically, the municipality identified as predominantly Mestizo (59.9%) and White people (31.9%). Minority groups included 6.2% Afro-Venezuelans and 1.8% belonging to other ethnic groups, with 20 individuals identifying as indigenous. The literacy rate was 92.3%, with 1,353 inhabitants of Urachiche not able to read or write.
