= Independencia Municipality, Yaracuy =

Independencia Municipality Municipio Independencia
- Municipality
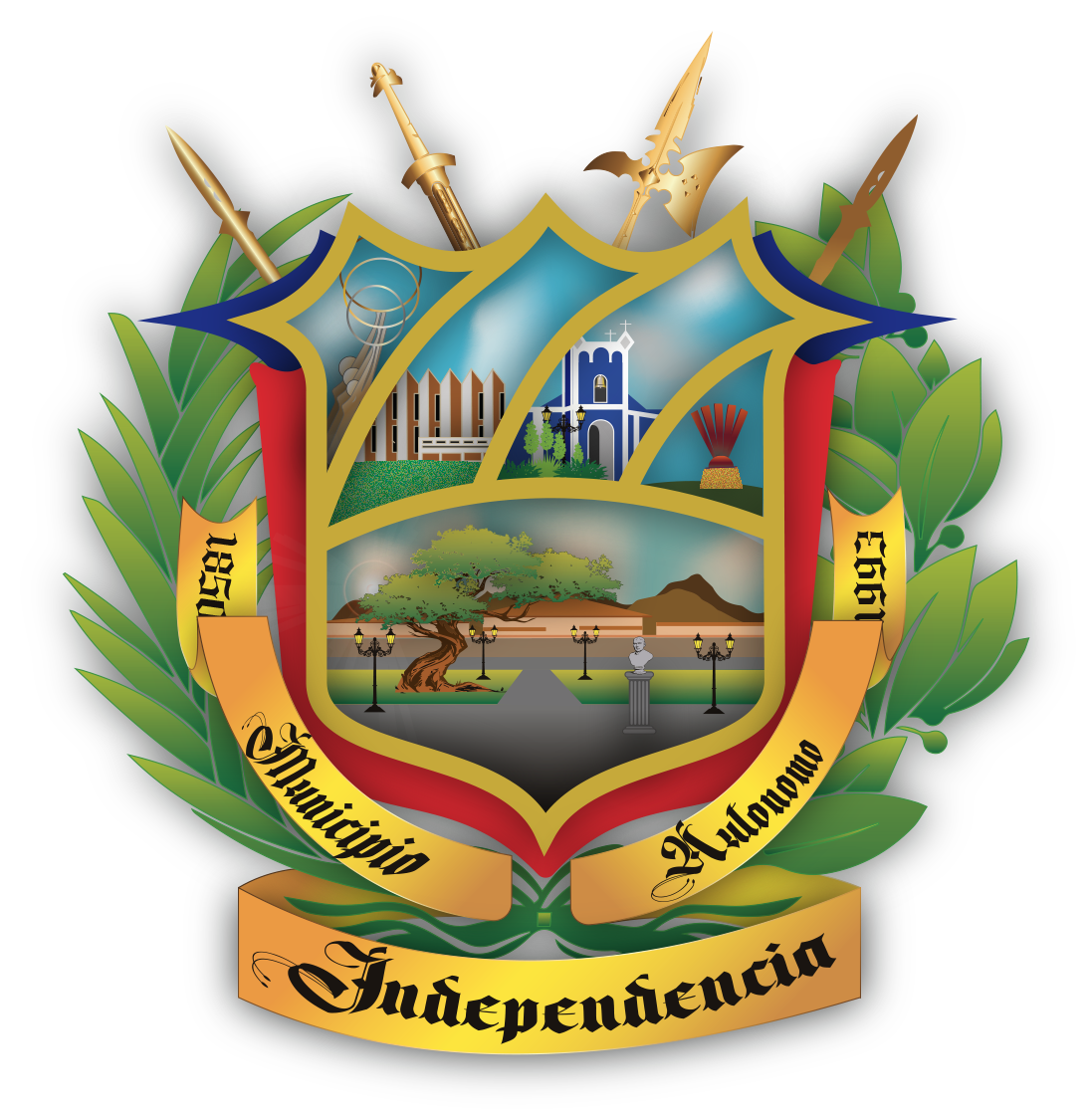
- Flag Coat of arms

- Location in Yaracuy

- Location in Venezuela
- Coordinates: 10°18′28″N 68°44′12″W
- Country: Venezuela
- State: Yaracuy

Area
  - Total: 61.6 km^{2} (23.8 sq mi)

Population (2011)
  - Total: 64,967
  - Density: 1,050/km^{2} (2,730/sq mi)
- Time zone: UTC−4 (VET)
- Website: Official website

Independencia is one of the 14 municipalities of the state of Yaracuy, Venezuela. The municipality is located in central Yaracuy, occupying an area of 98 km² with a population of 64,967 inhabitants, as of the 2011 census. The municipal seat is located in Independencia. The municipality contains historical and cultural heritage sites, such as the primary cemetery and the Santa Eduvigis Church.

== Demographics ==
Based on the 2011 Venezuelan census, The population of the Independencia Municipality was 64,967 people, accounting for 10.12% of the total population of the state of Yaracuy.

By June 2019, official projections from the Venezuelan Statistics National Institute estimated the population of Independencia as 74,657 people, representing an annual growth rate of 1.8% since 2011 and showing a population density of 761.8 inhabitants/km². However, these projections do not account for the impact of emigration linked to the country's recent economic and political circumstances.

The gender distribution of the population showed an even balance with 28,727 men (49.7%) and 29,084 women (50.3%). The age distribution showed that the largest segment of the population was aged 15 to 64, comprising 69% of the people. Younger people aged 0 to 14 made up 25.2% of the population, while those aged 65 and older accounted for the remaining 5.8%. The municipality is mostly urban, with 91.3% of the inhabitants (52,753) living in urban centers compared to 8.7% (5,058) in rural areas.

Ethnically, the municipality identified as predominantly Mestizo (56.7%) and White people (39.5%). Minority groups included 2.9% Afro-Venezuelans and 0.9% belonging to other ethnic groups, with 18 individuals identifying as indigenous. The literacy rate was 97%, with 1,460 inhabitants of Independencia not able to read or write.

== Culture ==
The primary cemetery at Independencia was named a historical and cultural heritage site in 2018 to have it be officially preserved by the state. Furthermore, in 2018, the Santa Eduvigis Church was officially declared a Historic-Cultural Patrimony of the municipality by the local Cultural Heritage Board following extensive research into its regional significance. Serving 47 local communities, it stands as one of the largest religious temples in the region, second only to the Cathedral of San Felipe.
