= San Felipe Municipality, Yaracuy =

San Felipe Municipality Municipio San Felipe
- Municipality
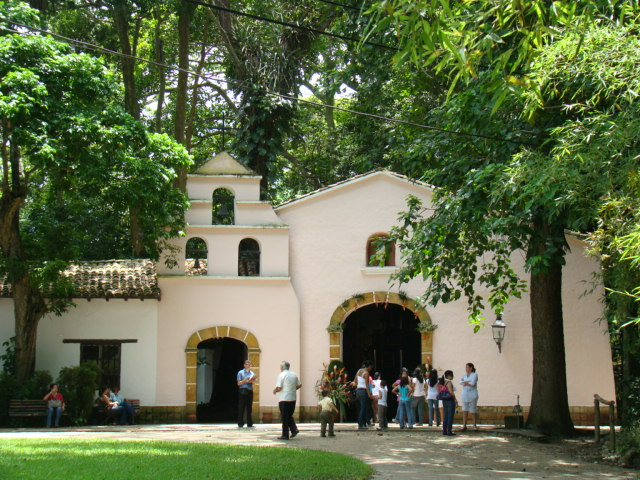

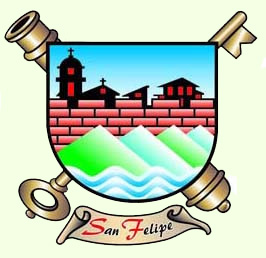
- Flag Seal

- Location in Yaracuy

- Location in Venezuela
- Coordinates: 10°22′18″N 68°41′15″W
- Country: Venezuela
- State: Yaracuy
- Municipal seat: San Felipe

Government
  - Mayor: Roger Daza (PSUV)

Area
  - Total: 472 km^{2} (182 sq mi)

Population (2011)
  - Total: 100,759
- Time zone: UTC−4 (VET)

San Felipe Municipality is one of the 14 municipalities of the state of Yaracuy, Venezuela. Its municipal seat is San Felipe, which is also the state capital. The municipality occupies an area of 472 km^{2} (182 sq mi) with a population of 100,759 inhabitants according to the 2011 census.

== Demographics ==
Based on the 2011 Venezuelan census, The population of the San Felipe Municipality was 100,759 people, accounting for 16.77% of the total population of the state of Yaracuy. A majority of the population (80.53%) resides in San Felipe, the municipal seat of the municipality.

By June 2019, official projections from the Venezuelan Statistics National Institute estimated the population of San Felipe as 128,056 people, representing an annual growth rate of 2.0% since 2011 and showing a population density of 271.3 inhabitants/km². However, these projections do not account for the impact of emigration linked to the country's recent economic and political circumstances.

The gender distribution of the population showed an even balance with 49,514 men (49.1%) and 51,245 women (50.9%). The age distribution showed that the largest segment of the population was aged 15 to 64, comprising 65.3% of the people. Younger people aged 0 to 14 made up 28.3% of the population, while those aged 65 and older accounted for the remaining 6.4%. The municipality is mostly urbanized, with 90.2% of the inhabitants (90,906) living in urban centers compared to 9.8% (9,853) in rural areas.

Ethnically, the municipality identified as predominantly Mestizo (57.5%) and White people (36.2%). Minority groups included 4.6% Afro-Venezuelans and 1.6% belonging to other ethnic groups, with 122 individuals identifying as indigenous. The literacy rate was 95.8%, with 3,408 inhabitants of San Felipe not able to read or write.
