= Nirgua Municipality =

Nirgua Municipality Municipio Nirgua
- Municipality

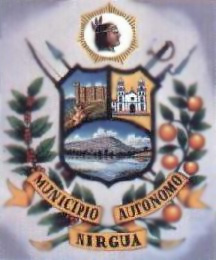
- Flag Seal

- Location in Yaracuy

- Location in Venezuela
- Coordinates: 10°5′00″N 68°40′00″W
- Country: Venezuela
- State: Yaracuy
- Established: October 2001
- Municipal seat: Nirgua

Government
  - Mayor: Miguel César (PSUV)

Area
  - Total: 2,274 km^{2} (878 sq mi)
- Elevation: 973 m (3,192 ft)

Population (2011 -> 2019 projection)
  - Total: 62,762 -> 70,270
  - Density: 30.9/km^{2} (80/sq mi)
- Time zone: UTC−4 (VET)
- Website: Official website

Nirgua Municipality is one of the 14 municipalities of the state of Yaracuy, Venezuela. Its municipal seat is Nirgua. The municipality occupies an area of 2,274 km^{2} (878 sq mi) with a population of 62,762 inhabitants according to the 2011 census.

== Demographics ==
Based on the 2011 Venezuelan census, The population of the Nirgua Municipality was 62,762 people, accounting for 9.78% of the total population of the state of Yaracuy. A majority of the population (60.1%) resides in Nirgua, the municipal seat of the municipality.

By June 2019, official projections from the Venezuelan Statistics National Institute estimated the population of Nirgua as 70,270 people, representing an annual growth rate of 1.4% since 2011 and showing a population density of 30.9 inhabitants/km². However, these projections do not account for the impact of emigration linked to the country's recent economic and political circumstances.

The gender distribution of the population showed an even balance with 30,460 men (51.7%) and 28,472 women (48.3%). The age distribution showed that the largest segment of the population was aged 15 to 64, comprising 65.9% of the people. Younger people aged 0 to 14 made up 27.4% of the population, while those aged 65 and older accounted for the remaining 6.6%. The municipality is mostly urbanized, with 70.3% of the inhabitants (41,432) living in urban centers compared to 29.7% (17,500) in rural areas.

Ethnically, the municipality identified as predominantly Mestizo (58.5%) and White people (37.2%). Minority groups included 3% Afro-Venezuelans and 1.1% belonging to other ethnic groups, with 72 individuals identifying as indigenous. The literacy rate was 91.1%, with 4,325 inhabitants of Nirgua not able to read or write.

== Government ==
Miguel César of the United Socialist Party of Venezuela (PSUV) party is currently the mayor of the Nirgua Municipality. He was first elected in 2002 as a member of the COPEI party. In 2013 he was elected mayor again, this time as part of the PSUV party. In July 2025, he was re-elected for a second consecutive term.
