= Peña Municipality =

Peña Municipality Municipio Peña
- Municipality

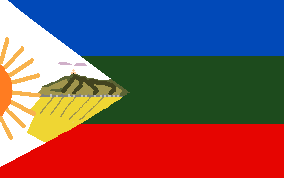
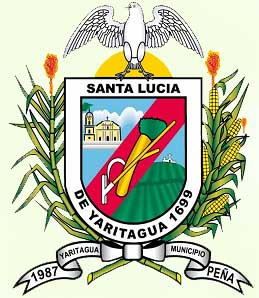
- Flag Seal

- Location in Yaracuy

- Location in Venezuela
- Coordinates: 10°02′56″N 69°05′51″W
- Country: Venezuela
- State: Yaracuy
- Municipal seat: Yaritagua

Government
  - Mayor: Giovanny Parra (PSUV)

Area
  - Total: 510 km^{2} (200 sq mi)

Population (2011)
  - Total: 101,620
- Time zone: UTC−4 (VET)

Peña Municipality is one of the 14 municipalities of the state of Yaracuy, Venezuela. Its municipal seat is Yaritagua. The municipality occupies an area of 510 km^{2} (200 sq mi) with a population of 101,620 inhabitants according to the 2011 census. The municipality was named after Venezuelan military officer José Vicente Peña.

== Demographics ==
Based on the 2011 Venezuelan census, The population of the Peña Municipality was 101,620 people, accounting for 16.91% of the total population of the state of Yaracuy. A majority of the population (80.4%) resides in Yaritagua, the municipal seat of the municipality.

By June 2019, official projections from the Venezuelan Statistics National Institute estimated the population of Peña as 124,643 people, representing an annual growth rate of 2.0% since 2011 and showing a population density of 244.4 inhabitants/km². However, these projections do not account for the impact of emigration linked to the country's recent economic and political circumstances.

The gender distribution of the population showed an even balance with 51,122 men (50.3%) and 50,498 women (49.7%). The age distribution showed that the largest segment of the population was aged 15 to 64, comprising 65.3% of the people. Younger people aged 0 to 14 made up 29.6% of the population, while those aged 65 and older accounted for the remaining 5.1%. The municipality is mostly urbanized, with 86.2% of the inhabitants (87,577) living in urban centers compared to 13.8% (14,043) in rural areas.

Ethnically, the municipality identified as predominantly Mestizo (52.9%) and White people (37.2%). Minority groups included 3.9% Afro-Venezuelans and 1% belonging to other ethnic groups, with 65 individuals identifying as indigenous. The literacy rate was 94.3%, with 4,681 inhabitants of Peña not able to read or write.
