= Ángel Sauce =

Background information
- Born: August 2, 1911; Caracas, Federal District, Venezuela
- Died: December 26, 1995 (aged 84) Caracas, Federal District, Venezuela
- Genre: Classical
- Occupations: Musician, composer, violinist and conductor
- Instrument: Violin
- Formerly of: Venezuela Symphony Orchestra

Ángel Sauce (born in Caracas, Federal District on August 2, 1911; died Ibid. on December 26, 1995) was a Venezuelan composer, violinist and conductor. He was founder of multiple choirs and orchestras, and for more than twelve years he directed the Venezuela Symphony Orchestra. He received two National Music Prizes in Venezuela, one in 1948 for his composition Cecilia Mujica and one in 1982 for general achievements in his lengthy career.

== See also ==
- Venezuela
- Venezuelan music
