= Yaritagua =

- City
- Yaritagua
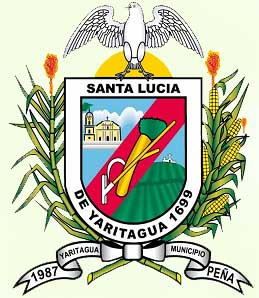
- Coat of arms

- Location within Venezuela
- Coordinates: 10°4′31″N 69°7′42″W
- Country: Venezuela
- State: Yaracuy
- Municipality: Peña Municipality
- Established: 19 November 1699

Government
  - Mayor: Gustavo Roz (PT)

Area
  - Total: 510 km^{2} (200 sq mi)
- Elevation: 340 m (1,120 ft)

Population
  - Total: 120,000
  - Demonym: Yaritagüeño/a
- Time zone: UTC−4 (VET)
- Postal code: 3203
- Climate: Aw
- Website: yaritagua.com.ve

Yaritagua (Spanish pronunciation: [ʝaɾiˈtaɣwa]) is the capital of the Peña Municipality of Venezuela's state of Yaracuy. It has a population of around 120,000, and is considered Yaracuy's second city, after the state capital San Felipe.

Founded in 1699 during Spain's colonization of Venezuela by Nicolas Eugenio de Ponte, the city retains some colonial-era buildings. The significance of sugar cane in the area has given it the nickname Ciudad Dulce de Yaracuy (Sweet City of Yaracuy).

The city is twinned with Zamora, Spain.

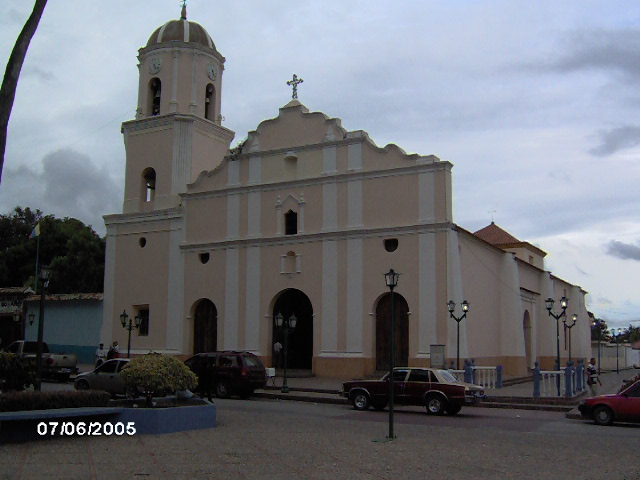
Santa Lucía church in the city center
