= Yurubí National Park =

National park in the north of Venezuela

Yurubí National Park Parque Nacional Yurubí
- IUCN category II (national park)
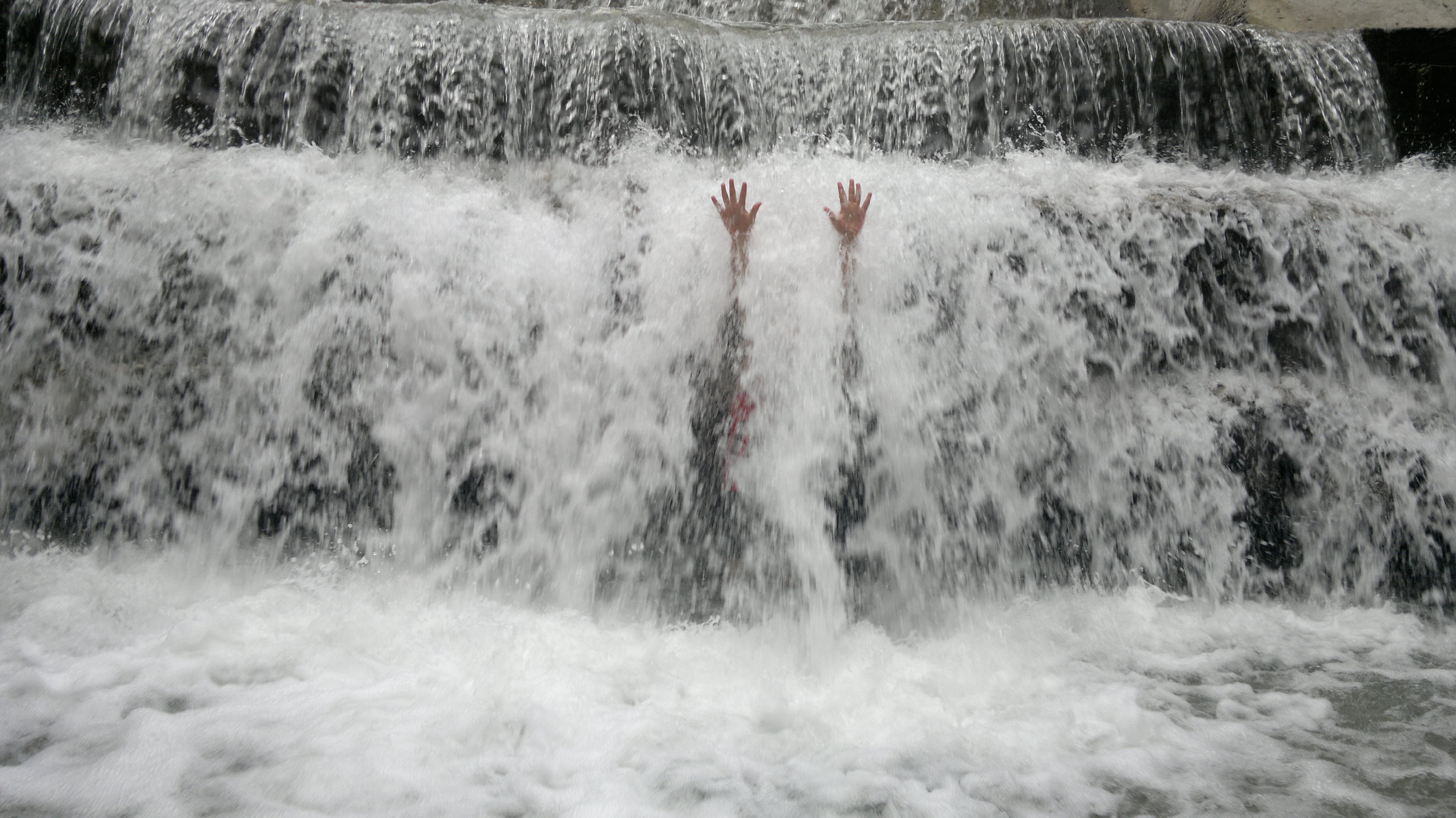

- Location within Venezuela
- Location: Venezuela
- Coordinates: 10°28′N 68°39′W
- Area: 236.7 km^{2} (91.4 sq mi)
- Established: March 18, 1960

The Yurubí National Park (Spanish: Parque nacional Yurubí) is a protected area with the status of national park in the north of the South American country of Venezuela. It was founded on March 18, 1960 in Yaracuy State created to protect the Yurubí river basin, which is the source of fresh water for the city of San Felipe. The Yurubí National Park is located in the mountains of the Sierra de Aroa. The park includes cloud forests and low montane forests and is surrounded by cultivated areas. The park is crossed by small trails, which are used mainly by poachers or by a small number of visitors and researchers. The park is not inhabited; The former settlers of the area were relocated many years ago.

Due to its geographical location, the Yurubí National Park is expected to have a high degree of biodiversity and endemism, however, only limited research has been done and information is limited. 68 species of birds have been reported, 64 species of bats, 13 carnivores, 9 rodents, 5 marsupials, 2 primates, among other mammals within the park.

== See also ==
- List of national parks of Venezuela
- Los Roques National Park

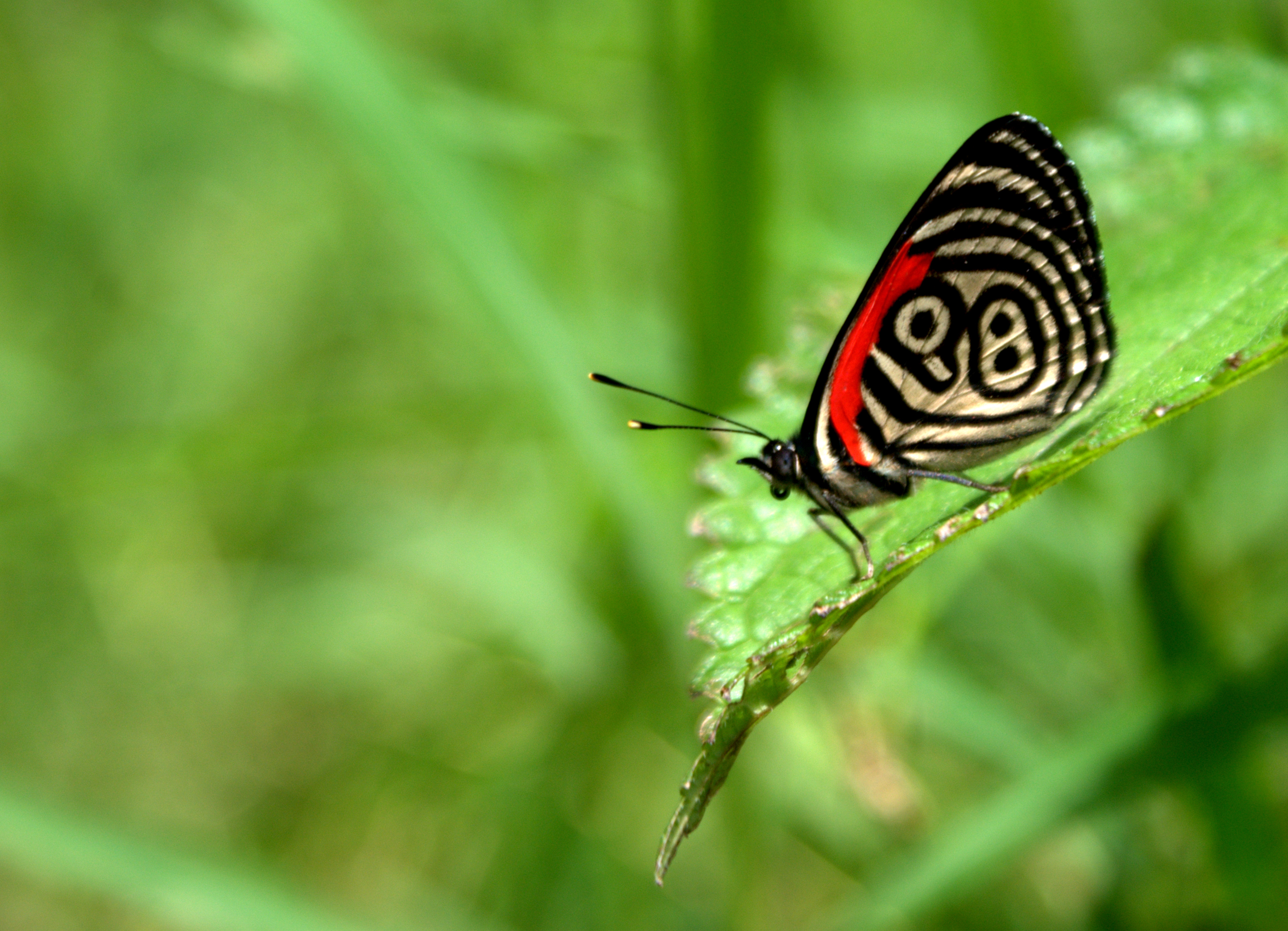
Butterfly in the park
