= List of Venezuela state constitutions =

This is a list of the state-level constitutions of Venezuela.

The State Constitutions of Venezuela are the fundamental charters of the federal entities of Venezuela, which were approved by each of their respective regional parliaments (called the Legislative Councils of Venezuela) in accordance with the guidelines on State Public Power established in Chapter III (Articles 159–167) of Title IV of the 1999 Constitution of the Republic.

== List ==
State	Flag	Constitution	Adopted	Map
Amazonas		Constitution of Amazonas	2002	
Anzoátegui		Constitution of Anzoátegui	2002	
Apure		Constitution of Apure	2002	
Aragua		Constitution of Aragua	2002	
Barinas		Constitution of Barinas	2004	
Bolívar		Constitution of Bolívar	2001	
Carabobo		Constitution of Carabobo	1991	
Cojedes		Constitution of Cojedes		
Delta Amacuro		Constitution of Delta Amacuro		
Federal Dependencies		As it is administered by federal law, it does not have a constitution		
Capital District (Caracas)		As it is administered by federal law, it does not have a constitution		
Falcón		Constitution of Falcón	2004	
Guárico		Constitution of Guárico	2006	
Lara		Constitution of Lara		
Mérida		Constitution of Mérida	1995	
Miranda		Constitution of Bolivariano de Miranda	2006	
Monagas		Constitution of Monagas	2002	
Nueva Esparta		Constitution of Nueva Esparta	2000	
Portuguesa		Constitution of Portuguesa	2002	
Sucre		Constitution of Sucre	2001	
Táchira		Constitution of Táchira	2001	
Trujillo		Constitution of Trujillo		
Vargas		Constitution of Vargas	2001	
Yaracuy		Constitution of Yaracuy	2002	
Zulia		Constitution of Zulia	2003	
