= La Trinidad Municipality =

Municipality in Yaracuy, Venezuela

La Trinidad Municipality Municipio La Trinidad
- Municipality
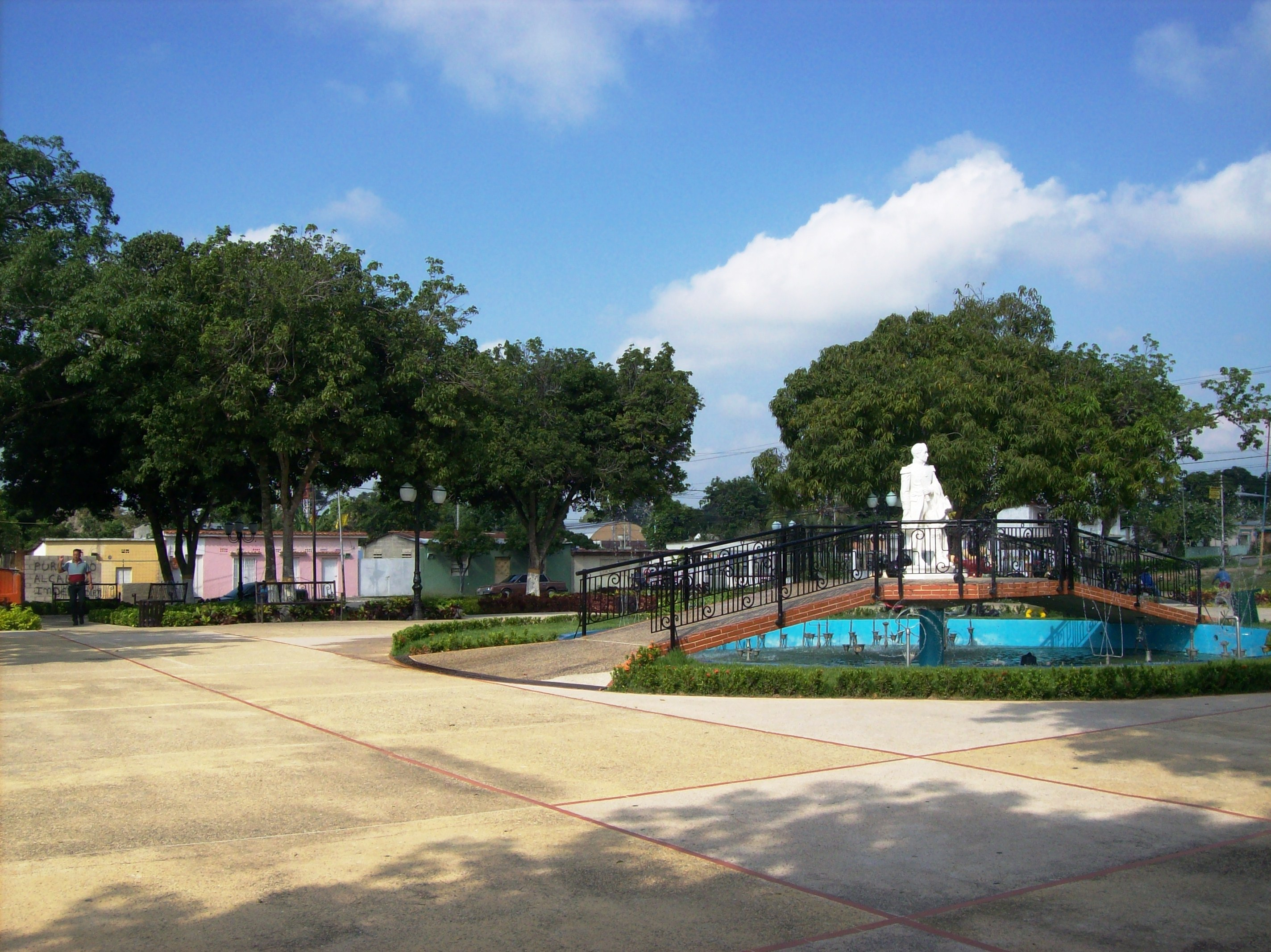

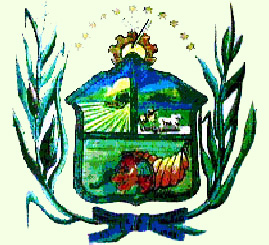
- Flag Seal

- Location in Yaracuy

- Location in Venezuela
- Coordinates: 10°13′41″N 68°44′56″W
- Country: Venezuela
- State: Yaracuy
- Founded: 1993

Government
  - Mayor: Ronald Ortega Uztaris (PSUV)

Area
  - Total: 64.8 km^{2} (25.0 sq mi)

Population (2011)
  - Total: 18,825
  - Density: 291/km^{2} (752/sq mi)
- Time zone: UTC−4 (VET)
- Website: Official website

La Trinidad is one of the 14 municipalities of the state of Yaracuy, Venezuela. The municipality is located in central Yaracuy, occupying an area of 62 square kilometres (24 sq mi) with a population of 18,825 inhabitants, as of the 2011 census. The municipal seat is located in Boraure.
