= Nirgua =

Nirgua Municipio Nirgua
- City
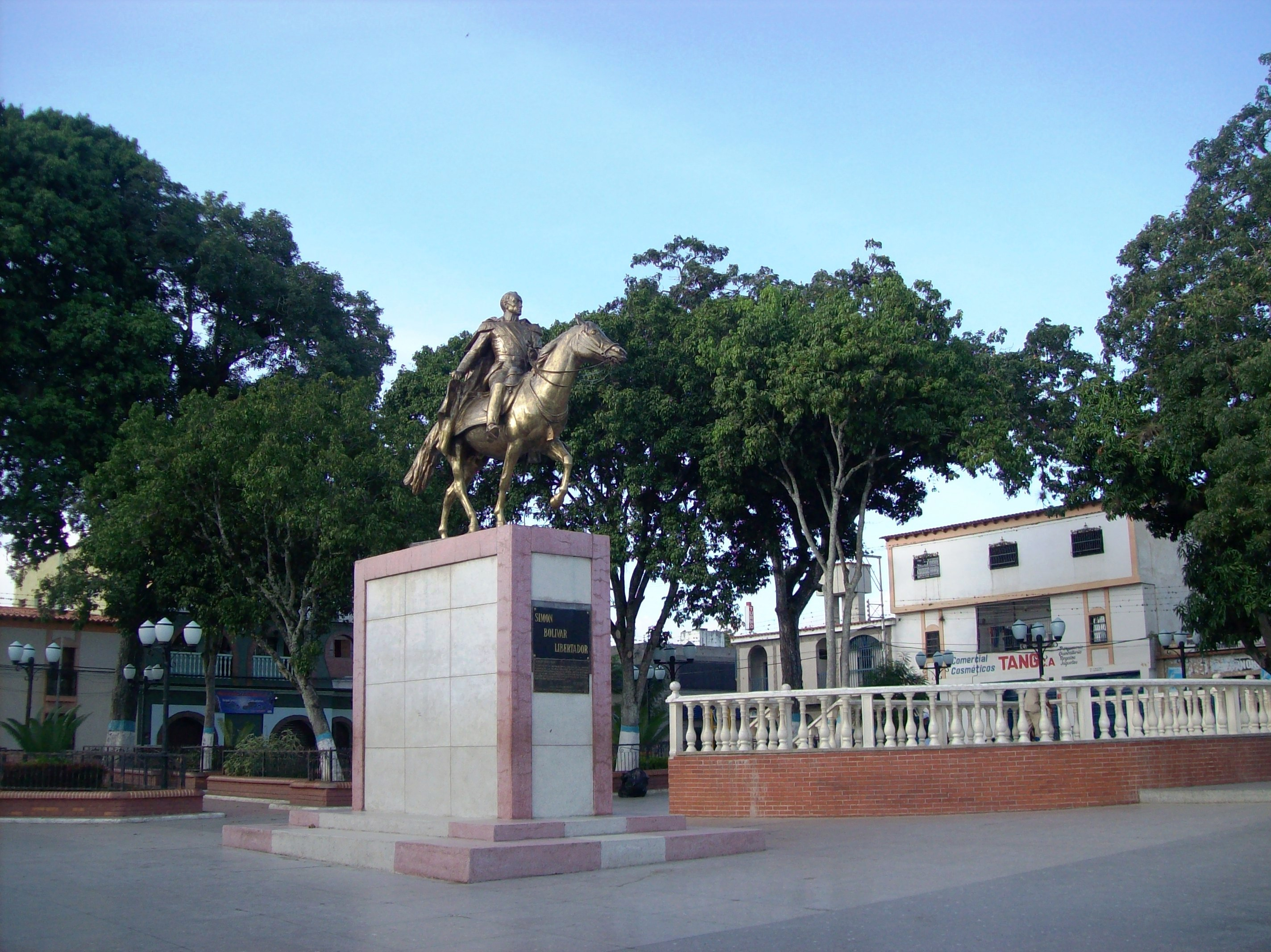
- Plaza Bolívar de Nirgua

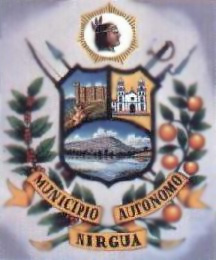
- Flag Coat of arms

- Location in Venezuela
- Coordinates: 10°09′09″N 68°33′59″W
- Country: Venezuela
- State: Yaracuy
- Municipality: Nirgua
- Founded: January 25, 1625

Government
  - Mayor: Miguel César (PSUV)

Area
  - Total: 2,274 km^{2} (878 sq mi)
- Elevation: 807 m (2,648 ft)

Population (2011)
  - Total: 35,407
  - Density: 15.57/km^{2} (40.33/sq mi)
- Time zone: UTC−4 (VET)
- Postal code(s): 3201
- Area code(s): 254
- Website: Official website

Nirgua is a city and the seat of the Nirgua Municipality in the state of Yaracuy, Venezuela.

== History ==
The city was founded on January 25, 1625, by Don Juan de Meneses.

== Notable people ==
- Orluis Aular (born 1996), professional cyclist
- Roniel Campos (born 1993), professional cyclist
- Henri Falcón (born 1961), Venezuelan politician
- Yoendrys Gómez (born 1999), Major League Baseball pitcher
- Humberto Rivas Mijares (1918–1981), journalist and diplomat
- Carlos José Ochoa (born 1980), professional cyclist
- Leonel Quintero (born 1997), professional cyclist
