= Cecilia Mujica =

Venezuelan heroine

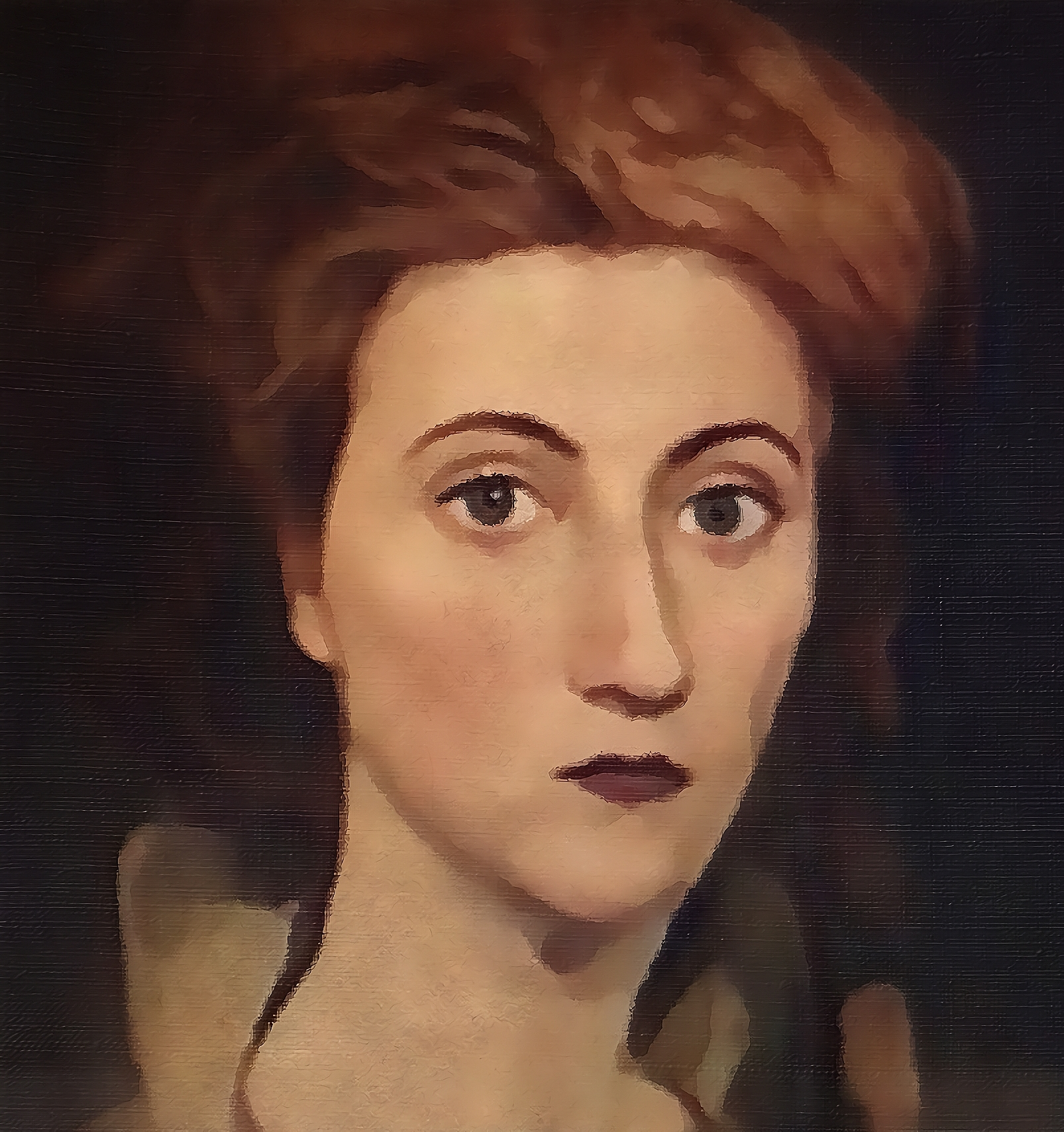
Cecilia Mujica

Cecilia Mujica (died 1813), nicknamed The Martyr of Freedom, is a Venezuelan heroine noted for her support for the country's independence and her work with the independence forces. She was known as a propagandist. Born in San Felipe, she was the daughter of the royalist Martín de Mujica, who was killed in the devastating earthquake of 1812. In 1811, she became engaged to Enrique de Villadonga.

She was executed by firing squad by royalist forces in 1813 in Los Zunzunes, Yaracuy during the Venezuelan War of Independence.
