= Sucre Municipality, Yaracuy =

Municipality in Yaracuy, Venezuela

Sucre Municipality Municipio Sucre
- Municipality

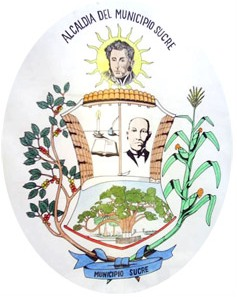
- Flag Seal

- Location in Yaracuy

- Location in Venezuela
- Coordinates: 10°16′14″N 68°49′22″W
- Country: Venezuela
- State: Yaracuy
- Founded: 1995

Government
  - Mayor: Luis Adrián Duque (PSUV)

Area
  - Total: 92.2 km^{2} (35.6 sq mi)

Population (2011)
  - Total: 19,777
  - Density: 215/km^{2} (556/sq mi)
- Time zone: UTC−4 (VET)
- Website: Official website

Sucre is one of the 14 municipalities of the state of Yaracuy, Venezuela. The municipality is located in central Yaracuy, occupying an area of 133 square kilometres (51 sq mi) with a population of 19,777 inhabitants, as of the 2011 census. The municipal seat is located in Guama.
