= San Felipe, Venezuela =

San Felipe, Yaracuy
- Capital city
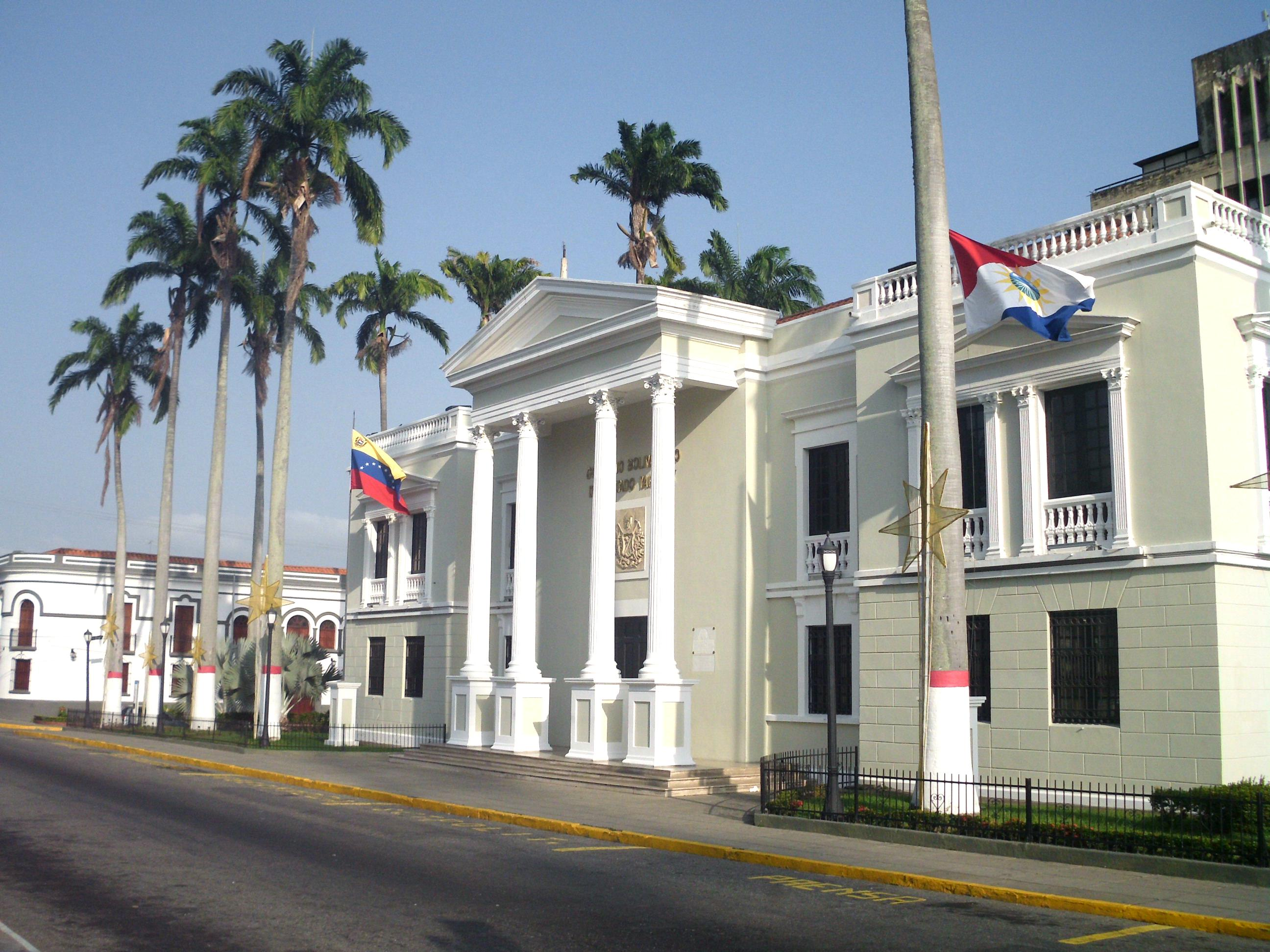
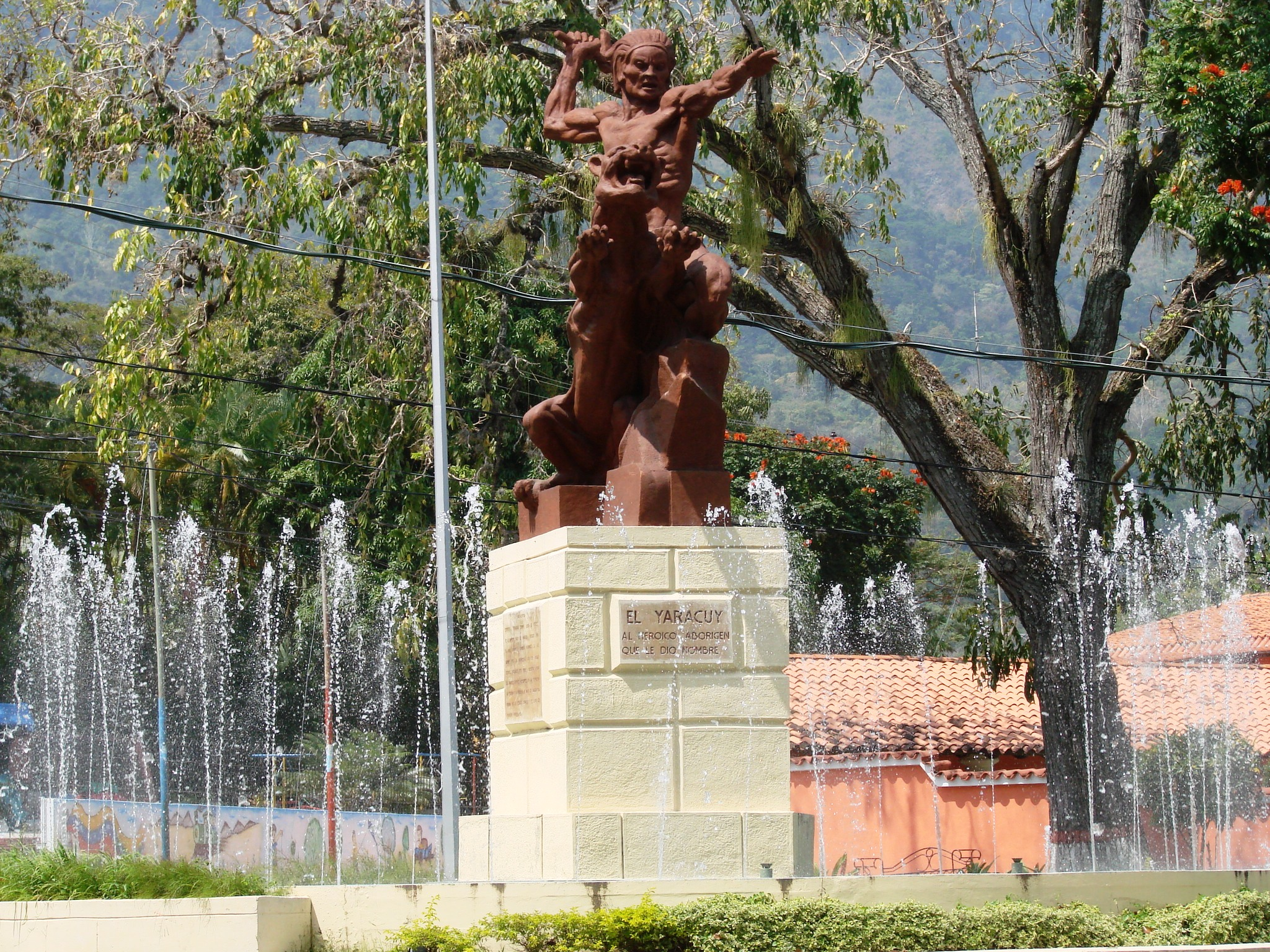
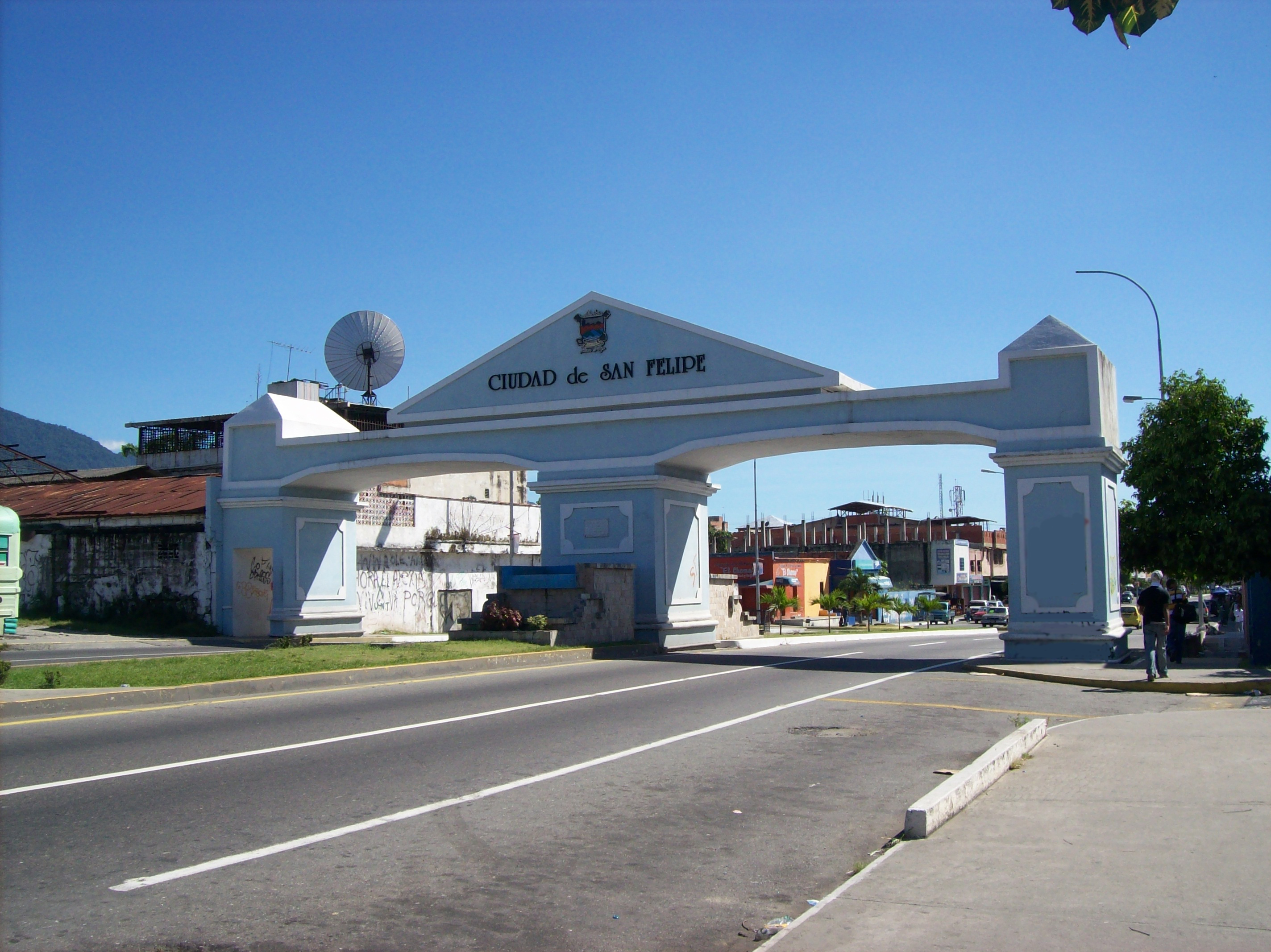
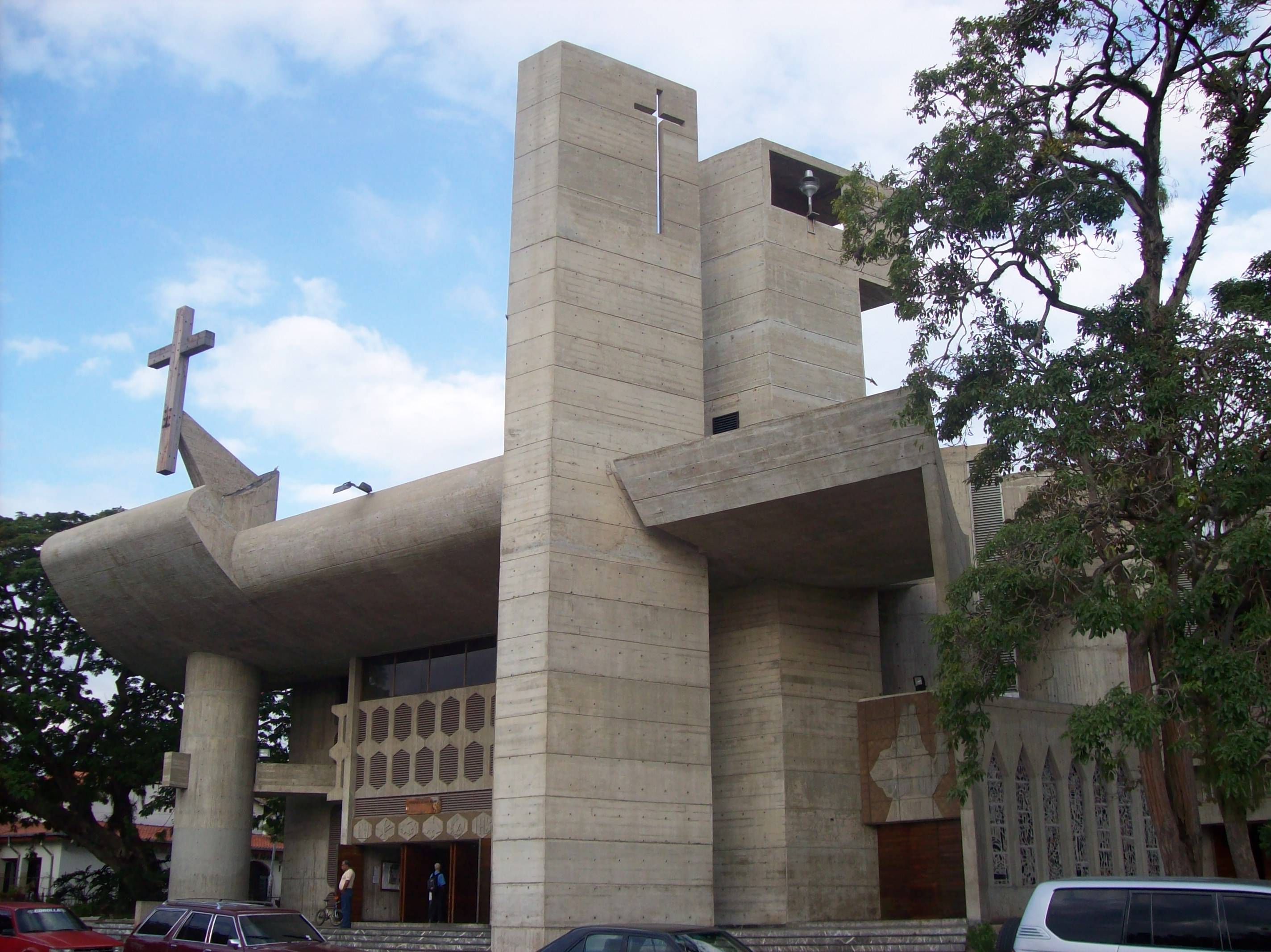
- Top:Yaracuy States Government Office, Second:Indo Yaracuy Monument in El Ferte Park, Fair Arch of San Felipe, (left to right) Bottom:St. Philip the Apostle Cathedral, San Felipe

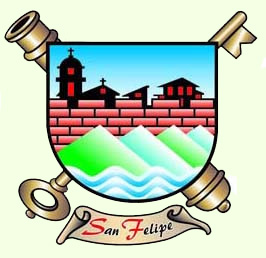
- Coat of arms

- Location within Venezuela
- Coordinates: 10°20′26″N 68°44′13″W
- Country: Venezuela
- State: Yaracuy
- Municipality: San Felipe
- Founded: 6 November 1729

Government
  - Mayor: Julio León Heredia (PSUV)

Area
  - Total: 472 km^{2} (182 sq mi)
- Elevation: 800 m (2,600 ft)

Population (2019)
  - Total: 174,300
  - Density: 369/km^{2} (956/sq mi)
  - Demonym: Sanfelipean; Sanfelipeño -ña (es)
- Time zone: UTC−4 (VET)
- Postal code: 3201
- Area code: 0254
- Climate: Aw
- Website: Alcaldía de San Felipe (in Spanish)
- Population is metropolitan area. City itself: 103.121.

San Felipe (Spanish pronunciation: [saɱ feˈlipe]) is the capital city of Yaracuy, Venezuela. San Felipe is located in the Central-Western Region, Venezuela. The city is an important urban, industrial, commercial and transportation center of Venezuela. San Felipe is the seat of the Roman Catholic Diocese of San Felipe, Venezuela.

== History ==
In 1693, Spanish settlement began in the area that is now San Felipe with the foundation of the town of Cerrito de Cocorote. Like all towns in the region at the time, Cerrito de Cocorote was under the jurisdiction of the city of Nueva Segovia de Barquisimeto. In 1710, the town was destroyed on orders from the authorities of Nueva Segovia de Barquisimeto. Despite this, the town was rebuilt within several years, causing the Captain General to again order its destruction. In 1721, the town's inhabitants returned to rebuild it after receiving the authority to do so. Despite this, the authorities of Nueva Segovia de Barquisimeto set fire to the town, destroying it for the third time.

Despite the destruction of their town, the former inhabitants of Cerrito de Cocorote still wished to be independent of Nueva Segovia de Barquisimeto. They received the support of Fray Marcelino de San Vicente, who helped them obtain a Royal Certificate from King Philip V of Spain to establish a town independent from Nueva Segovia de Barquisimeto. On November 6, 1729, the same day the villagers had received the Royal Certificate, they began the reconstruction of their town in the Valle Hondo region, naming it San Felipe El Fuerte in homage to Philip V of Spain. The city expanded in subsequent years, until it was destroyed by the 1812 Caracas earthquake on March 26, 1812. After the earthquake, the town's remaining inhabitants again rebuilt it.

== Geography ==
San Felipe is located in the foothills of Cerro Chimborazo, in Bolívar, Yaracuy. The city is located on a hill, with its avenues being on steep slopes, with its streets being less inclined. In the upper part of the city is the José Antonio Anzoátegui Mechanized Infantry Battalion and the Central Hospital Dr. Plácido Daniel Rodríguez Rivero, while in the lower part of it are the neighborhoods of San Antonio, San José, and Higuerón. The city is cooled by the Yurubí River, which flows downwards from a narrow valley located north of the city. The river subsequently joins the Yaracuy River, which flows to the Caribbean Basin. The city is near the Yurubí National Park, a forest of deciduous and semi-deciduous trees. A nearby lake is used as San Felipe's source of freshwater.

=== Climate ===
In San Felipe, a hot semi-arid climate (Köppen BSh) is dominant. The city records 550 millimetres or 21.7 inches of rain per year and its average temperature ranges 25 °C (77 °F).

Climate data for San Felipe, Venezuela
Month	Jan	Feb	Mar	Apr	May	Jun	Jul	Aug	Sep	Oct	Nov	Dec	Year
Record high °C (°F)	33.9 (93.0)	35.4 (95.7)	37.5 (99.5)	35.6 (96.1)	35.6 (96.1)	34.0 (93.2)	32.8 (91.0)	33.8 (92.8)	34.0 (93.2)	34.1 (93.4)	33.6 (92.5)	32.8 (91.0)	37.5 (99.5)
Mean daily maximum °C (°F)	29.5 (85.1)	30.3 (86.5)	31.1 (88.0)	30.4 (86.7)	29.6 (85.3)	28.9 (84.0)	28.8 (83.8)	29.7 (85.5)	30.2 (86.4)	30.2 (86.4)	29.8 (85.6)	29.1 (84.4)	29.8 (85.6)
Daily mean °C (°F)	24.1 (75.4)	24.7 (76.5)	25.4 (77.7)	25.5 (77.9)	25.1 (77.2)	24.6 (76.3)	24.3 (75.7)	24.8 (76.6)	25.2 (77.4)	25.2 (77.4)	24.9 (76.8)	24.1 (75.4)	24.8 (76.6)
Mean daily minimum °C (°F)	18.6 (65.5)	19.0 (66.2)	19.6 (67.3)	20.6 (69.1)	20.6 (69.1)	20.2 (68.4)	19.8 (67.6)	19.9 (67.8)	20.1 (68.2)	20.2 (68.4)	20.0 (68.0)	19.1 (66.4)	19.8 (67.6)
Record low °C (°F)	13.4 (56.1)	13.2 (55.8)	12.6 (54.7)	15.2 (59.4)	16.5 (61.7)	16.1 (61.0)	16.4 (61.5)	15.4 (59.7)	15.4 (59.7)	15.1 (59.2)	15.0 (59.0)	13.8 (56.8)	12.6 (54.7)
Average rainfall mm (inches)	9 (0.4)	8 (0.3)	14 (0.6)	65 (2.6)	75 (3.0)	78 (3.1)	77 (3.0)	53 (2.1)	39 (1.5)	49 (1.9)	48 (1.9)	25 (1.0)	540 (21.3)
Average rainy days (≥ 1.0 mm)	1.5	1.2	1.7	5.5	7.9	12.0	10.6	8.1	5.8	6.1	6.4	4.0	70.8
Average relative humidity (%)	68.5	66.5	65.5	70.0	74.0	75.0	74.5	73.0	72.5	73.0	73.0	72.0	71.5
Mean monthly sunshine hours	260.4	235.2	241.8	183.0	192.2	201.0	232.5	241.8	228.0	226.3	222.0	248.0	2,712.2
Source 1: Instituto Nacional de Meteorología e Hidrología (INAMEH)
Source 2: NOAA (extremes, precipitation, and sun)

== Transport ==
The town is/was served by a station on the national railway network. Sub Teniente Nestor Arias Airport is 5 kilometres (3.1 mi) south of the town.

== Notable people ==
- Rafael Caldera, former president of Venezuela.
- Astrid Carolina Herrera, Miss World 1984.
- Cecilia Mujica, heroine.
- Marco Scutaro, former professional baseball player.
- Luis Arráez, professional baseball player for the Philadelphia Phillies.
- Milagros Sequera, former professional female tennis player.
- Rafael Dudamel, football manager.
- Carlos Suárez Mendoza, footballer who plays as a midfielder for Deportes Melipilla.
- Heber García, football player who plays as midfielder for Curicó Unido in Chilean Primera División.
- Felipe Vázquez, professional baseball pitcher.
- Goizeder Azúa, Miss International 2003.
- Gabriela de la Cruz, Miss Supranational Venezuela 2019.
- Migleth Cuevas, professional model
- Henri Falcón, politician.
- Eduardo Lapi, politician.
- Yolanda Tortolero, politician.
- Luis Lara, professional baseball player.

== See also ==
- Railway stations in Venezuela
