= Yaracuy =

Yaracuy State
- State
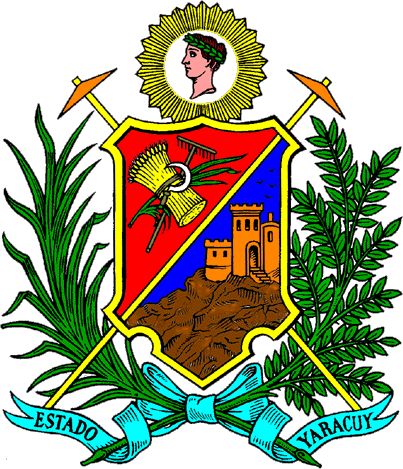
- Flag Coat of arms
- Anthem: Himno del Estado Yaracuy
- Location within Venezuela
- Coordinates: 10.31°N 68.71°W
- Country: Venezuela
- Created: 1909
- Capital: San Felipe

Government
  - Body: Legislative Council
  - Governor: Leonardo Intoci

Area
  - Total: 7,100 km^{2} (2,700 sq mi)
  - Rank: 19th
- 0.77% of Venezuela

Population (2011 census)
  - Total: 690,852
  - Rank: 18th
- 2.16% of Venezuela
- Time zone: UTC−4 (VET)
- ISO 3166 code: VE-U
- Emblematic tree: Chaguaramo (Roystonea oleracea)
- HDI (2019): 0.677 medium · 20th of 24
- Website: www.yaracuy.gob.ve

Yaracuy (Spanish: Estado Yaracuy, IPA: [esˈtaðo ʝaɾaˈkuj];) is one of the 23 states of Venezuela. Yaracuy is located in the Central-Western Region, Venezuela. It is bordered by Falcón in the north, in the west by Lara, in the south by Portuguesa and Cojedes and in the east by Cojedes and Carabobo.

The geography of state is mountainous, the Andes range ends there, and the Coastal Range begins. It is split by two mountainous systems, the Sierra de Aroa on the North and the Sierra de Nirgua. In between lies the agricultural land drained by the Yaracuy River. Most cities and towns are in this valley, including the capital city.

The Cerro María Lionza Natural Monument is located in Chivacoa. Yaracuy is known as the Louisiana of Venezuela, due to the practices of witchcraft, occultism and the practice of religions such as voodoo, very similar to Louisiana Voodoo.

The economy of Yaracuy is mostly agricultural. Some manufacturing can be found in Yaritagua area and Chivacoa, usually in agribusiness.

== History ==
The written history of Yaracuy begins in the year 1530, with the passage of the German Nicolás Federman, Lieutenant of Governor Welser of Augsburg. In his travel report through the Belzaresque jurisdiction, he qualifies it as Valle de las Damas.

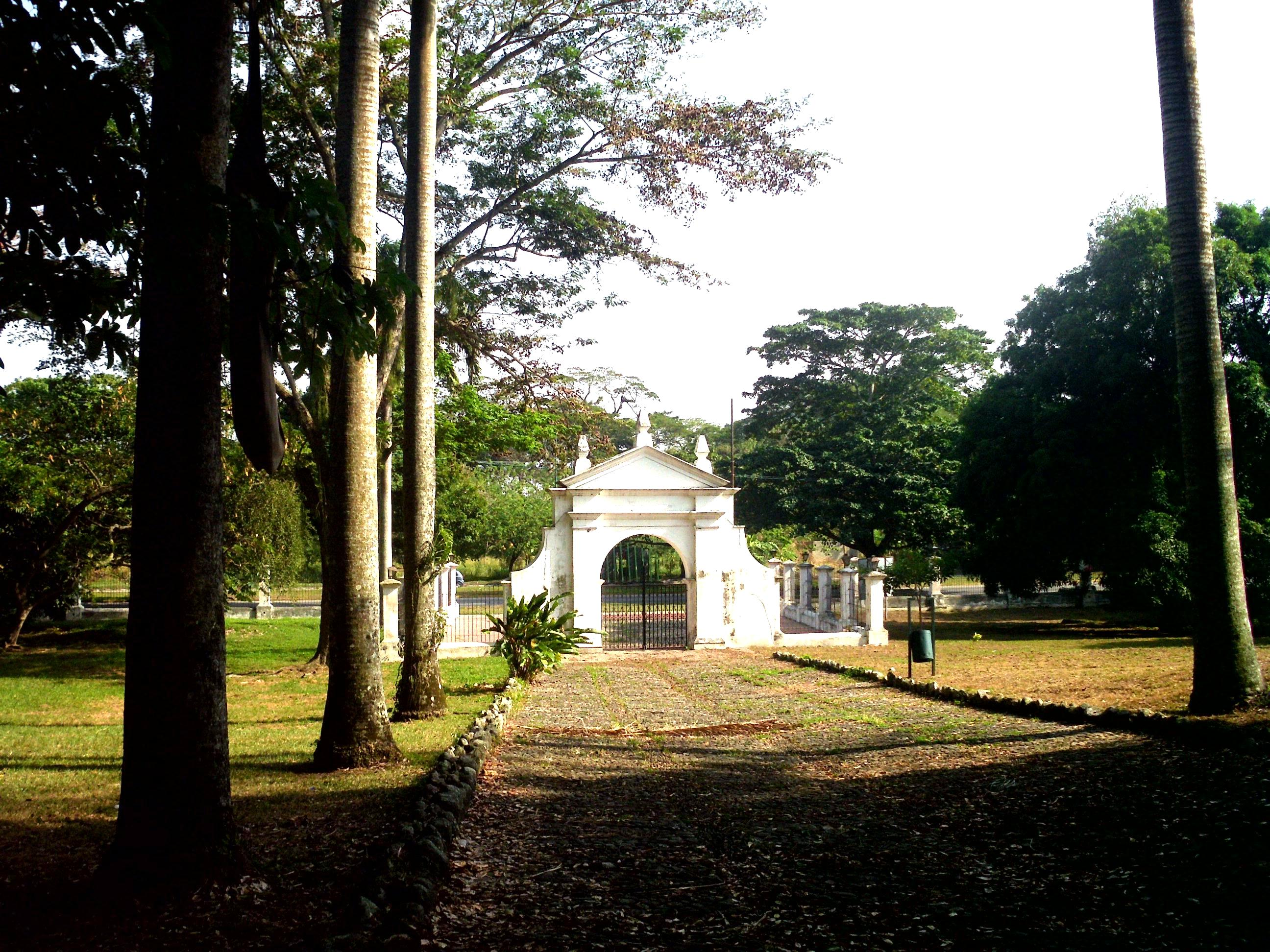
San Felipe El Fuerte Archaeological Park, shows the ruins of the ancient city of San Felipe destroyed by an earthquake in 1812

During the colony, it was integrated into the Province of Caracas. The Constitution of 1811 linked it to Barquisimeto; in the constitution sanctioned on June 23, 1824, it was awarded to the Province of Carabobo; by that of May 29, 1832, it again passed to the Province of Barquisimeto; On March 15, 1855, for the first time it was given its own status as the Province of Yaracuy, made up of the cantons of San Felipe, Yaritagua and Nírgua, with the capital San Felipe; It was the second national entity that was designated with the name of state with the advent of the Federal War and this occurred in 1859, but it was only made official with the triumph of the 1864 revolution.

Until the beginning of the 20th century it was a section of the Great Lara State. In 1909 it acquired the current territorial autonomy.

=== First settlers ===
The tribes of the Jirajaras, the Coyones, the Guayones, the Chipas, the Noaras, the Ayamanes and the Caquetíos, constituted the primitive inhabitants of the area; The Jirajaras, the Guayones and the Caquetíos distinguished themselves from these tribes, due to their expansion and dominance.

With certainty, there is little data about the way of life that the indigenous people who populated the Yaracuy regions led. The information we have is based on the references given by people who passed through those sites during colonization and on the persistent remains at that time. The Indians who inhabited the lands of the Yaracuy were almost entirely nomads, led a slightly sedentary life and lived in constant confrontation with their neighbors. They essentially relied on hunting and fishing, since they did not apply much to agriculture, something in which the jirajaras differed from the rest of the tribes, as they characterized themselves as great farmers.

These primitive inhabitants dedicated temples and offered sacrifices to the divinity, they also had combat techniques (poisoned arrows) and some ate human flesh. Their villages were sometimes up to half a mile in length, and the tribes were organized into obedient confederations, each with a chief chieftain. The women were slender and beautiful, which is why the valley was called by the Spanish "Valley of the Ladies".

=== Spanish colonization ===
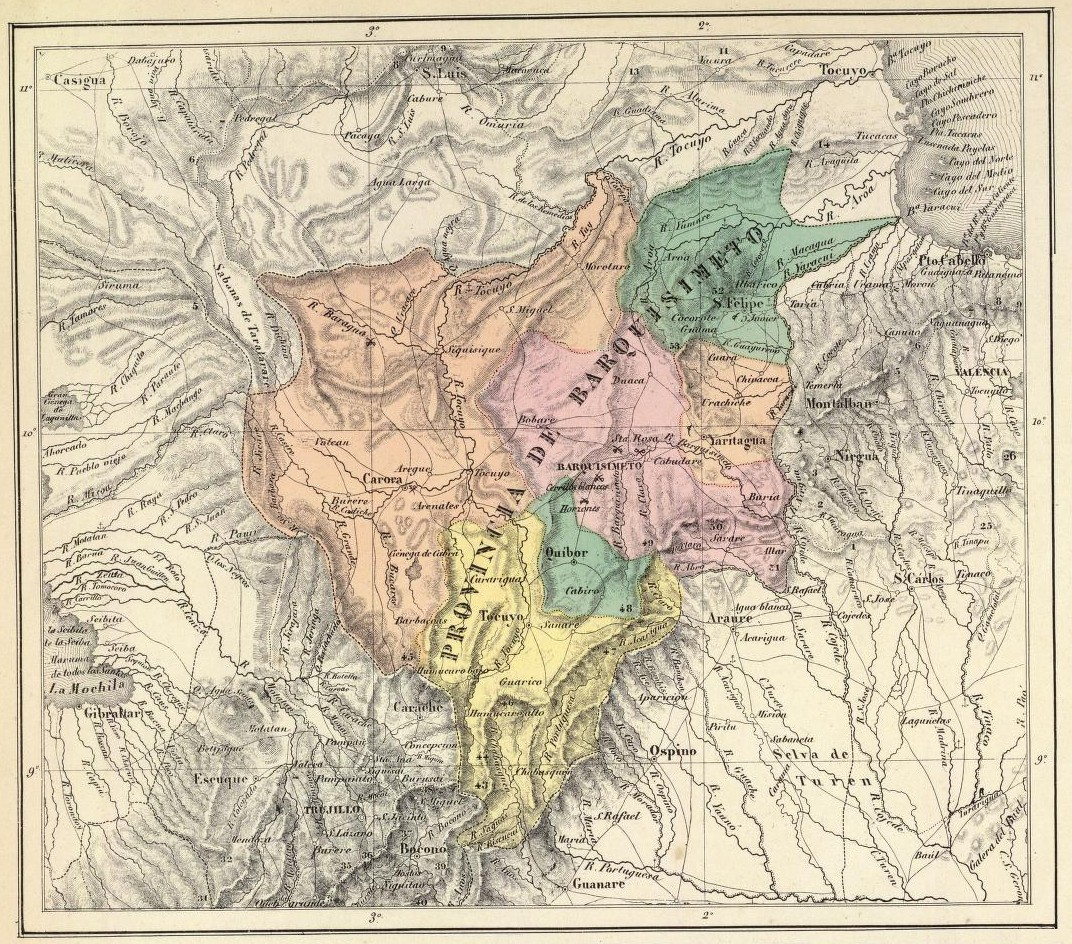
Yaracuy as part of the Province of Barquisimeto in 1840

The territory of the Yaracuy State belonged to the province of Venezuela created in 1527, then to the Province of Caracas and later the Province of Carabobo. By the Law of Territorial Political Division of the Republic of 1824, the lands of the Yaracuy State were included in the Province of Carabobo, to which the cantons of San Felipe, Yaritagua and Nirgua belonged.

=== Republican stage ===
Later in 1832 the Province of Barquisimeto was created to which the cantons of San Felipe and Yaritagua belonged, while that of Carabobo retained its jurisdiction over the canton of Nirgua, the latter being separated from the Yaracuyana community. Then in 1855, under the presidency of José Tadeo Monagas, a new province was created made up of the cantons San Felipe and Yaritagua of the Province of Barquisimeto and Nirgua, of that of Carabobo, with San Felipe as the capital. In this way, the Province of Yaracuy became one of the 21 territorial units that made up the country.

In 1864, under the Federalist Constitution it was renamed Yaracuy State and in subsequent years it was subject to several modifications until 1899, when the 20 federal states were established according to the 1864 constitution, among them Yaracuy, which since then has been maintained as a federal entity.

== Geography ==
Yaracuy State is located in the central-western region of Venezuela (Falcón, Lara, Portuguesa and Yaracuy States), between the coordinates 9º50' and 10º46' latitude North, and 68º14' y 69º14' of longitude West. It is bordered to the north by the state of Falcon, on a 105 km borderline; to the east by the state of Carabobo, on a 75 km borderline; to the south by the state of Cojedes, on an 80 km borderline; and to the east by the state of Lara, on a 205 km borderline (see map on the political-territorial division of the state of Yaracuy, on the map). Although it cannot be considered as a coastal state, it has contact with the Caribbean Sea through its main river, the Yaracuy, which flows into the Boca de Yaracuy, which represents a high potential for the growth of commercial activity in the area, both inland and abroad.

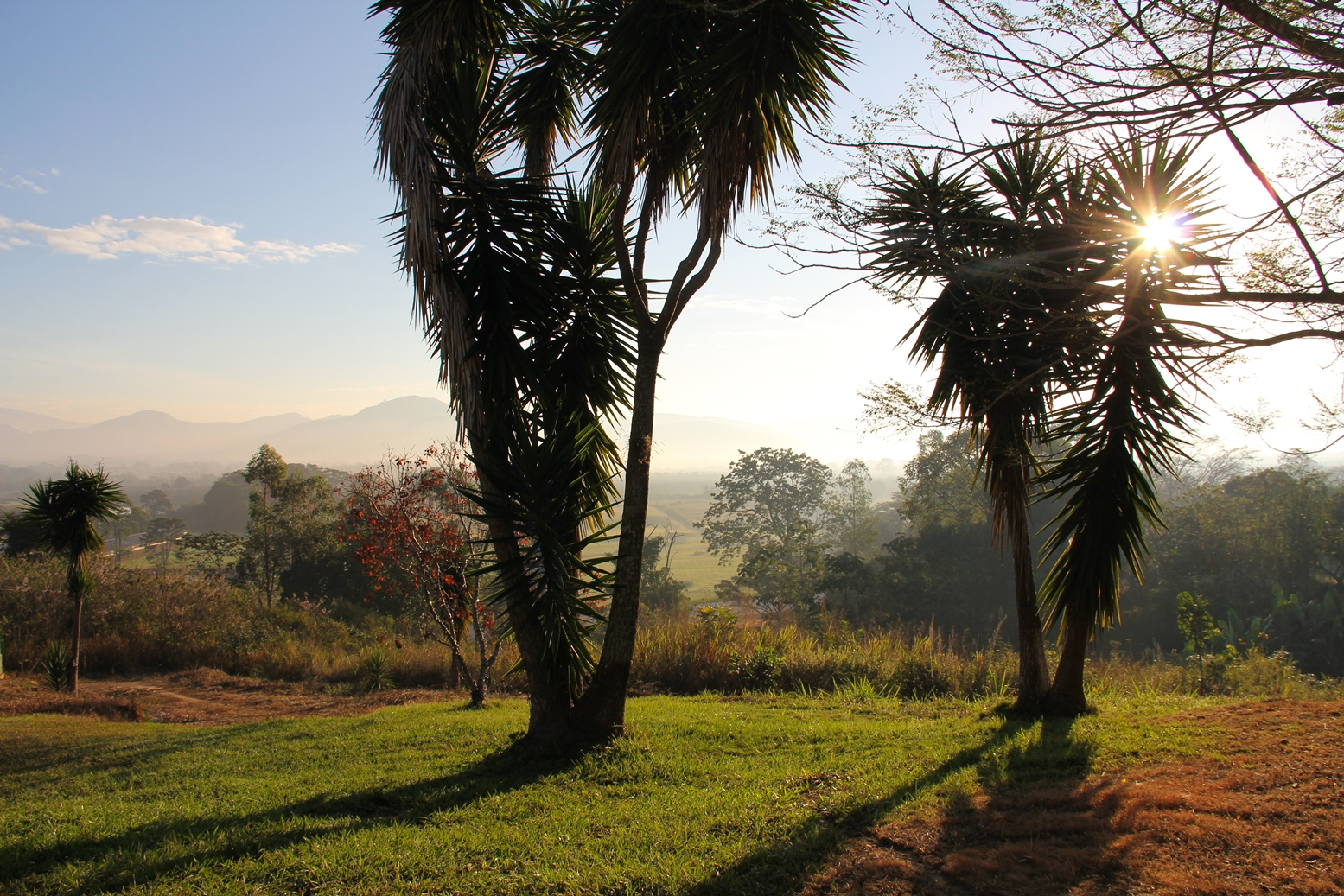
La Herrera sector, Yaracuy state

Currently, we are managing areas of overlap with the boundaries of two states: Falcón, with which 215,12 km² are under discussion, corresponding to the municipalities of Manuel Monge, Veroes and San Felipe, and with which 93,4 km² are under discussion, corresponding to the municipalities of Peñ and Nirgua, for a total of 308.5 km² in claim, which represents 4.35% of the state's surface area. The territory officially covers an area of 7,100 km², with a length of 102 km north–south and 109 km east–west. It covers 0.77% of the country's territory and is the sixth smallest entity in Venezuela, in the central-western region, with a 10.6% surface area.

=== Climate ===
Average annual temperatures and rainfall are high with variations depending on the altitude: the climate is temperate at the top of its mountains, the subtropical climate in the high valleys of the Sierra de Nirgua; and in most of the state the tropical climate prevails, with average annual temperatures of 22°C and annual rainfall of 1900 mm.

In the valleys of Aroa and Yaracuy, the average temperature is 26 °C and rainfall exceeds 1000 mm per year. Humidity conditions are optimal for cocoa cultivation in the northern sector; in San Felipe 1374 mm of rain is registered, descending to 1332 mm in Chivacoa and 1098 mm in Urachiche. In the highlands of the Sierra de Aroa and part of the Nirgua massif, rainfall is recorded during most of the year, exceeding 1400 mm per year, thus enabling the formation of its most representative vegetation, the evergreen forest.

=== Hydrography ===
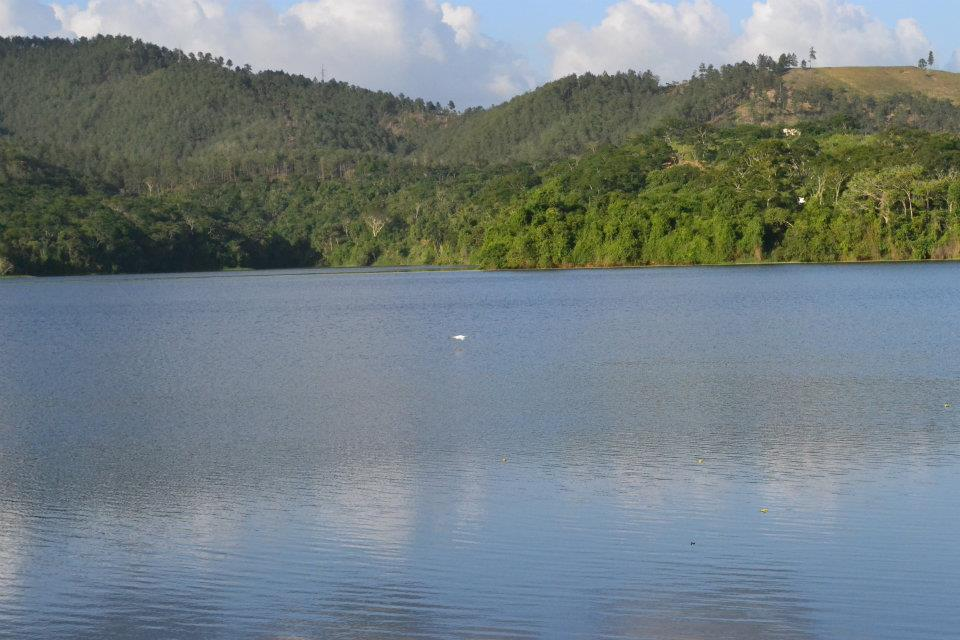
Cabuy dam, Yaracuy state

The most important rivers belong to the Caribbean basin and are the Yaracuy and Aroa, both of which are over 130 km long. The Yaracuy River crosses Yaracuy and Carabobo, where it forms the Urachiche Gorge, and has the characteristics of a plain river. In the rainy season, its waters tend to go out of the way producing floods. It receives numerous fluvial currents, like Quebrada Grande, Guama, Yurubí, Agua Blanca and Taría, among others.

The Aroa River has its source at 1200 m altitude, on the northern slope of Palo Negro Hill, north of the entity. Its basin covers an area of 2402 km², located between the basins of the Tocuyo River, to the north and west, and the Yaracuy River, to the south and east. Important tributaries are the Yumare, Tupe, Zamuro, Guarataro and Tesorero rivers, as well as the Guacamaya, Carapita, Guaicayare and Galapago streams. It flows through the Golfo Triste into the Caribbean Sea, after a journey of approximately 150 km. Other rivers such as the Turbio and Buria are shorter and flow into the Orinoco basin through the Portuguesa and Cojedes Rivers, respectively. The Cabuy, San Pablo, Yurubí, Guama, Tamboral, Yumare and Crucito Rivers are also located here.

In general, the rivers of the Yaracuy state are characterized by being irregular, that is, the rest of the rivers, outside of the main ones, do not maintain their fixed flow throughout the year; This fact is not due to evaporation, nor to deforestation at the headwaters of the rivers, nor to the rainy regime of the area. The cause of this irregularity is the nature and sandy constitution of the basin where the rivers flow.

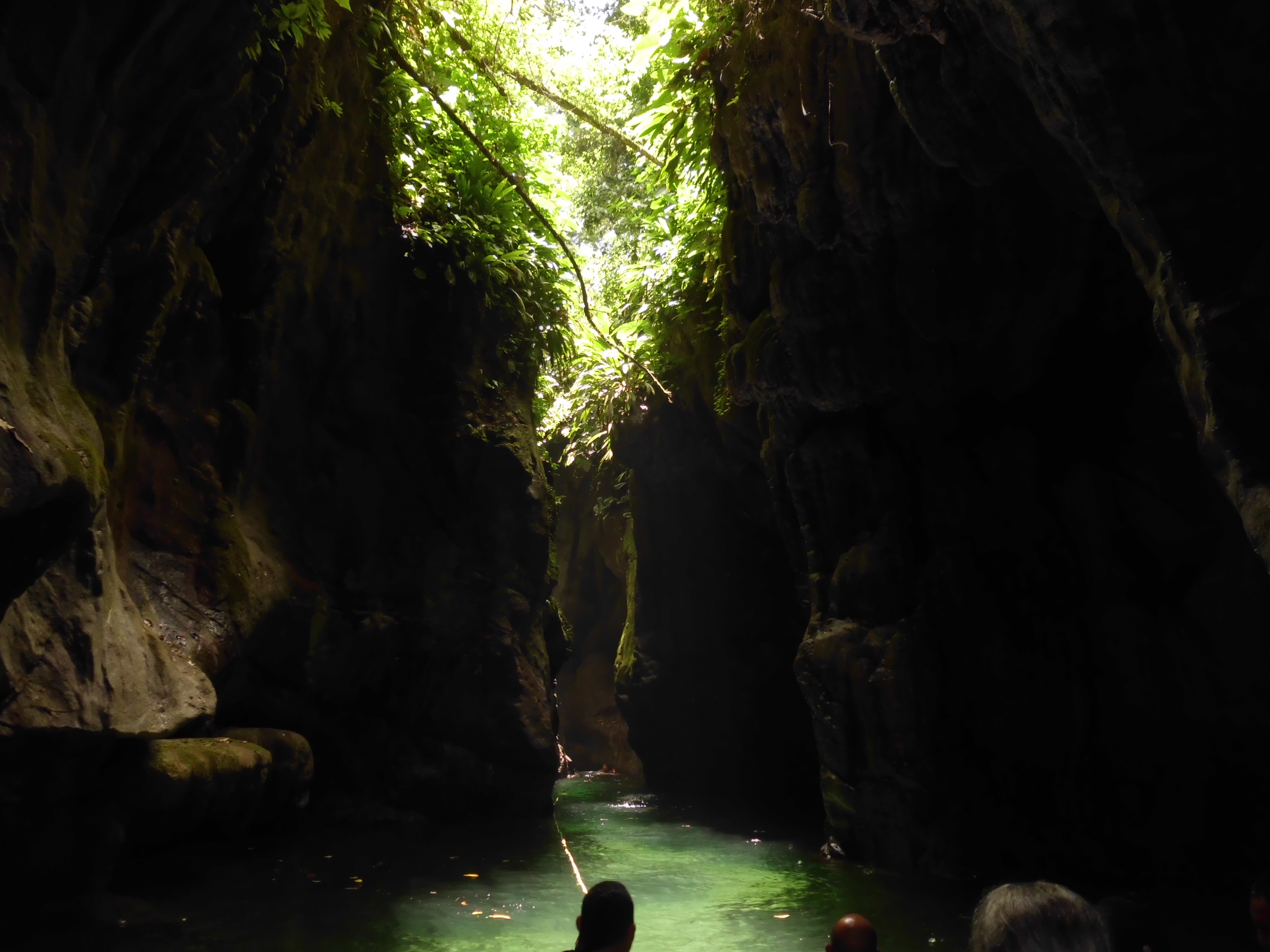
Cerro Azul waterfall, Yaracuy

Yaracuy offers throughout its geography a number of rivers such as: the Yaracuy, Yurubí, Aroa, Guama, Los Ureros, Carabobo, etc., and three reservoirs, Cumaripa, Guaremal and Cabuy. The rivers of the Yaracuy State are part of the Caribbean slope and the Atlantic slope. The Yaracuy and Aroa river basins correspond to the side of the Caribbean Sea, and the Cabuy, Turbio, Buria, and Nirgua rivers fall into the Atlantic basins, which form the hydrographic system of the Cojedes and San Carlos rivers.

Water plays a preponderant role in the development of agricultural and industrial activity. In this sense, the Yaracuy state does not present restrictions, given the abundance of water resources it possesses, due to the magnitude of the rainfall that in its territory determines high annual runoff yields in its different hydrographic basins.

Regarding groundwater, the entity has a high potential, which represents positive perspectives for the development of agriculture under irrigation.

=== Geology ===
65% of the territory of the Yaracuy state is made up of mountainous formations and foothills of hills, which in their distribution allow to differentiate three large spaces, these are: the Bobare Coordillera, which separates the Yaracuy state from the Falcón state; the Sierra de Aroa, separated from the Bobare Coordillera by the Aroa River Valley, and the Macizo de Nirgua, separated from the Sierra de Aroa by the Turbio-Yaracuy Depression, giving rise to an alternation of mountains, flat lands, valleys and depressions.

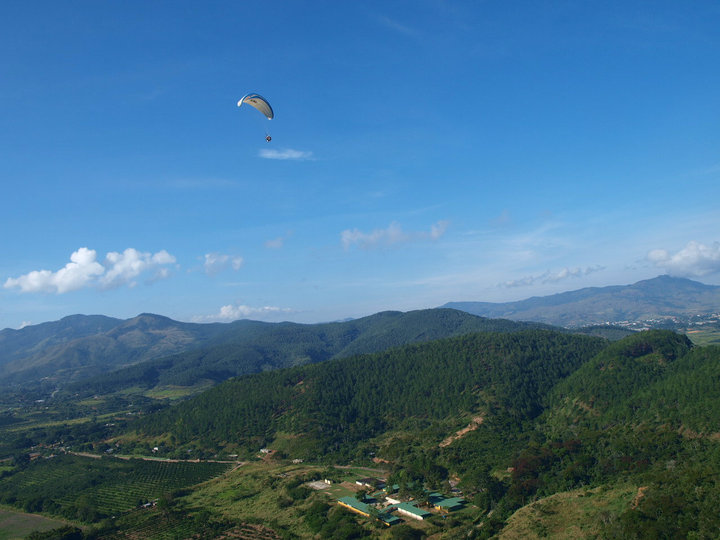
Mountainous landscape in the State of Yaracuy

=== Relief ===
The Yaracuy state relief is extremely diverse, presenting an alternation of valleys, plains, depressions, foothills and mountains (65% of the territory). It corresponds to the sector where the Coordillera de los Andes ends, and the Coordillera de la Costa begins, a sector that is occupied by three well-differentiated formations, the Macizo de Nirgua, the Sierra de Aroa and that of Bobare, the three separated from each other by the Yaracuy Turbio depression and the Aroa River Valley.

The Nirgua Massif formed by a group of foothills that are linked to the coastal range, has its culminating point at Cerro la Copa (1810 m). The Sierra de Aroa, located in the central part and oriented in a southwest–northeast direction, divides the two main depressions and has its highest point at Cerro el Tigre (1780 m). The Sierra de Bobare separates Yaracuy from Falcón.

=== Soils ===
In the northern part of Yaracuy State, sand and silt (mud) can be found mostly, while other sectors present a frank-clayey character. The state has significant mineral resource potential, especially in the non-metallic category, among which are sand and gravel, red clay, limestone, talc, marble, feldspathic sands, peat, feldspars, and gypsum.

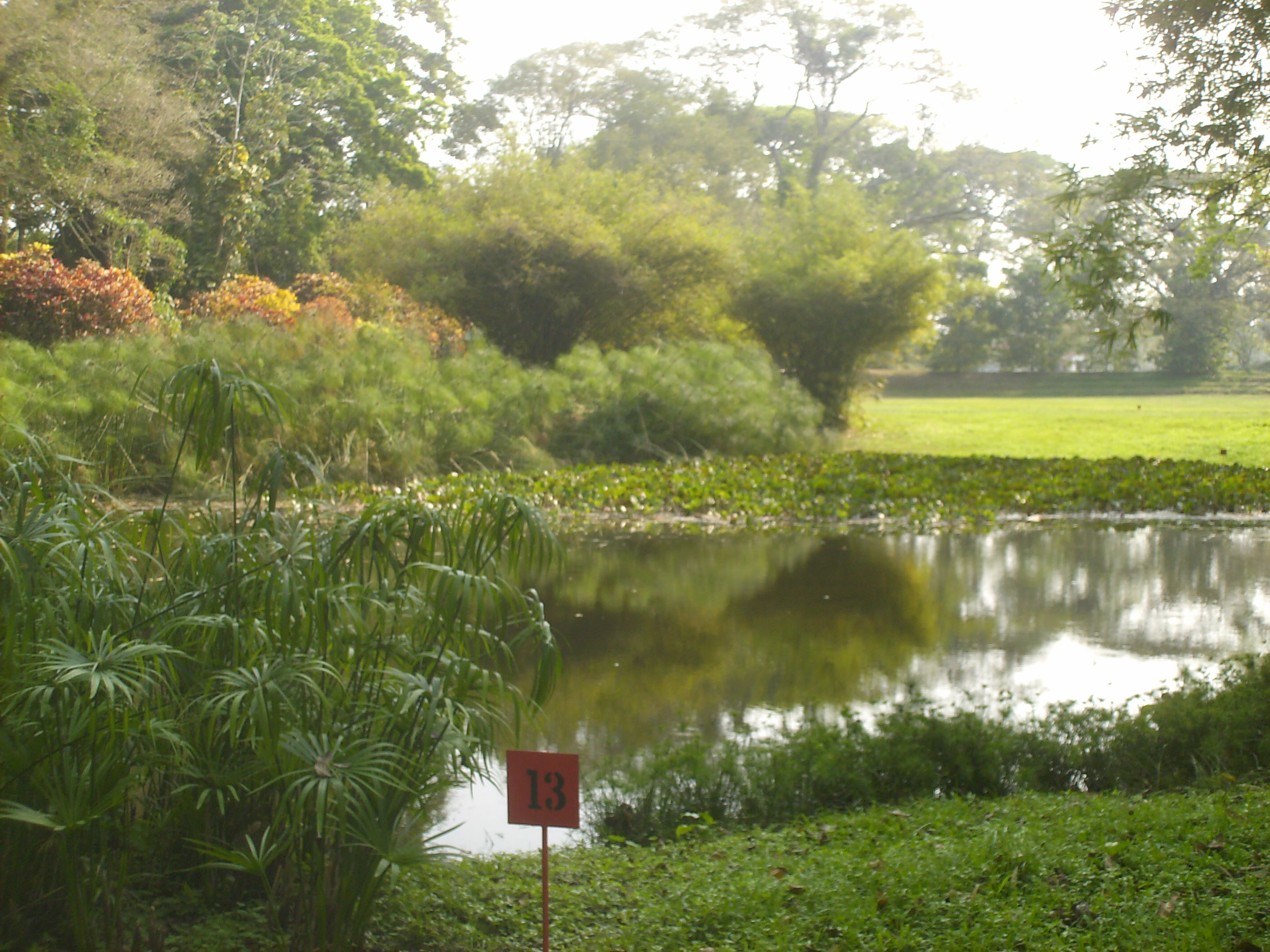
Exotic Tropical Flora Park, Yaracuy State

=== Fauna and Flora ===
The more representative vegetation of the forest entities is that, despite the interventions to which they have been subjected, it proliferates both in the valleys of the Aroaya-Yaracuyuy rivers and in the Nirgua field. At an altitude of 800msnms, a dense cloud forest develops, while on the banks of the Yar River, the forest prevails. The rest of the state space is covered by bushes, savannah vegetation, pastures and cultivated areas, fundamentally due to the greater human intervention.

==== Flora ====
The flora of the state of Yaracuy is very varied, and has been the subject of numerous studies. Some regions of the state were visited by the Swiss naturalist Henri Pittier in the 1820s, who left detailed records of his findings in numerous publications and deposited the first botanical samples in the herbarium of the Museo Comercial e Industrial de Venezuela, which later became part of the National Herbarium of Venezuela. However, botanical activity in subsequent years has been irregular and some groups of plants are still considered underrepresented in national herbariums. Recently, several specific inventories of floristic elements from the natural and cultivated regions of the state have been made.

==== Vertebrates ====
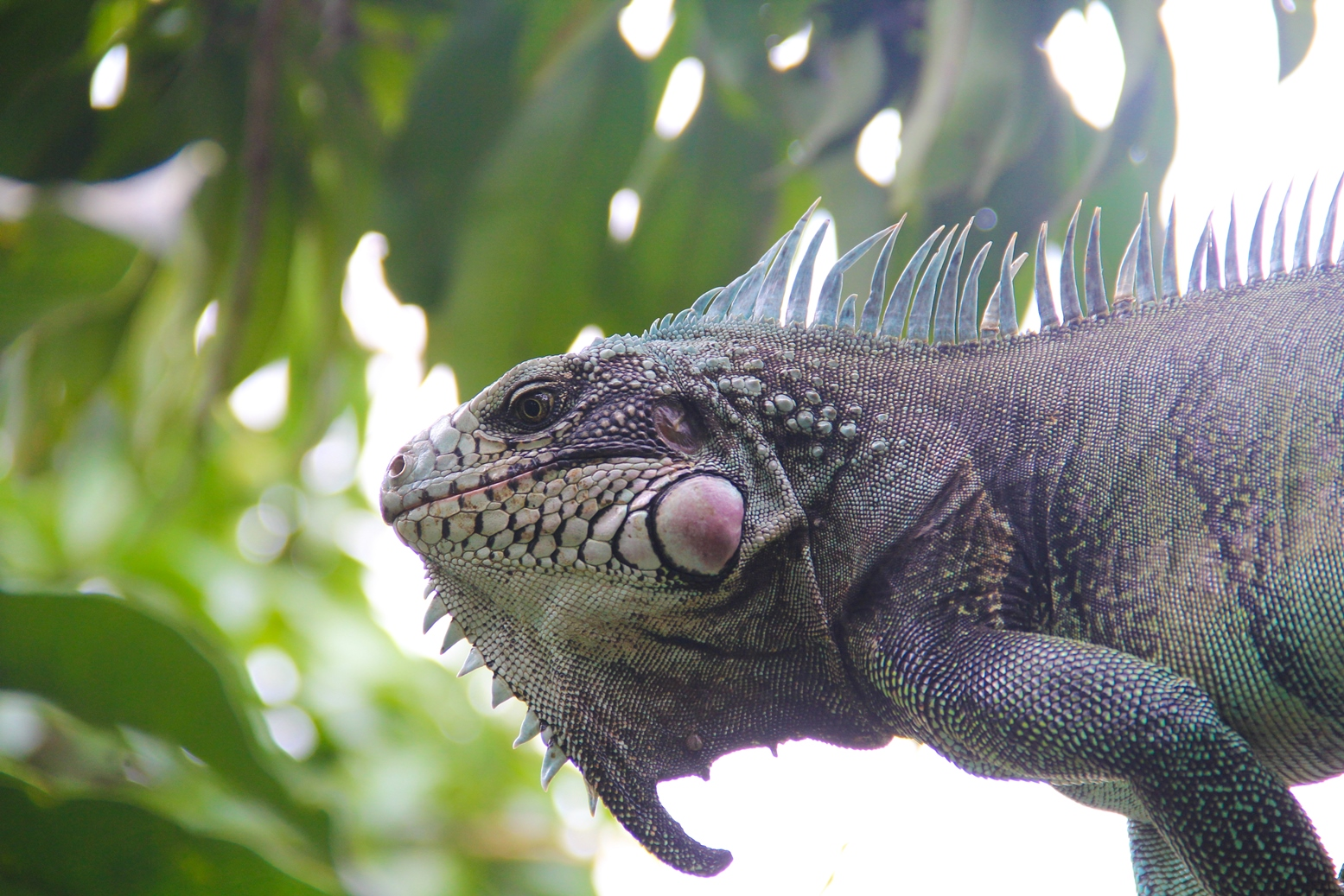
An Iguana in Nirgua, Yaracuy State

At least 40 species of land mammals and 51 species of bats have been recorded in the Sierra de Aroa, and at least one species of shrew and tree frog endemic to this locality has been described.

==== Invertebrates ====
Exhaustive inventories of the insects of the state of Yaracuy have not been published, but there are some specific studies of the diurnal butterflies and coprophagous beetles in an agricultural-forest mosaic of the foothills of Zapatero Hill in the Guáquira hacienda.

Among the butterflies, some 129 species were registered, predominantly from the family Nymphalidae, but it is estimated that there are more than 240 species. At least 22 species of beetles were also found, including a species endemic to Venezuela, Bdelyropsis venezuelensis Howden, 1976.

== Government and politics ==
Like other states, the structure of the government of Yaracuy is laid out in the Constitution, the highest law in the state.

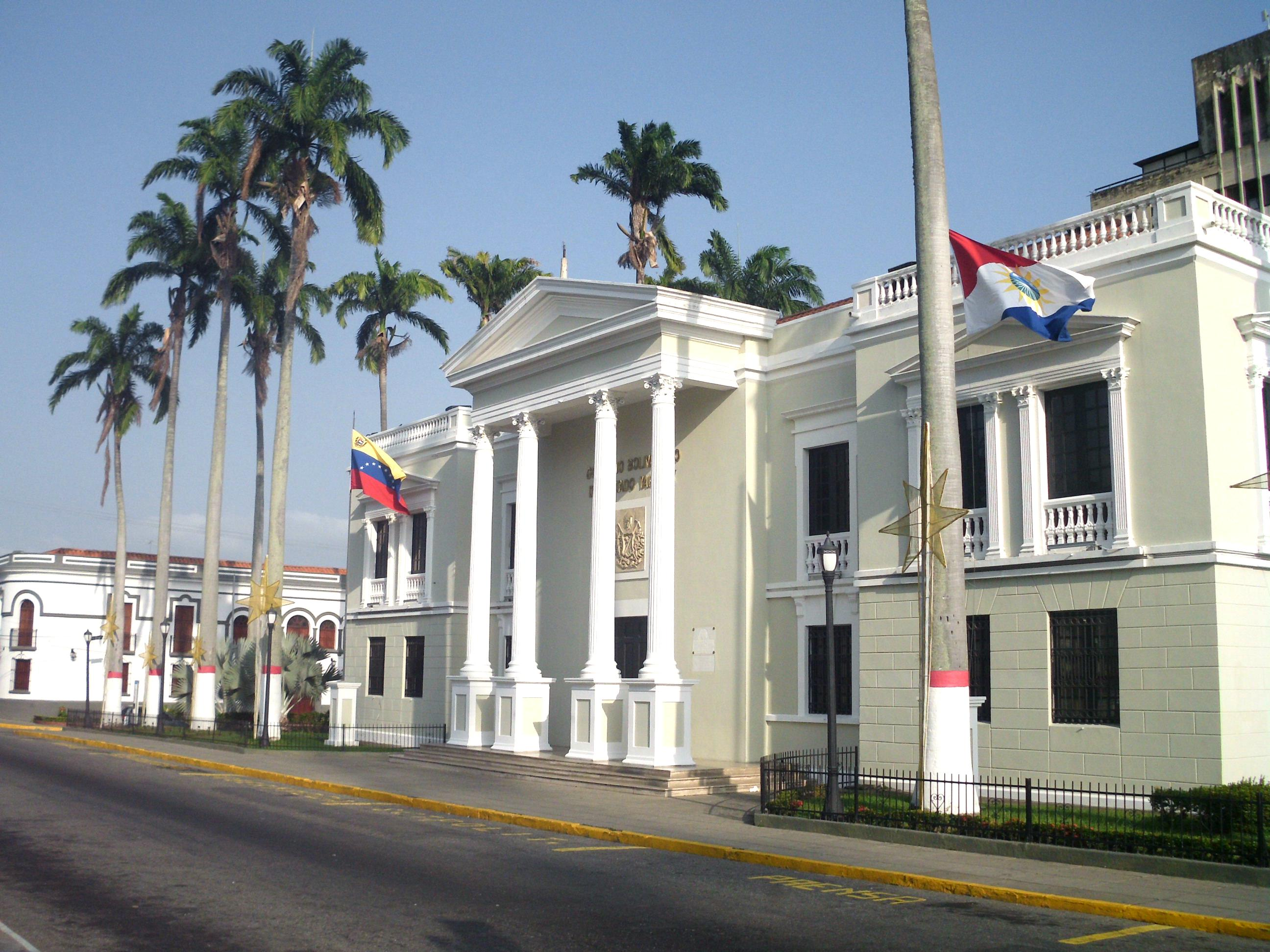
Government Palace of Yaracuy, seat of the State Government

Like the other 23 federal entities of Venezuela, the State maintains its own police force, which is supported and complemented by the National Police and the Venezuelan National Guard.

=== Executive power ===
It is made up of the Yaracuy State Governor and a group of State Secretaries appointed by him who assist him in government functions. The Governor is elected by the people by direct and secret vote for a period of four years and with the possibility of immediate reelection for equal periods, being in charge of the state administration.

Since 1989, governors have been chosen in direct elections by the population, the current government is headed by Julio César León Heredia, who has been in power since 2008.

=== Legislative power ===
The state legislature rests on the Yaracuy State Legislative Council, a unicameral parliament, elected by the people by direct and secret vote every four years, being able to be re-elected for additional consecutive periods, under a system of proportional representation of the state population and its municipalities, the State has 9 deputies. The regional parliament approves the local budget and state laws.

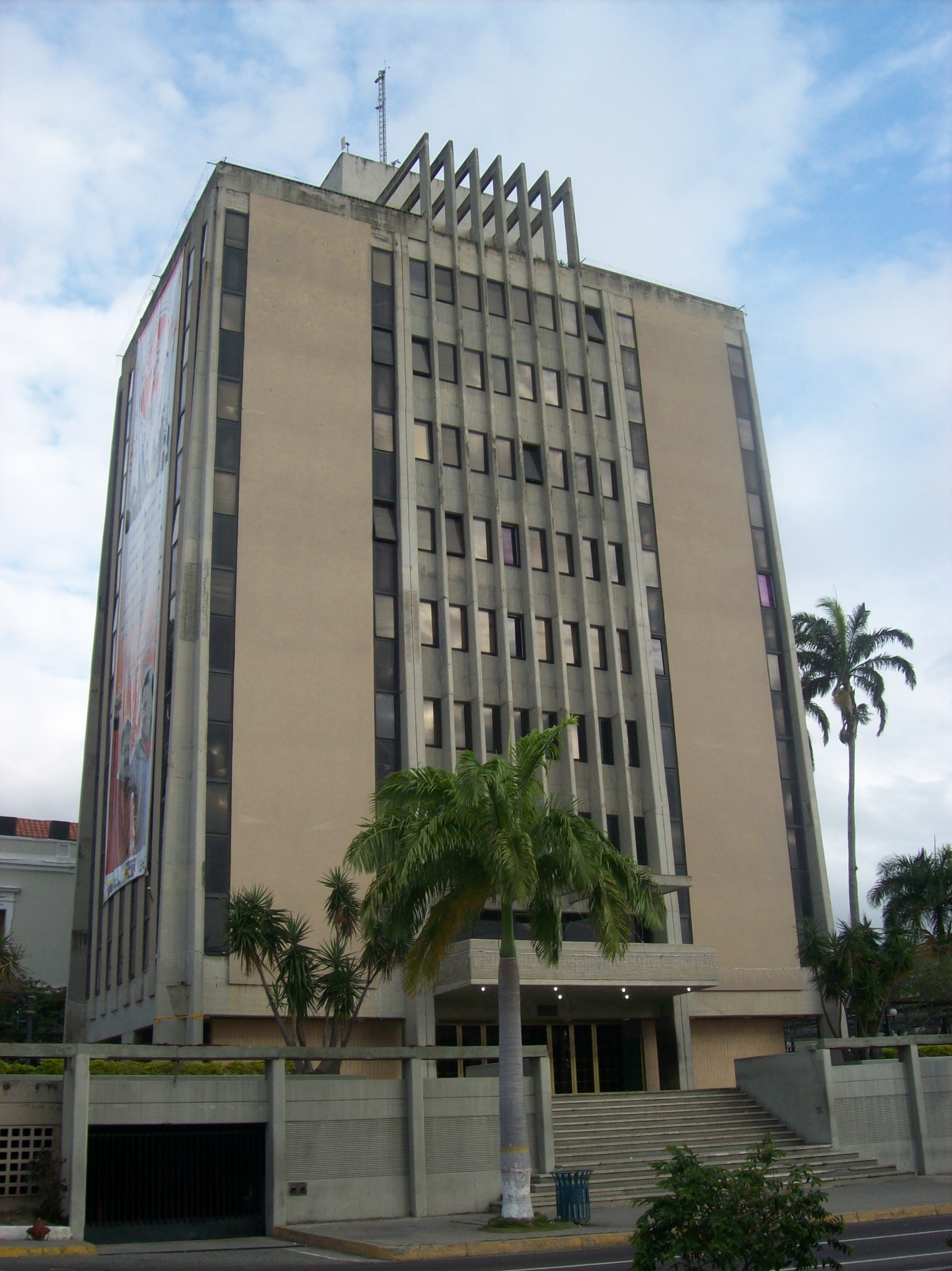
One of the administrative buildings of the Government of Yaracuy

== Municipalities and municipal seats ==
Yaracuy is divided into fourteen municipalities:

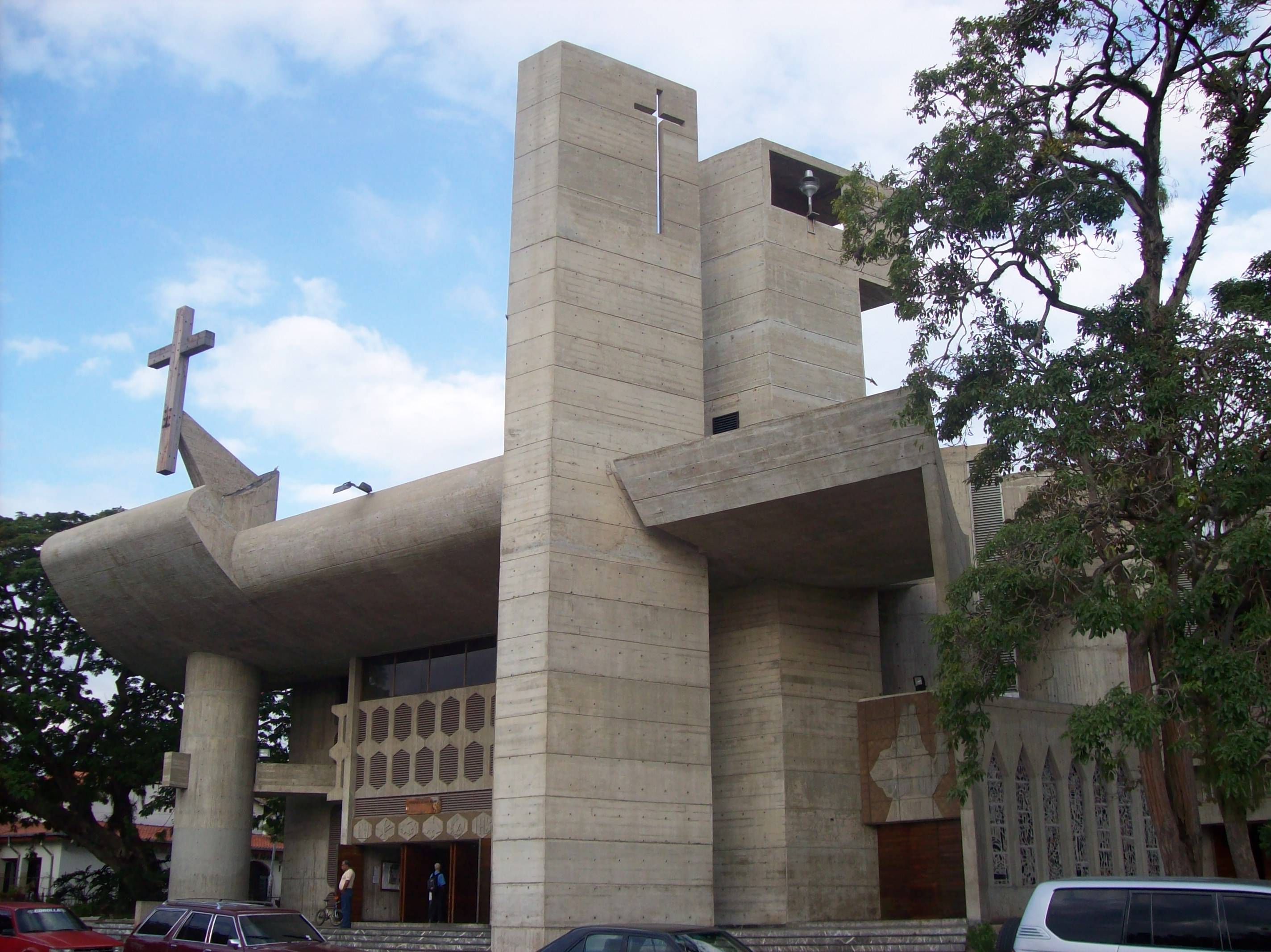
San Felipe Cathedral, San Felipe Municipality

#	Municipality	Seat
1	Aristides Bastidas	San Pablo
2	Bolívar	Aroa
3	Bruzual	Chivacoa
4	Cocorote	Cocorote
5	Independencia	Independencia
6	Jose Antonio Paez	Sabana de Parra
7	La Trinidad	Boraure
8	Manuel Monge	Yumare
9	Nirgua	Nirgua
10	Peña	Yaritagua
11	San Felipe	San Felipe de Yaracuy
12	Sucre	Guama
13	Urachiche	Urachiche
14	Veroes	Farriar

The state capital is San Felipe de Yaracuy. Other important towns are Aroa, Chivacoa, Cocorote, Marín, Nirgua, Sabana de Parra, Yaritagua, and Urachiche.

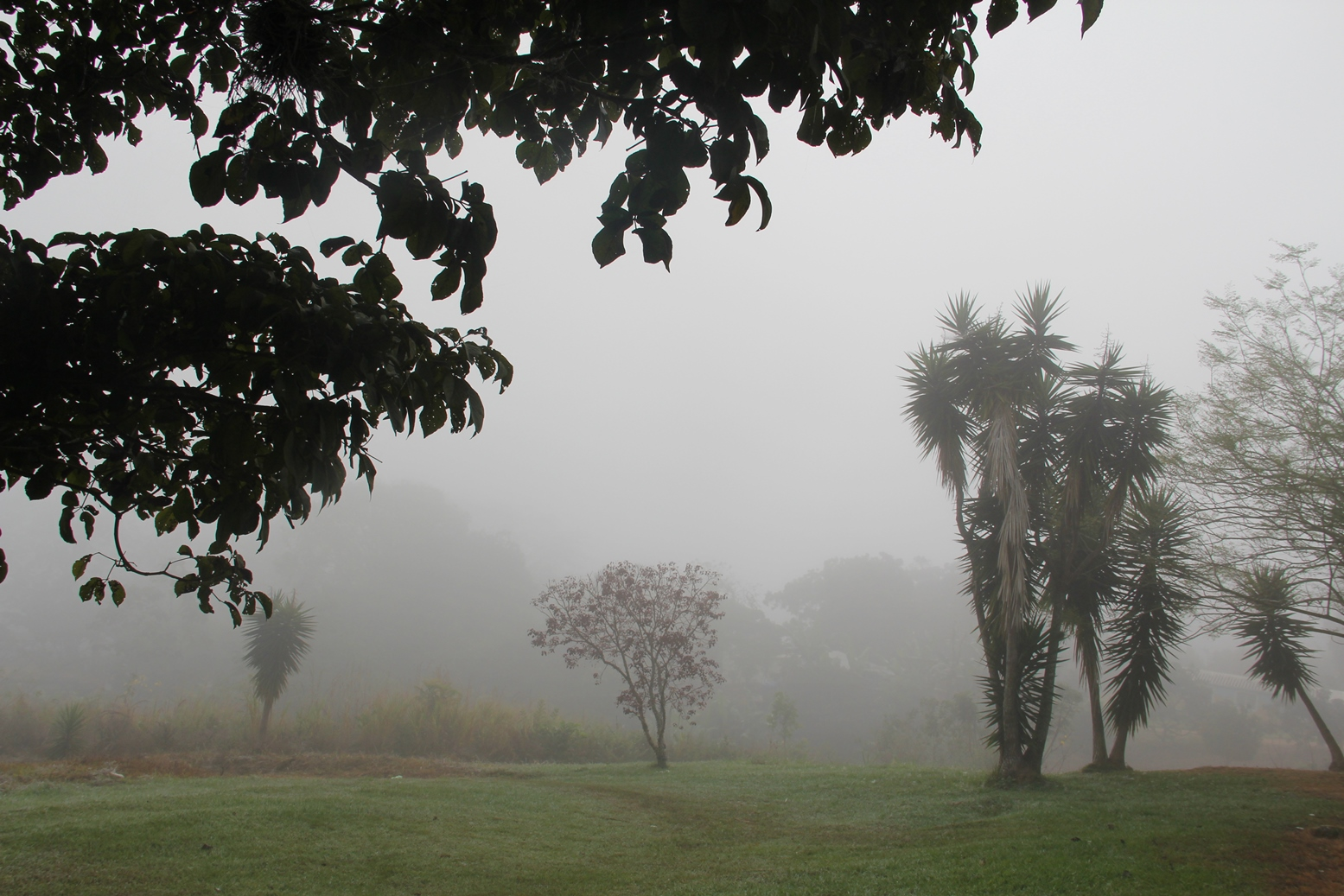
Fog in the Nirgua Municipality

Yaracuy State covers a total surface area of 7,100 km^{2} (2,700 sq mi). Population: 597,700 inhabitants (2007 est).

== Demographics ==
Historical population
Year	Pop.	±% p.a.
1873	71,689	—
1881	79,822	+1.35%
1891	85,844	+0.73%
1920	108,022	+0.80%
1926	122,836	+2.17%
1936	123,964	+0.09%
1941	127,030	+0.49%
1950	132,436	+0.46%
1961	175,291	+2.58%
1971	223,545	+2.46%
1981	300,597	+3.01%
1990	384,536	+2.77%
2001	499,049	+2.40%
2011	600,852	+1.87%
Source: "XIV CENSO NACIONAL DE POBLACIÓN Y VIVIENDA - Resultados por Entidad Federal y Municipio del Estado Yaracuy" (PDF). Instituto Nacional de Estadística.

=== Race and ethnicity ===
According to the 2011 Census, the racial composition of the population was:

Racial composition	Population	%
Mixed (Mestizo)	—N/a	58.4
White	229,542	35.5
Black	31,683	4.9
Other race	—N/a	1.2

== Culture ==
The state of Yaracuy is represented by a rich social and cultural variety. It maintains ancestral roots since the Yaracuyan is, particularly, "lover of his land". Nevertheless, the customs give place, at the same time, to the modern lines of expression.

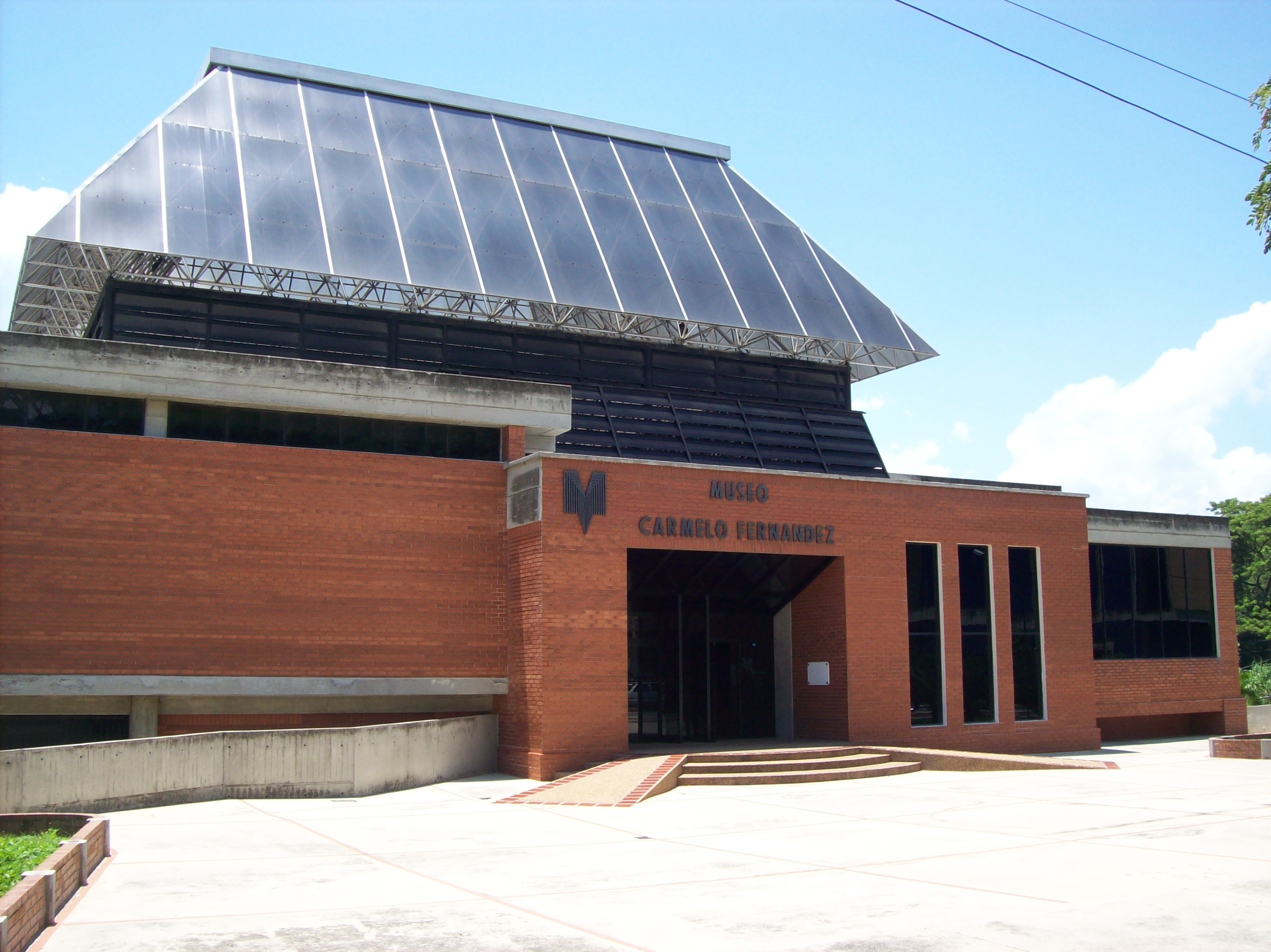
Carmelo Fernández Museum in the Andrés Bello Cultural Complex, Yaracuy

The Procers: The fact that each Educational Institution bears the name of some Procer (local or national), and whose biography becomes part of the preparation of the students, is striking. Schools and colleges celebrate the dates inherent to the character to whom the educational and formative path is dedicated.

Religious Diversity: As in all Venezuela, Yaracuy also celebrates with great effort the Catholic festivities: Holy Week (with the usual processions), The Burning of Judas, The Birth of the Child Jesus (Nativity of the Lord), among others. However, there is also room and relevance for celebrations based on other religious samples, own and/or imported from the colonial era, such as: The Carnival, Dances on Embers, among others.

They are part of the cultural heritage of Yaracuy, an endless number of legends and myths, own in some cases, adaptations in another; that even enjoy representations in different festivals and events.

Other dances, Creole dances and rondas are: El Sebucán, Mare Mare and El Pájaro Guarandol.
