= Annual growth rate =

Difference in value over time

Annual growth rate (AGR) is the change in the value of a measurement over the period of a year.

== Economics ==
Annual growth rate is a useful tool to identify trends in investments. According to a survey of nearly 200 senior marketing managers conducted by The Marketing Accountability Standards Board, 69% of subjects responded that they consider average annual growth rate to be a useful measurement. The formula used to calculate annual growth rate uses the previous year as a base. Over longer periods of time, compound annual growth rate (CAGR) is generally an acceptable metric for average growth rates.

=== Measure of success ===
Perceptions of the success or failure of many enterprises and businesses are based on assessments of their growth. Measurements of year-on-year growth, however, are complicated by two simple factors:

- Changes over time in the base from which growth is measured. Such changes might include increases in the number of stores, markets, or salespeople. This issue is addressed by using 'same store' measures (or corollary measures for markets, sales personnel and so on).
- Compounding growth over multiple periods. For example, if a company achieves 30% growth in one year, but its results remain unchanged over the two subsequent years, this would not be the same as 10% growth in each of three years. CAGR, the compound annual growth rate, addresses this issue.

=== Calculations ===
"Percentage growth is the central plank of year-on-year analysis. Dividing the results for the current period by the results for the prior period will yield a comparative figure. Subtracting one from the other will highlight the increase or decrease between periods. When evaluating the comparatives, one might say that results in Year 2 were, for example, 110% of those in Year 1. To convert this figure to a growth rate, one need only subtract 100%. The periods considered are often years, but any time-frame can be chosen."

The first step of this process is to identify the value of the investment at the beginning and end of the year. The next step is to subtract the beginning value from the end value. Dividing the difference by the beginning value, and then multiplying the answer by 100 converts it to a percentage.

== Notes and references ==
Works cited

- As of 12/20/2011, this article is derived in whole or in part from Marketing Metrics: The Definitive Guide to Measuring Marketing Performance by Farris, Bendle, Pfeifer and Reibstein. The copyright holder has licensed the content in a manner that permits reuse under CC BY-SA 3.0 and GFDL. All relevant terms must be followed.
