= National Institute of Statistics (Venezuela) =

Statistics National Institute of Venezuela

- Instituto Nacional de Estadística
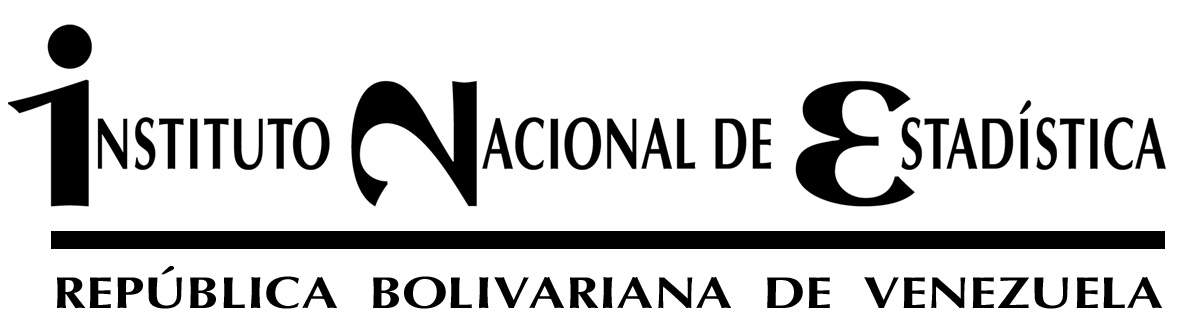

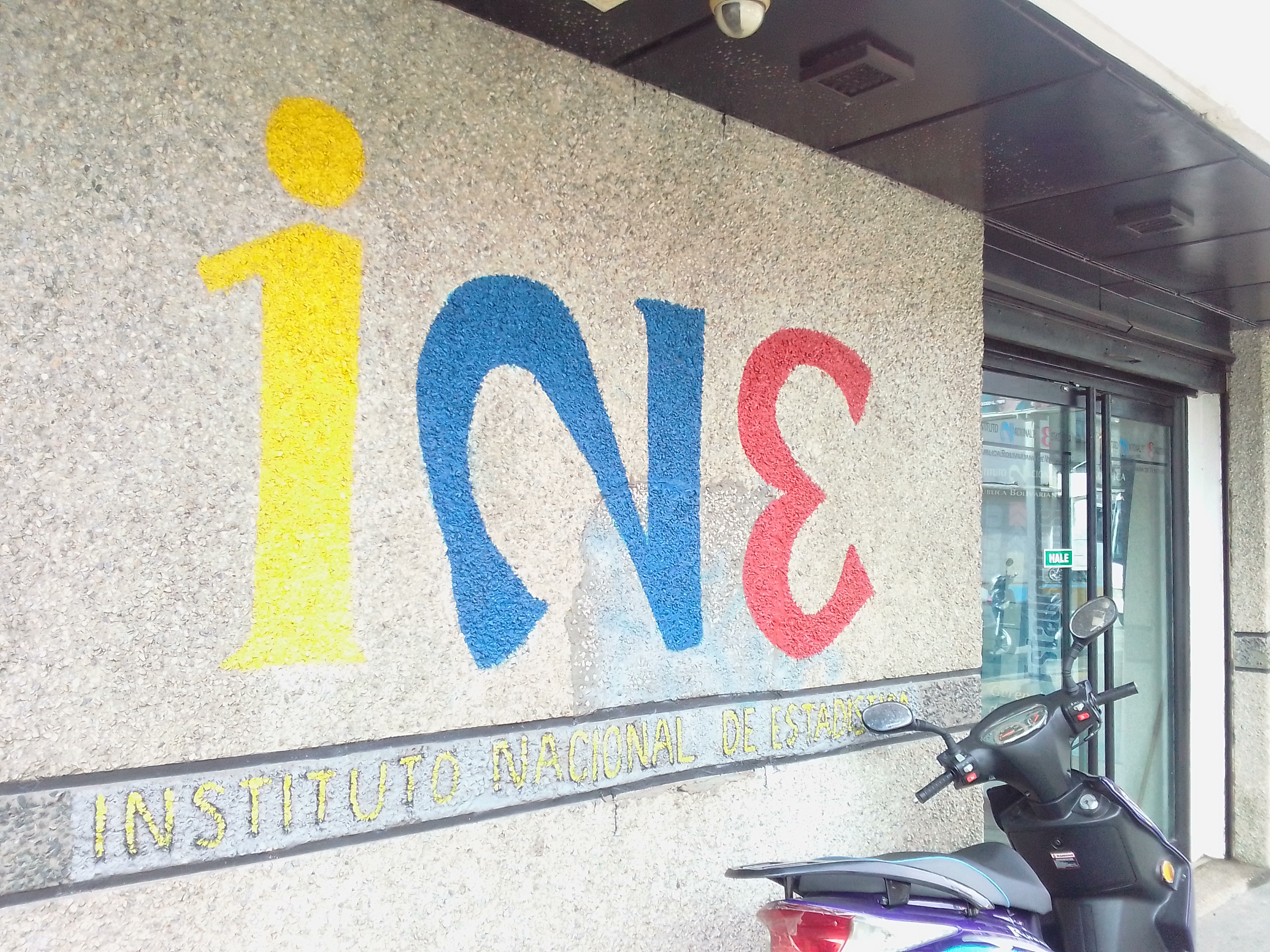
- Headquarters

Agency overview
- Website: www.ine.gov.ve

The Instituto Nacional de Estadística (INE, National Institute of Statistics) is the main public statistical body of the Government of Venezuela and is in charge of the systematization and publication of statistical data in Venezuela.

== History ==
The General Directorate of Statistics was created in 1871 as part of the Ministry of Development. The aim was to collect important agricultural and economic information for the country. In 1873, the First National Population Census was carried out, which produced a total population of 1,783,993 inhabitants; in 1881 the second was carried out and in 1991 the third. Thus, one of the Directorate's most significant accomplishments was the conduct of general population censuses with some regularity in the country. Venezuela has carried out 14 censuses from the first one carried out in the year 1873 to 2011.

In 1978, the Central Office of Statistics and Informatics was created as a part of the Ministry of Development. A few months before the approval of the Statistical Public Function Law (November 2001), officially the institution acquired the name Instituto Nacional de Estadística.
