= María Lionza (disambiguation) =

María Lionza is one of the main deities in Venezuelan spiritism.

María Lionza may also refer to:

- María Lionza (statue), monument in Caracas
- María Lionza, a 2006 Venezuelan telefilm starring Ruddy Rodríguez
- "María Lionza", a 1978 song by Rubén Blades and Willie Colón from Siembra
- "Maria Lionza", a 2009 composition by Devendra Banhart from What Will We Be
