= Cumaripa Reservoir Recreational Park =

Reservoir and recreational park in Yaracuy, Venezuela

Coordinates: 10.155°N 68.810°W

Cumaripa
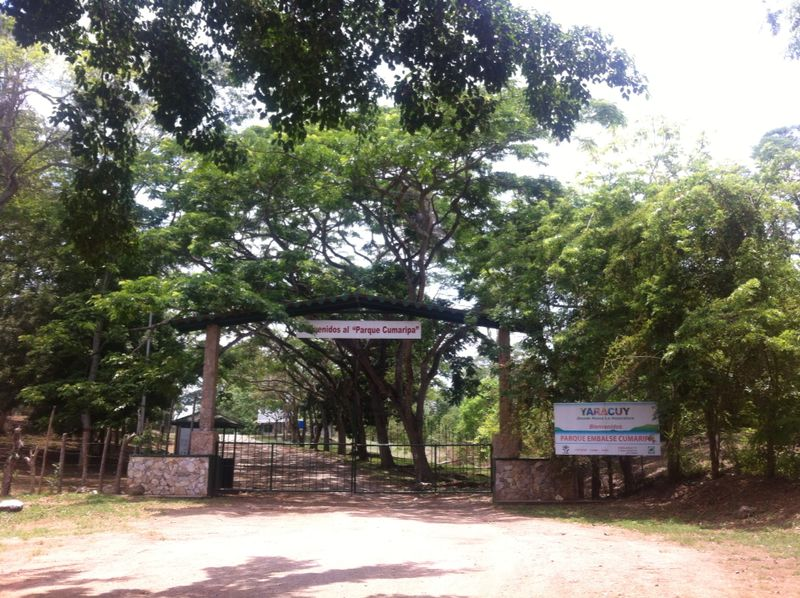
- Interactive map of Cumaripa
- Country: Venezuela
- Location: Yaracuy
- Purpose: Water supply, irrigation, and flood control
- Opening date: 1971
- Owner: Venezuelan State

The Cumaripa Reservoir Recreational Park (in Spanish: Parque de Recreación Embalse Cumaripa), also known as Cumaripa Park or simply Cumaripa, is one of five dams in Yaracuy State and a Venezuelan park, serving as the most significant water reservoir in the state. Located at a site called Faltriquera, it is primarily formed by the damming of the Yaracuy River, southeast of Chivacoa, Yaracuy, Venezuela. Positioned 4 km downstream from the Cumaripa Bridge, near the road connecting Chivacoa and Nirgua, it mainly floods lands in the Bruzual Municipality. It is also known as the Ing. Francisco C. Amelinck Reservoir, named after its chief civil engineer.

The reservoir has a normal capacity of 63.82 hm³, with an average annual runoff of 57.26 hm³, and a maximum capacity of 86.75 hm³. It covers an area of 850.75 hectares.

Inaugurated in 1971, it currently supplies drinking water to San Felipe and Cocorote, supports irrigation for 1,600 hectares across the Bruzual, Sucre, Urachiche, and San Felipe municipalities, and controls flooding, sediment, and pollution.

== History ==
The Cumaripa Reservoir project was developed by the Foundation for the Development of Venezuela’s Central-Western Region, and construction was tendered by the Ministry of Public Works in 1967, under the presidency of Raúl Leoni. Before the dam’s inauguration, basic information for planning the Cumaripa irrigation system was presented in a course held between August and December 1968, based on PERT techniques, with participation from 14 Venezuelan professionals, 2 from Bolivia, 2 from Ecuador, and 4 from Peru. In 1970, a specialist from the Inter-American Institute of Agricultural Sciences was sent to reorient activities in the Yaracuy area, prioritizing training for personnel to manage the Cumaripa irrigation area. The Cumaripa irrigation project benefited approximately 10,000 hectares already in operation, increasing the total irrigated area by 7%.

Currently, in addition to the Cumaripa Reservoir, the Venezuelan government has created small lagoons in the municipalities to enable countrymen organizations to irrigate crops during periods of adverse weather conditions that threaten plantings in the summer.

== The dam ==
The dam is located 4 km southeast of the urban center of Chivacoa. It is a straight gravity dam constructed from concrete, featuring a submerged rectangular intake, a pressure conduit, a tunnel, a control structure, and a bifurcation for irrigation and water supply. The regulation mechanisms consist of four Rodney Hunt brand sliding flat gates (two for emergency and two for regulation), measuring 1.50 x 1.50 m. The average maximum discharge is 29 m³/s.

The dam is equipped with a frontal and free spillway system, with a discharge capacity of 500 m³/s.

== The reservoir ==
The Cumaripa Reservoir is the most important water reservoir in Yaracuy State. The primary rivers feeding the reservoir are the Yaracuy and Sarare rivers, with the former’s watershed being more heavily impacted by human activity than the latter. Other dams in Yaracuy State include the Cabuy (for irrigation), Durute (for irrigation), and Guaremal (for sediment control, flood control, and drinking water supply) reservoirs.

The reservoir occupies an area of 850.75 hectares in the Yaracuy River valley at the site called Faltriquera. Its corresponding hydrographic basin covers 435 km². It has a normal capacity of 63.82 hm³, of which 63.7 hm³ are usable, and a maximum capacity of 86.76 hm³. The average annual inflow is 57.26 hm³, with a projected flood flow of 190 m³/s.

=== Human occupation ===
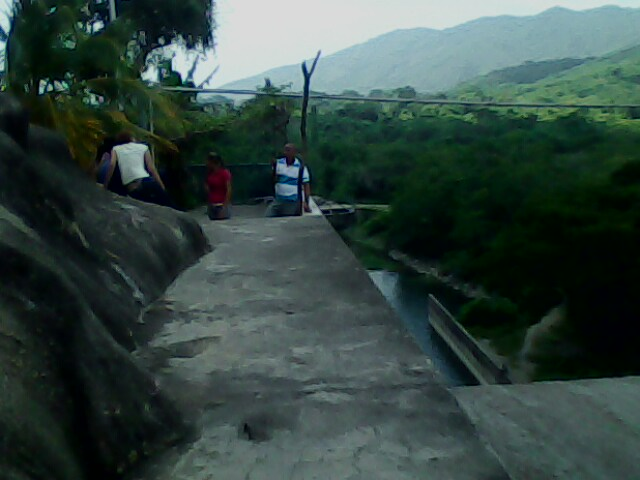
Part of the crest visited by tourists.

The Yaracuy River was navigable for small vessels transporting cocoa and copper from the Aroa Mountains’ mines, recognized since 1605, to the Caribbean Sea. It was also a route for smuggling to the Antilles, even under pursuit by the Guipuzcoan Company starting in 1728. The deforestation of extensive jungles in the plains, primarily in lowland forests, produced high-quality timber; fortunately, elevated lands and flood-prone areas were often inaccessible.

Between the Cumaripa Reservoir and the El Peñón Bridge, the Yaracuy River receives water draining from the Aroa Mountains, northwest of the river’s valley. After leaving the reservoir and before reaching El Peñón, the Yaracuy River receives water from 17 or more rivers and streams on its right bank and at least five streams from the Aroa Mountains on its left bank, flowing west to east.

The use of water in the modified agricultural environment led to the creation of the Cumaripa Reservoir in 1973 in the middle basin of the Yaracuy and Sarare rivers, covering approximately 2,280 km². The Yaracuy River shows significant human intervention in its middle and lower basins, except for protected areas, primarily the Yurubí National Park (23,670 ha), which covers parts of the highest elevations and slopes of the Aroa Mountains, reaching the foothills, and is likely one of the best-preserved protected areas in northern Venezuela.

=== Sediment ===
The agricultural production system used by producers in the Yaracuy River’s hydrographic basin was subsistence-based and covered 11,950 ha. The practice of cutting and burning forests was used to establish conucos or smallholdings on slopes between 30 and 65%. The main crops grown were maize, beans, yam, guandu, sweet potato, and taro, as well as 2,642 ha of coffee.

This degrading production system accelerated erosion, causing mass soil movements (landslides, slips), widespread sheet erosion, and the formation of local rills and gullies, leading to severe deterioration of natural resources. Sediments from erosion caused siltation in the Cumaripa Reservoir, which supplies water to the city of San Felipe, the capital of Yaracuy State, and neighboring populations.

The progression of reservoir sedimentation shows that sediments are three meters above the intake structure. The reservoir’s tail is completely silted, with only a small water surface disconnected from the main body downstream of the Nirgua-Chivacoa highway viaduct. It has been determined that sediments occupy 49.8% of the reservoir’s total capacity. The specific sediment production calculated for the upper Yaracuy River basin is 3,611 m³/km²/year, 21.7 times higher than the estimated production in the reservoir’s design.

The lifespan of a reservoir depends partly on how quickly it loses storage capacity due to sediment deposited by currents. The Venezuelan Ministry of the Environment estimated that, at the current sedimentation rate, the reservoir will have a lifespan of only 30 years.

== Climate ==
The Cumaripa Reservoir is located in a tropical rainy savanna climate. The rainy season in the region begins in April and extends through October, with an average precipitation of 1,032.6 mm during this period, August being the wettest month. The remaining months, November to March, represent the dry season, with an average precipitation of 4.5 mm, January being the driest month.

The average maximum temperature is 32 °C, and the average minimum is 16 °C.

== Flora ==
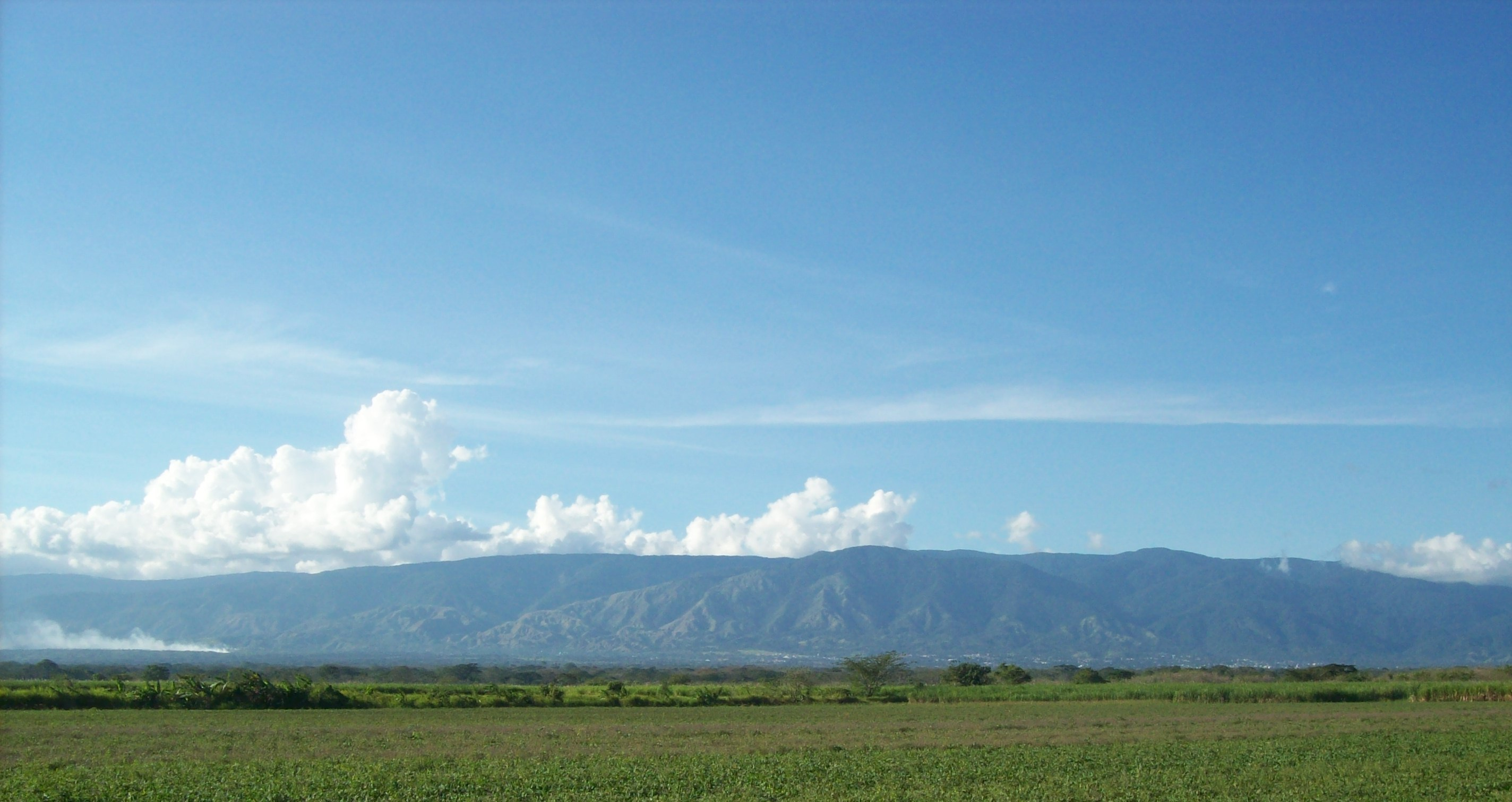
Part of the Aroa Mountains, viewed from the town of Durute, north of the Cumaripa Reservoir.

The vegetation surrounding the reservoir and forming part of the recreational park consists of cloud forest, found above 1,000 meters of altitude. This forest is rich in species, many of which are endemic, with most developing along ravines.

The area around Cumaripa Park is flat with small depressions. The local slope is approximately 2%. The current use is for maize cultivation, previously in fallow. The soil is considered well-drained.

== Fauna ==
The fauna in the area surrounding the Cumaripa Reservoir is diverse, including various bird species such as hawks, owls, turpials, blackbirds, kiskadees, and guans; reptiles, particularly snakes like the boa constrictor and the rattlesnake; and mammals such as the deer and the ocelot.

== Use ==
=== Agricultural ===
The waters allocated in the Cumaripa Reservoir can be treated through conventional processes of coagulation, flocculation, sedimentation, filtration, and chlorination for drinking water supply. Waters for agricultural use are directed to irrigation for various crops and livestock use, which have become a cornerstone of the economy in the surrounding municipalities. Livestock farming focuses on cattle, with an estimated population exceeding 20,000 heads. The irrigation zone covers a total area of 15,000 hectares.

=== Tourism and sports ===
The reservoir’s waters are also used for partial human contact in recreational areas, water sports, and sport, commercial, and subsistence fishing. The Cumaripa Reservoir Recreational Park has facilities suitable for sailing, jet skiing, and canoeing, and includes 9 cabins with barbecue areas for relaxation and enjoyment. The park is surrounded by a small concrete pathway used for jogging, cycling, or rollerblading. After 5 p.m., park security closes the gates for the safety of visitors. Windsurfing is commonly practiced in January. In the past, the reservoir hosted a sailing school. The park also features a beach volleyball court, metal benches, a playground, bolas criollas courts, a cafeteria, and restrooms.

=== Fishing ===
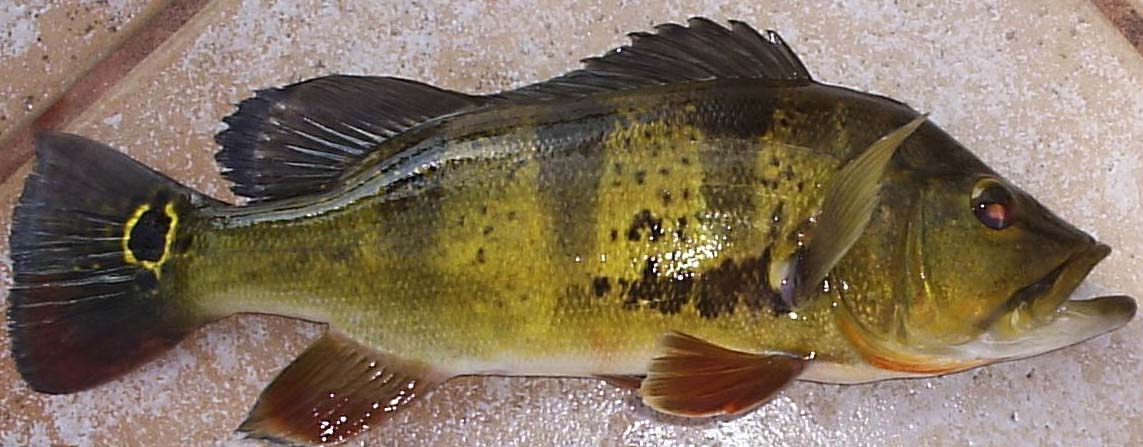
Sport fishing in the Cumaripa Reservoir is primarily based on peacock bass (Cichla ocellaris).

The lagoon supports sport fishing, mainly for peacock bass—typically caught with white, white/blue, and white/red surface lures, though breezes sometimes require mid-water lures. Wolf fish, John Dory, and tambaqui fishing has been reported, along with the presence of Characidae, Roeboides, Crenicichla, Astyanax, Petenia kraussii, Hypostomus plecostomus, Andinoacara pulcher, Geophagus surinamensis, and Poecilia sphenops. Both water sports and fishing require permits from the National Parks Institute (Inparques).

Fishing in Cumaripa can be done in various ways, with trolling slowly along the reservoir’s edge being the most successful. Casting mid-water lures, poppers, or propellers from a boat along the shores, retrieved without stopping to maintain fish interest, is another method. A variant involves casting lures in areas where the lake’s depth is no more than half a meter due to algae, or even among shrubs and mounds in the reservoir, in a casting style.

== Flow control ==
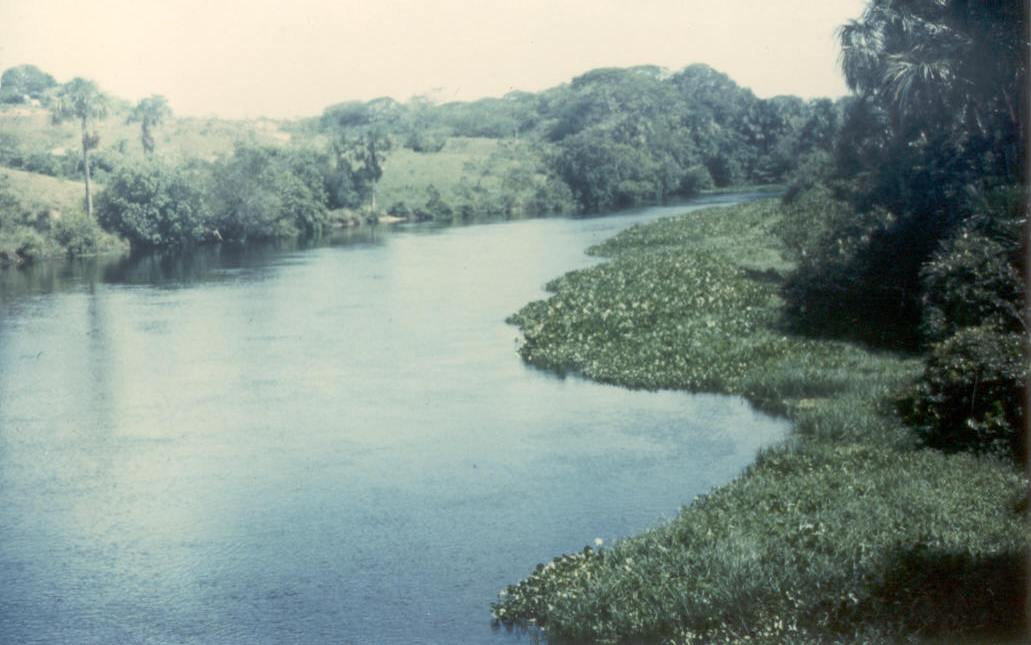
Yaracuy River, photo taken from Peñón Bridge, the location where the ecological flow of Cumaripa is measured.

Venezuelan policy stipulates that during the dry season, the Ministry of the Environment and Renewable Natural Resources is responsible for taking necessary measures to extract (except in cases of force majeure) the ecological flow required from the Cumaripa Reservoir to increase the flow of the Middle and Lower Yaracuy River to 4.0 m³/s, measured at Peñón Bridge.

== See also ==
- Exotic Tropical Flora Park
- Cerro María Lionza Natural Monument
