= Piedra La Tortuga Natural Monument =

Piedra La Tortuga Natural Monument Monumento Natural Piedra La Tortuga
- IUCN category III (natural monument or feature)
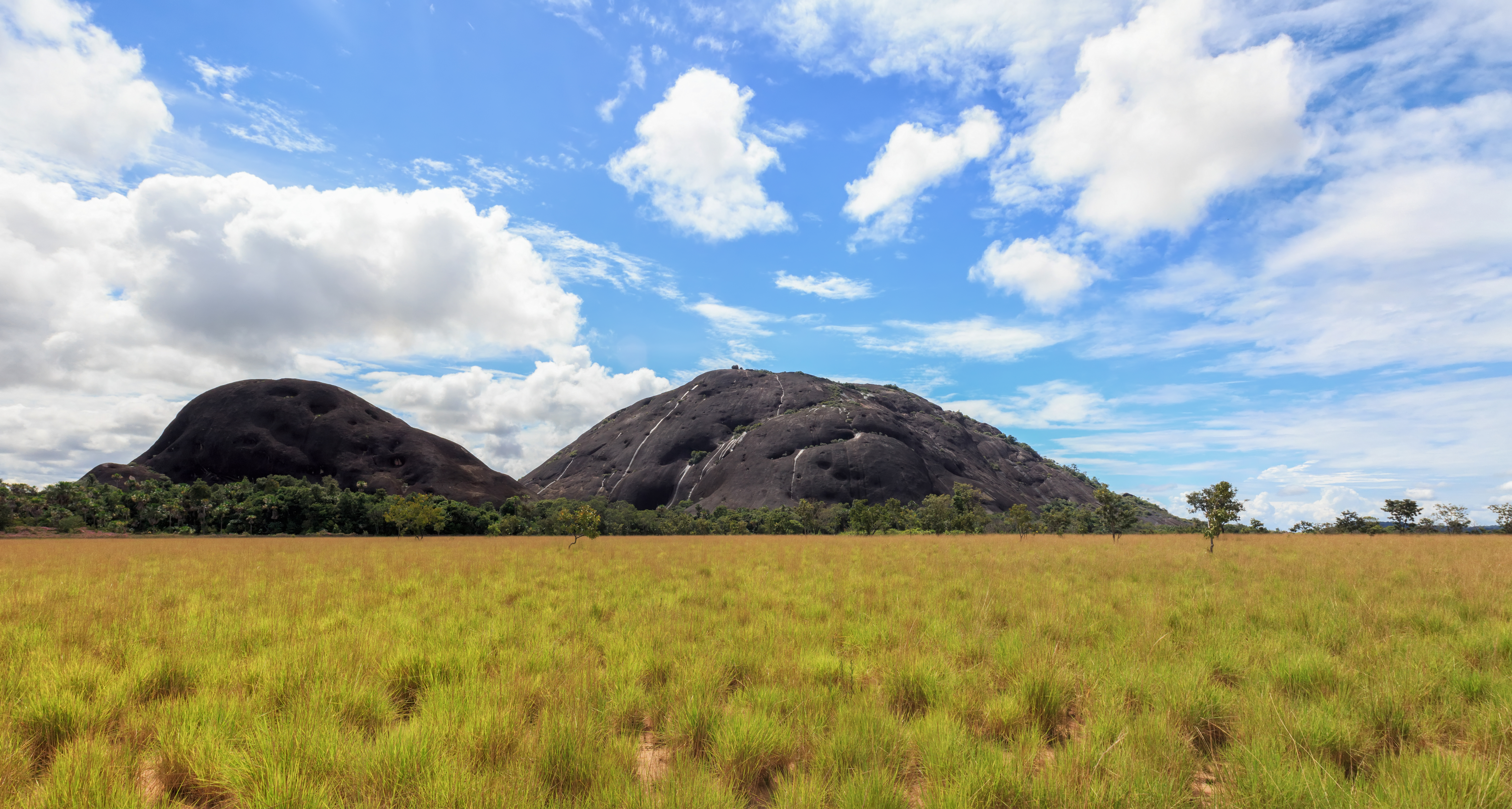

- Location within Venezuela
- Location: Venezuela
- Coordinates: 5°33′N 67°35′W
- Area: 5.25 km^{2} (2.03 sq mi)
- Established: 5 June 1992

The Piedra La Tortuga Natural Monument (Spanish: Monumento Natural Piedra La Tortuga) Also Piedra La Tortuga Is a protected natural space located in the Atures municipality, in the Amazonas state, in the south of Venezuela. Received the status of natural monument by decree No. 2.351 of 5 June 1992. Official Gazette No. 35089 of 11 November 1992.

== Monument ==
It is located 15 km, approximately from Puerto Ayacucho, heading South. Municipality Atures. Covering 525 hectares, it is home to two indigenous communities of the Hiwi (Guahiba) and Piaroa or Wothuhaethnic groups.

It consists of two granite outcrops of magmatic origin, belonging to the Serrania del Parhuaza, constituted by acid rocks of the Precambrian of magmatic origin, with an approximate age of 1,500 million years. Here is the largest petroglyph known in the country, as well as caves and cemeteries of ancient indigenous populations, with a great variety of cave paintings.

== Gallery ==
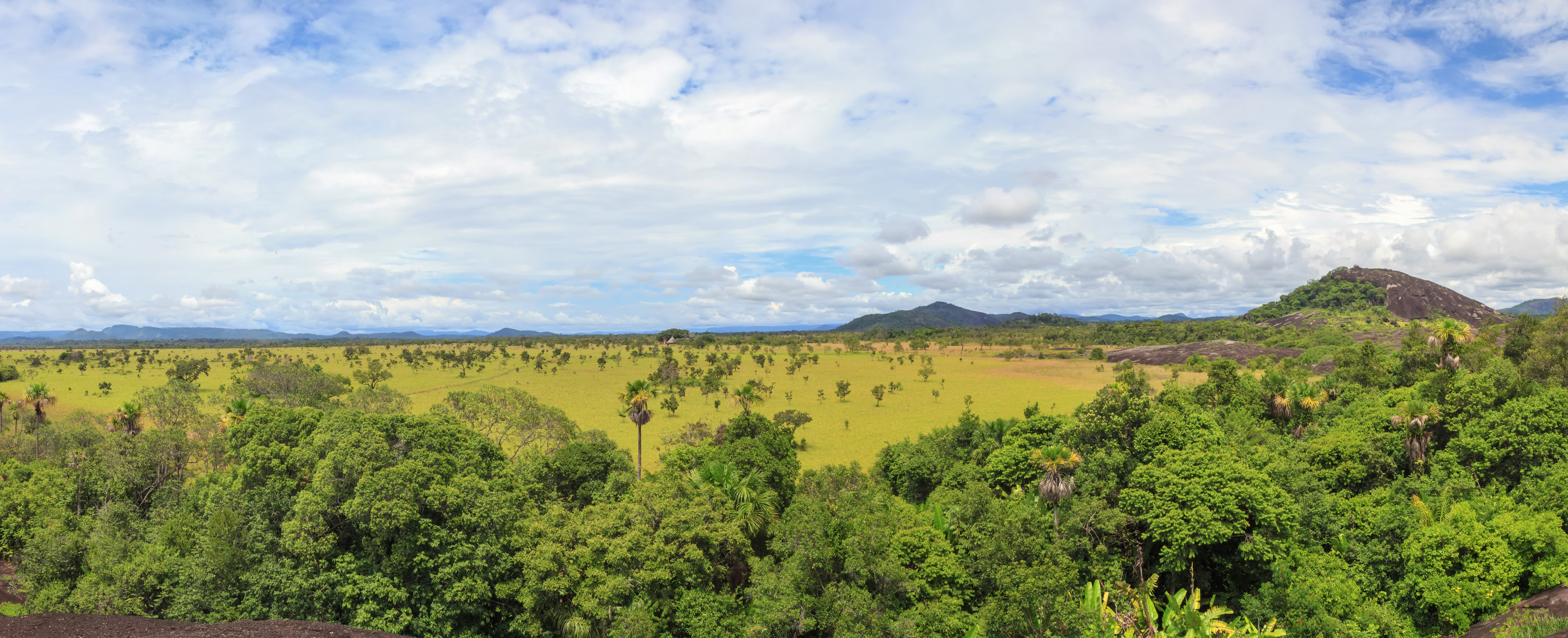
Panoramic view

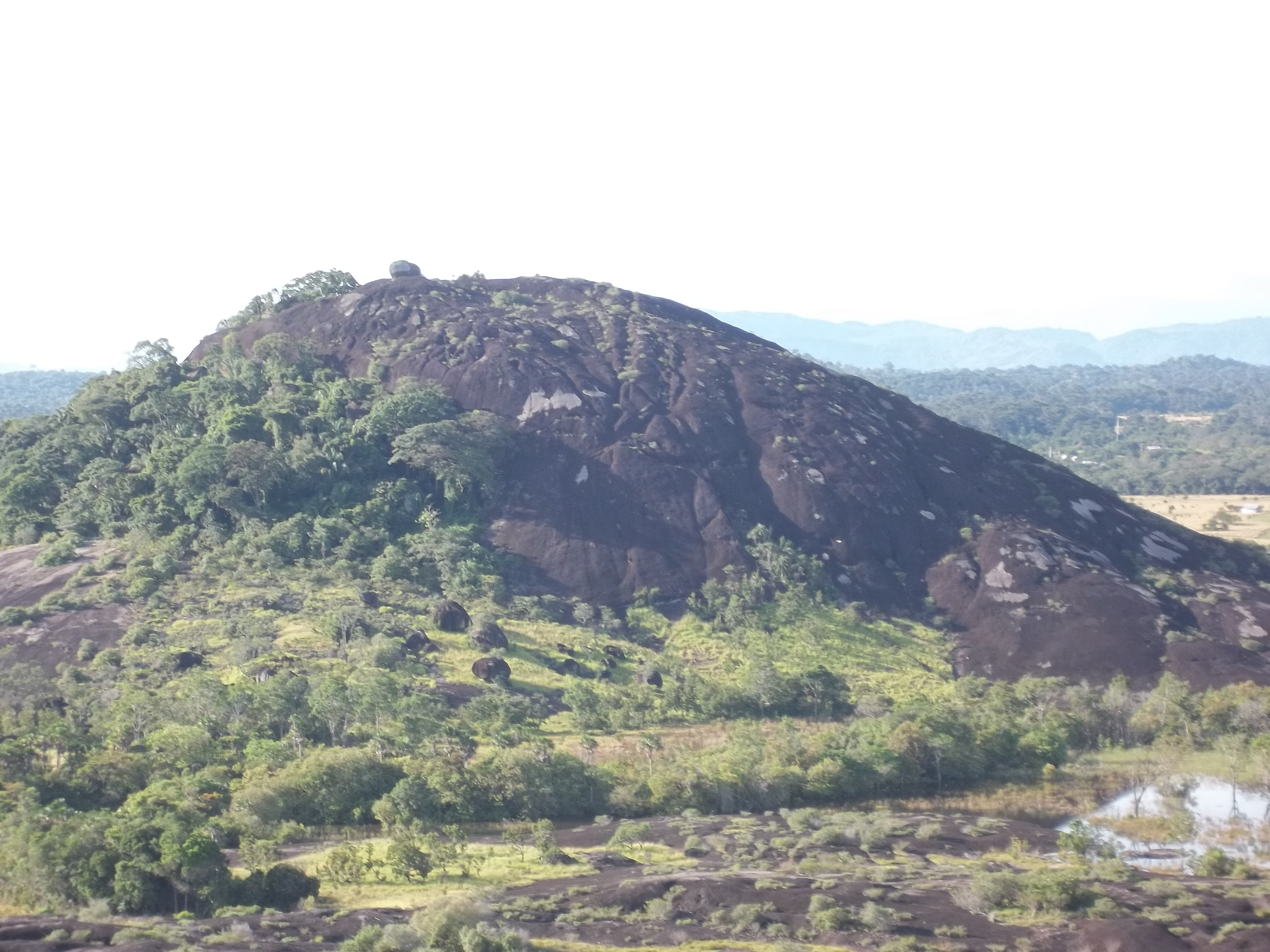

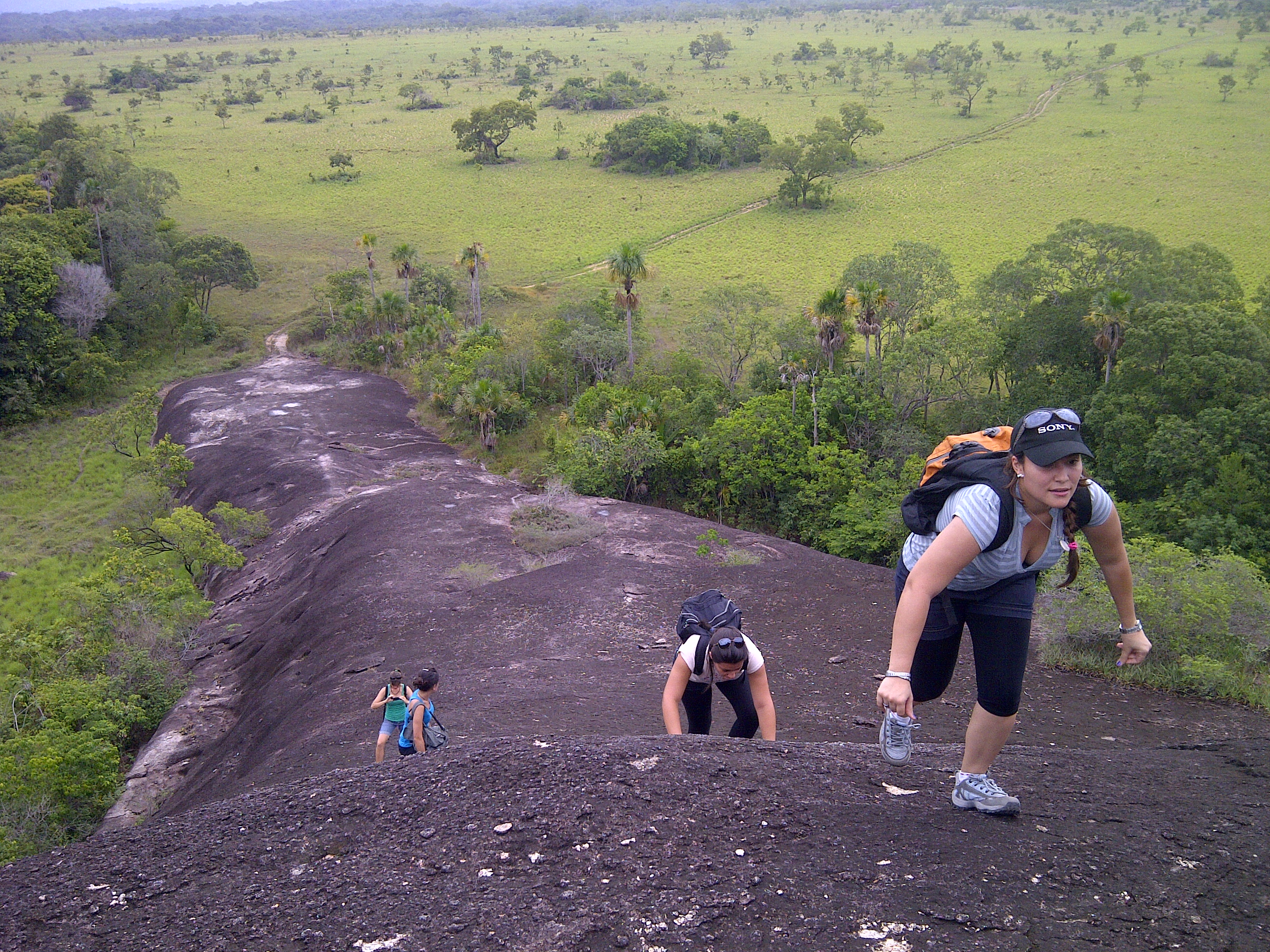
Walk to the monument

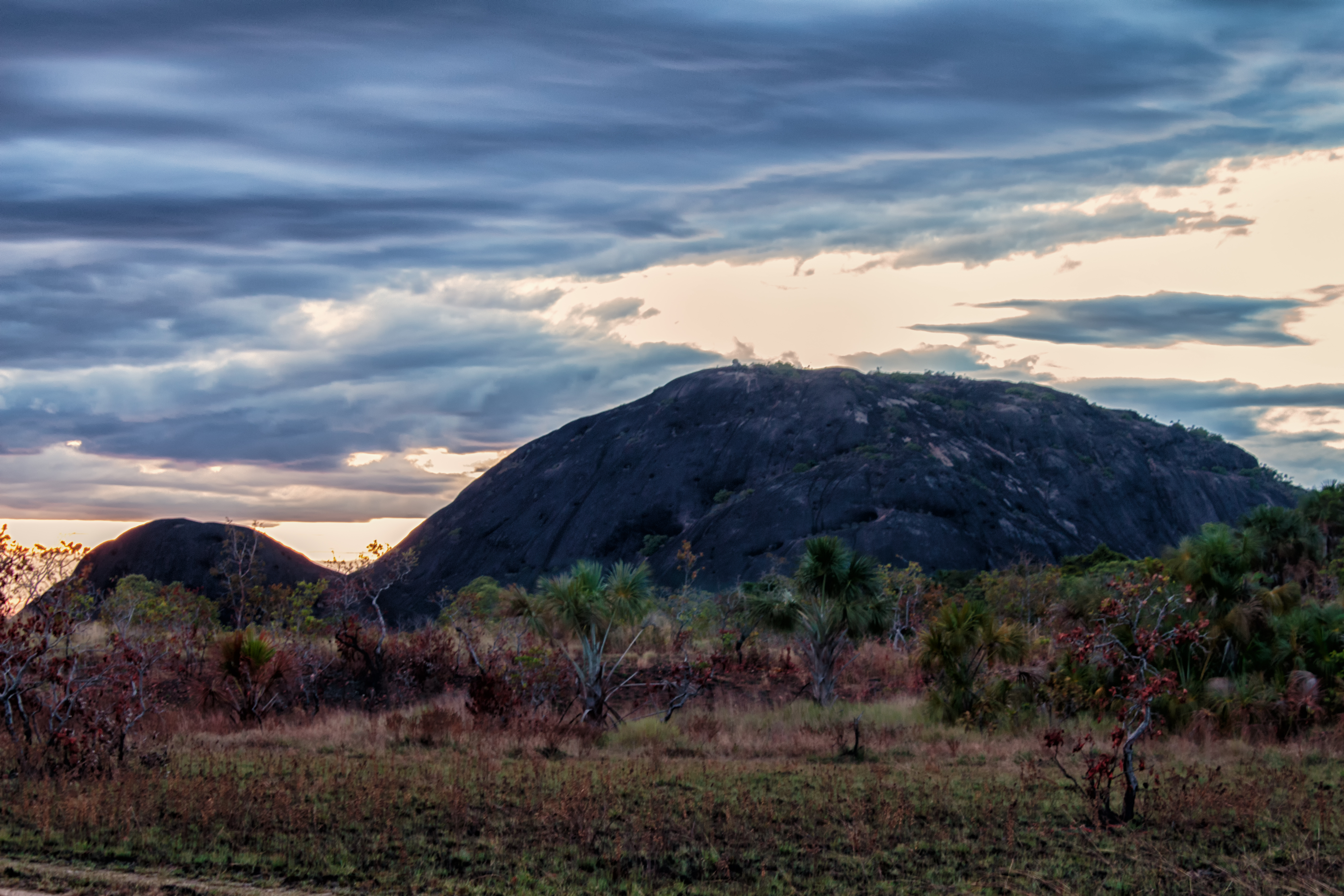

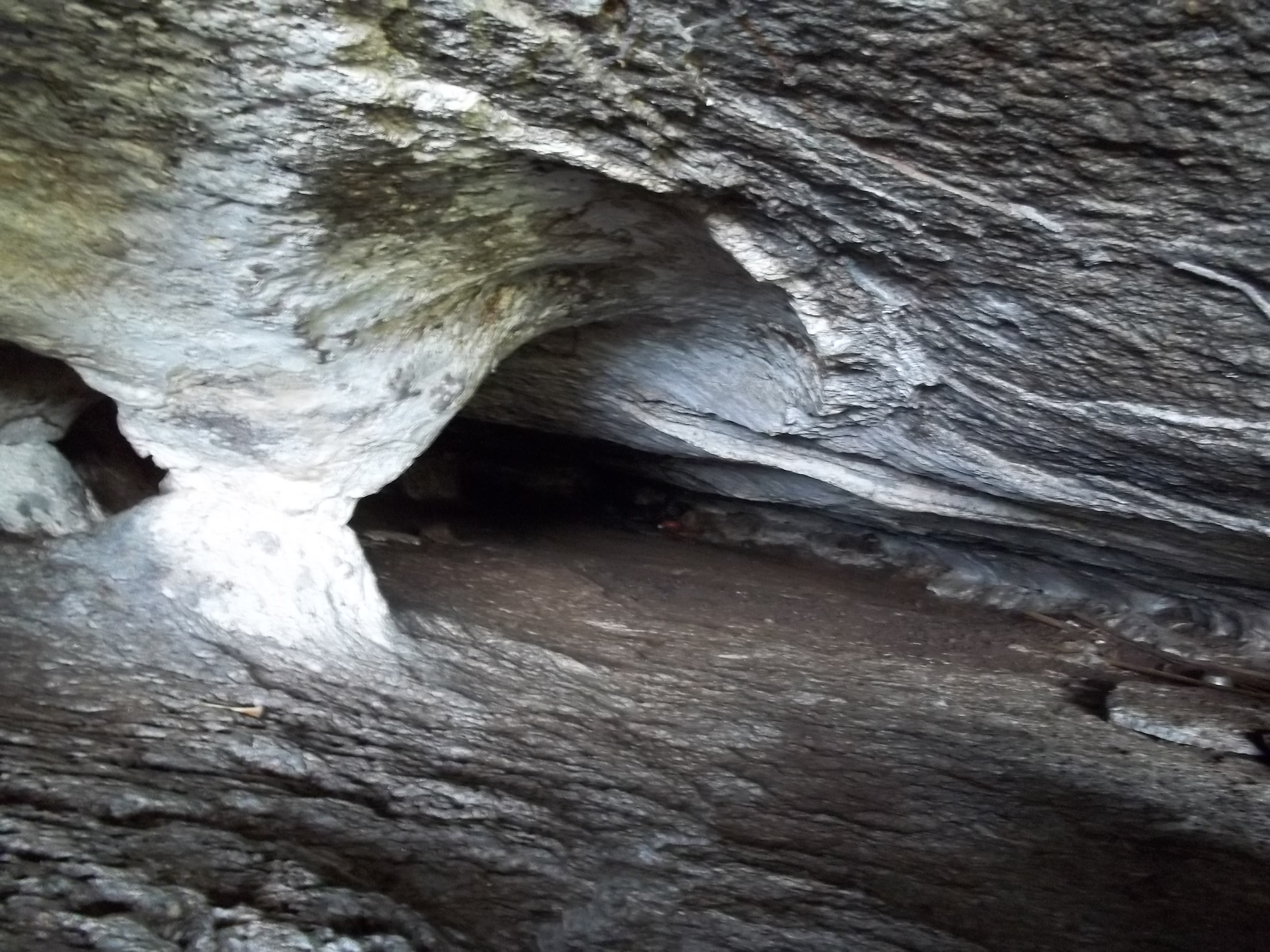
Caves

== See also ==
- List of national parks of Venezuela
- Piedra del Cocuy Natural Monument
