= Bruzual Municipality =

Bruzual Municipality Municipio Bruzual
- Municipality
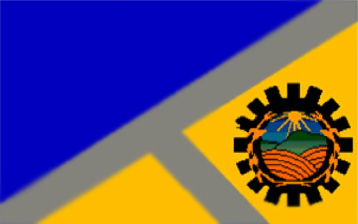
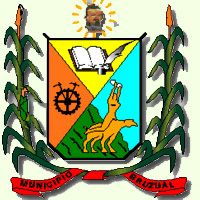
- Flag Coat of arms

- Location in Yaracuy

- Location in Venezuela
- Coordinates: 10°09′11″N 68°51′37″W
- Country: Venezuela
- State: Yaracuy
- Municipal seat: Chivacoa

Area
  - Total: 417.0 km^{2} (161.0 sq mi)

Population (2019 projection)
  - Total: 84,876
  - Density: 203.5/km^{2} (527.2/sq mi)
- Time zone: UTC−4 (VET)

Bruzual is one of the 14 municipalities of the state of Yaracuy, Venezuela. The municipality is located in southwestern Yaracuy, occupying an area of 417 km^{2} with a big majority of its 84,876 inhabitants, residing in the municipal seat of Chivacoa. The municipality was named in 1877 to honour Venezuelan liberal military officer Manuel Ezequiel Bruzual. Today, Bruzual is known for its agriculture, most notably holding the state's highest concentration of legume production. Additionally, the municipality contains the Cerro María Lionza Natural Monument, officially certified as Intangible Cultural Heritage of the Nation.

== Name ==
The Bruzual Municipality was named in 1877 to honor Manuel Ezequiel Bruzual, a prominent historical figure celebrated as a hero of both the Venezuelan War of Independence and the Federal War. Bruzual initially served in the Spanish army before switching sides to fight for independence under Generals Santiago Mariño and Carlos Soublette and later fought for the Liberal faction in the Federal War, served as Minister of War and Navy, and became provisional President of Venezuela in 1868 before being overthrown by the Revolución Azul and dying from battle wounds in Curaçao. Today, his memory is honored in the municipality by a local tribute bust located in the center of Plaza Bruzual, directly facing the Municipal Council.

== Economy ==
The Bruzual Municipality is known in the state of Yaracuy as having the highest concentration of legumes production, with 61% of the beans and 15.7% of the black beans. Also, the municipality is known as a grower of crops such as coffee, sugarcane, avocado, sweet potato, and bell pepper.

== Demographics ==
Based on the 2011 Venezuelan census, The population of the Bruzual Municipality was 74,345 people, accounting for 11.58% of the total population of the state of Yaracuy. It is the third most populated municipality and together with San Felipe, Peña, and Nirgua they compose 55.71% of the population of Yaracuy. A big majority of the population (75.5%) resides in Chivacoa, the municipal seat of the municipality.

By June 2019, official projections from the Venezuelan Statistics National Institute estimated the population of Bruzual as 84,876 people, representing an annual growth rate of 1.7% since 2011 and showing a population density of 203.5 inhabitants/km^{2}. However, these projections do not account for the impact of emigration linked to the country's recent economic and political circumstances.

The gender distribution of the population showed an even balance with 34,980 men (50.2%) and 34,752 women (49.8%). The age distribution showed that the largest segment of the population was aged 15 to 64, comprising 65.4% of the people. Younger people aged 0 to 14 made up 29% of the population, while those aged 65 and older accounted for the remaining 5.6%. The municipality is highly urbanized, with 89.8% of the inhabitants (62,641) living in urban centers compared to 10.2% (7,091) in rural areas.

Ethnically, the municipality identified as predominantly Mestizo (58.3%) and White people (36.6%). Minority groups included 4% Afro-Venezuelans and 1.1% belonging to other ethnic groups, with 31 individuals identifying as indigenous. The literacy rate was 94.2%, with 3,306 inhabitants of Bruzual not able to read or write.

== Culture ==
The Cerro María Lionza Natural Monument is located in the Bruzual Municipality, near Chivacoa. It serves as a major tourist and religious centre for the María Lionza movement. The monument was officially recognised by the Venezuelan government, with the Ministry of Culture formally certifying the Cult of María Lionza as Intangible Cultural Heritage of the Nation.
