= Alejandro Colina =

Venezuelan sculptor

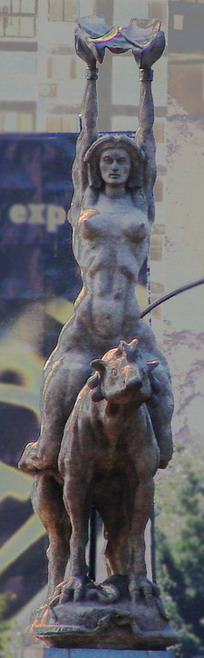
María Lionza, 1951, Caracas, Venezuela

Alejandro Colina (8 February 1901 – 1976) was a Venezuelan sculptor.

== Biography ==
Alejandro Colina, a Venezuelan sculptor, was born in Caracas on February 8, 1901. Colina is one of the greatest exponents of Venezuelan monumental sculpture and framed much of his work within the cultural heritage of indigenous communities, with their sculptures celebrating the myths, legends, gods and chieftains of the tribes in Venezuela. He died in 1976 at the age of 75 years. His most famous work is the 1951 statue depicting the goddess Maria Lionza.

Alejandro Colina's parents were Alejandro Torcuato Colina, from Falcón State; and Fermina Viera, a Spanish lady originally from Santa Cruz de Tenerife.

Colina began his artistic development at the Academy of Fine Arts in Caracas at 13 years old. For seventeen years he worked as a mechanic for merchant ships, and as such, traveled for more than a decade. In 1919, he returned to Caracas and began to study at the School of Arts and Crafts in Caracas, where his works were exhibited and he became the deputy director of the institute.

In 1920, Colina decided to leave Caracas and moved to La Guajira, in Zulia State, where he coexisted with the indigenous peoples of the West of the country for eight years. During this time, he was devoted to taking notes and studying the ways, customs and legends of the local communities. Colina returned to Caracas, powerfully influenced by his long cohabitation with the indigenous peoples, who were to become the main themes for his work. Once back in the capital, Colina married Alejandrina Issa, who gave birth to his two sons.

At the end of the 1920s, Colina began to develop the Monument to the Liberator: the sculptural work to which he would devote much of his life. In 1931, Colina became the assistant to the Venezuelan architect, Alejandro Chataing. In 1933, Colina created the sculpture Tacarigua Plaza, located in the Mariscal Sucre Air Base in the city of Maracay. Colina later faced accusation of being a Communist by the then president Juan Vicente Gómez, and was held at the Libertador Castle, Puerto Cabello, where in 1936 the poet Andrés Eloy Blanco was going to give a speech in occasion of the liberation of all political prisoners held by the Gómez dictatorship.

As the poet got aware of the presence of Alejandro Colina among the prisoners, he immediately took contact with his brother-in-law Pedro Sotillo, also a poet, and asked him to talk with the Venezuelan President López Contreras in order to transfer Colina to a Health Center, being that the Psychiatric Hospital of Caracas, managed at that moment by Dr. González Rincones who offered Colina posterior to his treatment the use a room in the same Psychiatric Hospital, where he could continue develop his art to overcome his depression. In that same room he created the mural "Arts, Science and Psychiatry" and twelve busts portraying patients neighbors, each representing a particular disease.

In 1936 he married Emilia Heredia Hurtado, with whom he had three children. Colina continued to work, this time on the statue of the Cacique Guacamaya, located at the Military School in Caracas, and the presentation of the model of the Monument to the Liberator, which he worked on for over twenty-five years and which would be located in top of Cerro Avila, a mountain overlooking the valley of Caracas.

In 1951 he created the famous sculpture of Maria Lionza, a goddess originating in the indigenous state of Yaracuy, who appears in the statue as a beautiful Venezuelan woman riding a tapir. Colina portrayed her as naked and voluptuous, with wide hips and strong musculature, seated on the tapir which is standing on a snake. Maria Lionza offers, in arms outstretched toward the sky, a female pelvis, representing fertility.

Also created in the 1950s were the matte black statues and busts of Caciques Tiuna, Manaure, and Yaracuy.

In 1964 Colina finished the statue of San Juan de Los Morros, and in 1967 the famous statue of the chief Caricuao, which marks the entrance to the crowded residential area of the same name, West of Caracas.

At the time of his death, Colina left unfinished the sculpted torso of Cacique Chacao, intended for the Plaza del Indio in the Chacao municipality, also in Caracas.

== See also ==
- Political prisoners in Venezuela
