= Exotic Tropical Flora Park =

Park in Venezuela

- Parque de la Exótica Flora Tropical
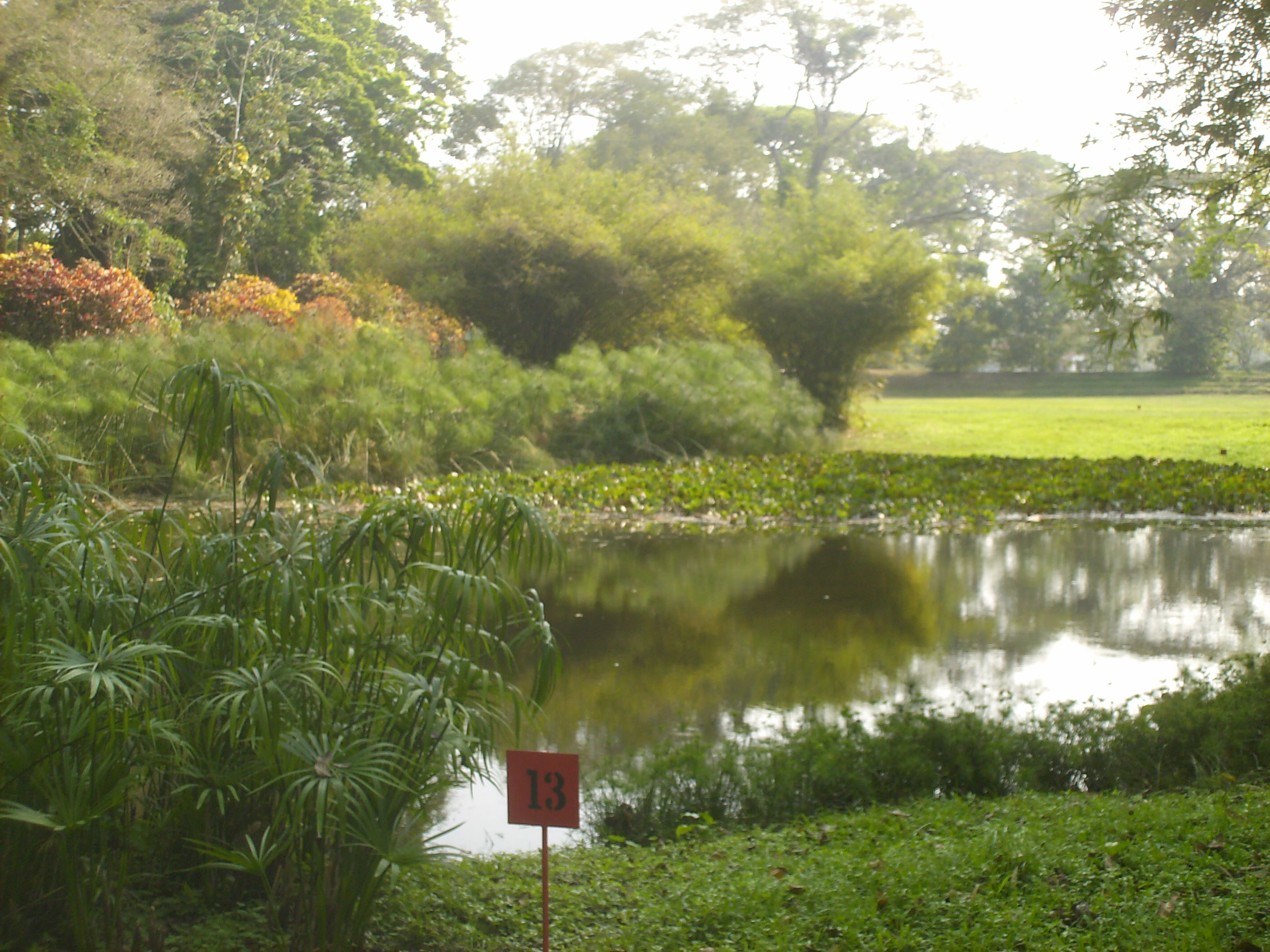
- Interactive map of Exotic Tropical Flora Park
- Type: Botanical garden
- Location: San Felipe, Yaracuy, Venezuela
- Coordinates: 10°20′15″N 68°41′52″W
- Area: 10.5 hectares (26 acres)
- Opened: 1996
- Website: www.hotelantiguamision.com.ve

The Exotic Tropical Flora Park (Spanish: Parque de la Exótica Flora Tropical; Parque de la Exótica Flora Tropical y Misión Nuestra Señora del Carmen) Also Exotic Tropical Flora Park and Our lady of Carmel Mission Is the name given to a complex formed by an old Catholic mission transformed into a museum, a Catholic chapel and a 10.5-hectare (26-acre) botanical garden with more than 2,500 varieties of plants from Colombia, Ecuador, Brazil, Panama, Nicaragua, Madagascar, Costa Rica, Thailand, Singapore, China and Australia, mainly heliconias, gingers, bromeliads and orchids arranged in a journey of 4.5 kilometers located in the valley of the Yaracuy River, in the homonymous state of Venezuela.

The tour of the park is led by an expert who usually explains the origin of each species of the walk or can also acquire a book with all the specifications and go taking their own notes while walking the route. The guides of the park also direct the option of practicing canopy walking, a discipline that consists of "walking" through the trees through a safe mechanism of harnesses and pulleys.

The fauna is as rich as the vegetation. The walk around the park is usually accompanied by araguatos (howler monkeys), butterflies, sloths, ducks, chigüires (capybara) and a great diversity of birds.

== Gallery ==
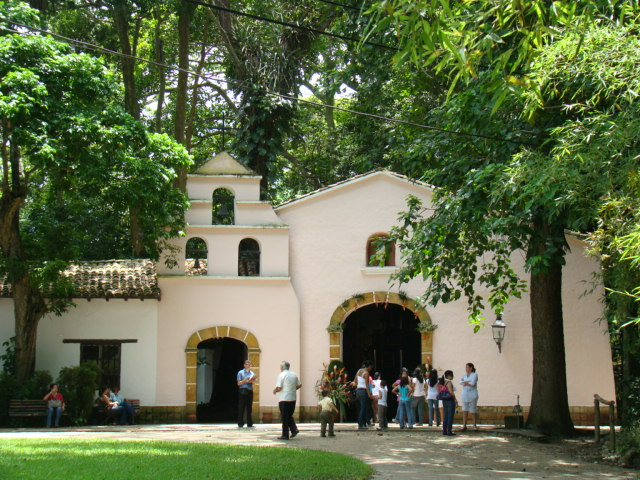

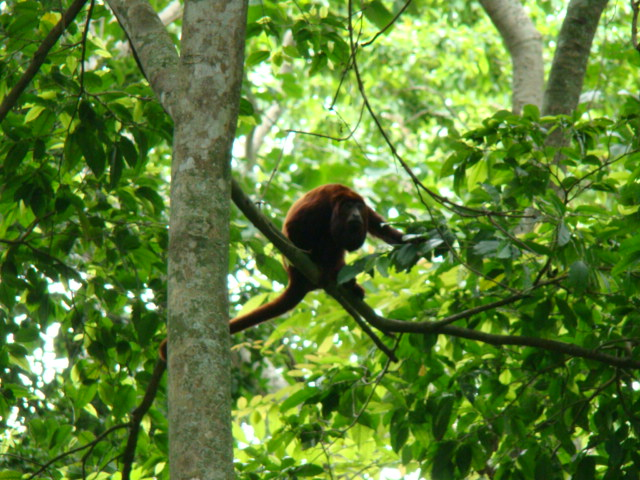

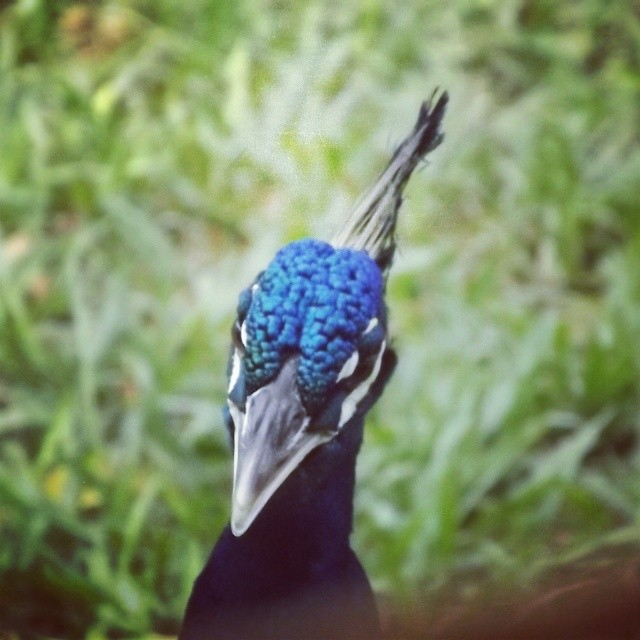

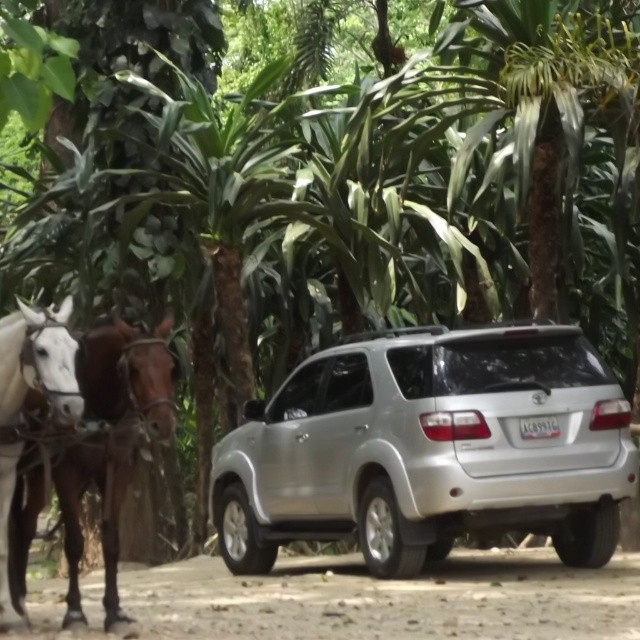

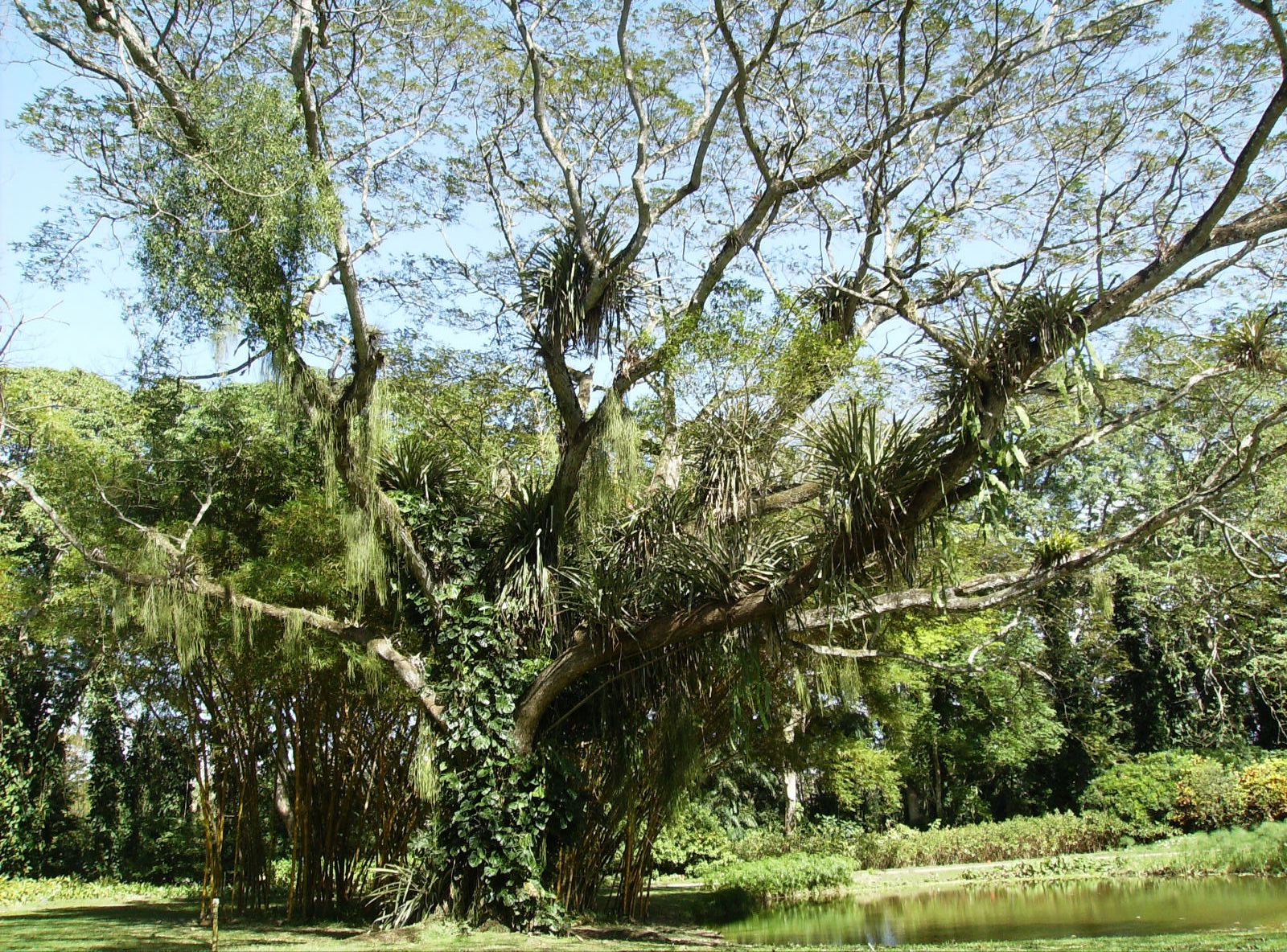

== See also ==
- Caracas Botanical Garden
- Botanical Garden of Mérida
- Cumaripa Reservoir Recreational Park
