= Cerro María Lionza Natural Monument =

Protected area of Venezuela

Cerro María Lionza Natural Monument Monumento Natural Cerro María Lionza
- IUCN category III (natural monument or feature)
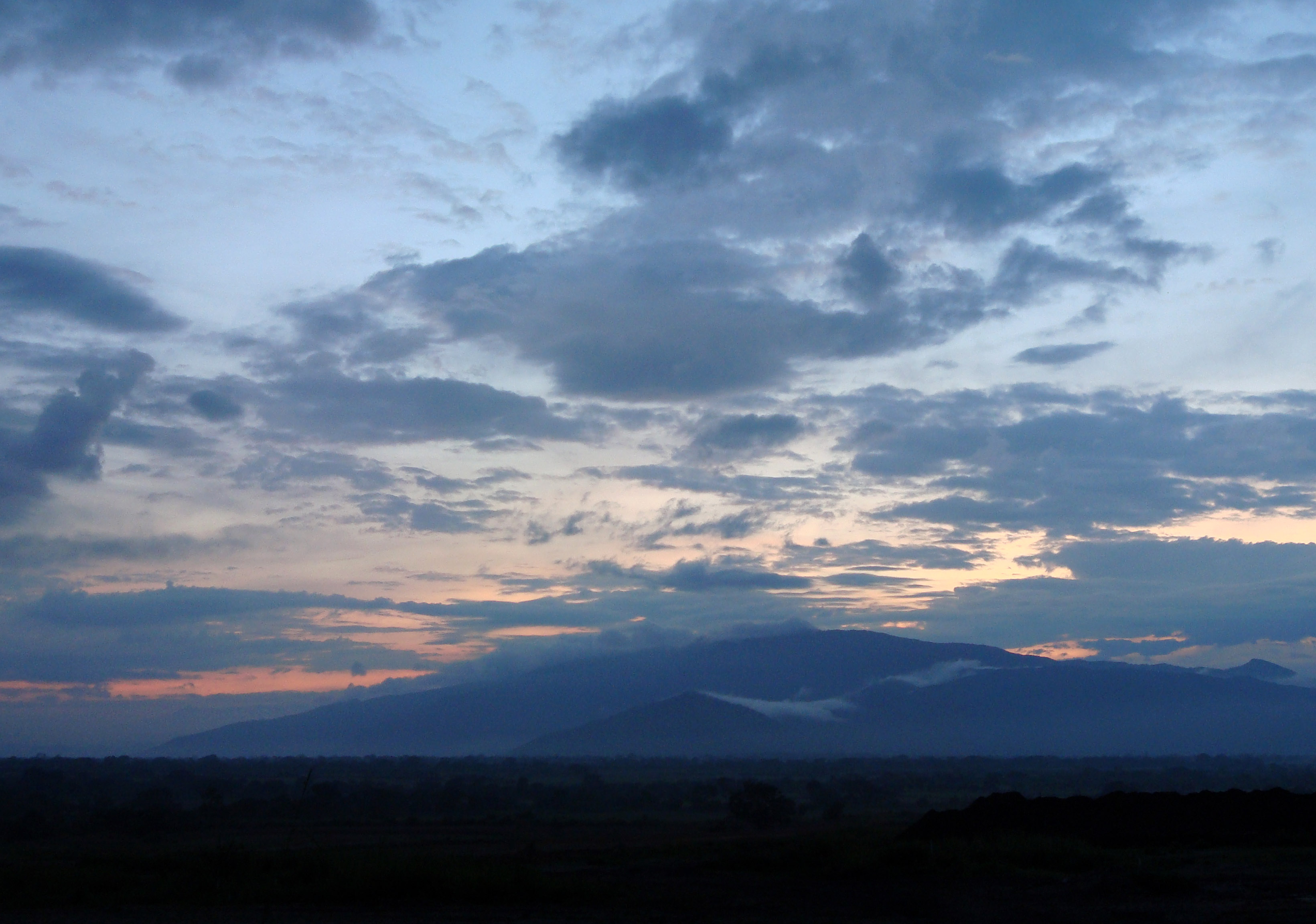

- Location within Venezuela
- Location: Venezuela
- Coordinates: 10°04′N 68°57′W
- Area: 117.12 km^{2} (45.22 sq mi)
- Established: March 18, 1960

The Cerro María Lionza Natural Monument (Spanish: Monumento Natural Cerro María Lionza), also Montaña de Sorte Natural Monument Is a protected area with the status of a natural monument that is formed by a mountainous massif from which the river Yaracuy, Chorro and Charay are born, which together with the rivers Gurabao, Buria, Turbio and others, from which the reservoir of The Majaguas. This Monument is located within the Tropical Humid Forest Life Zone in Yaracuy State in northern Venezuela. It is named after the indigenous goddess María Lionza.

The Government of Rómulo Betancourt (1958-1963), declared monument this space on March 18, 1960. But it was only in 1993 when it published in the Official Gazette (No. 4525) the Ordering Plan and Regulation of Use of it.

The Natural Monument Cerro María Lionza is in the mountainous complex that forms the Massif de Nirgua, pertaining to the Mountainous System of the Caribbean. The area is located in the jurisdiction of the municipalities Bruzual, Urachiche, Páez and Nirgua of the Yaracuy state, at a distance of approximately 6 km from the town of Chivacoa.

== See also ==
- List of national parks of Venezuela
- Aristides Rojas Natural Monument
- María Lionza (statue)
- Cumaripa Reservoir Recreational Park
