= María Lionza (statue) =

Monumental sculpture in Caracas

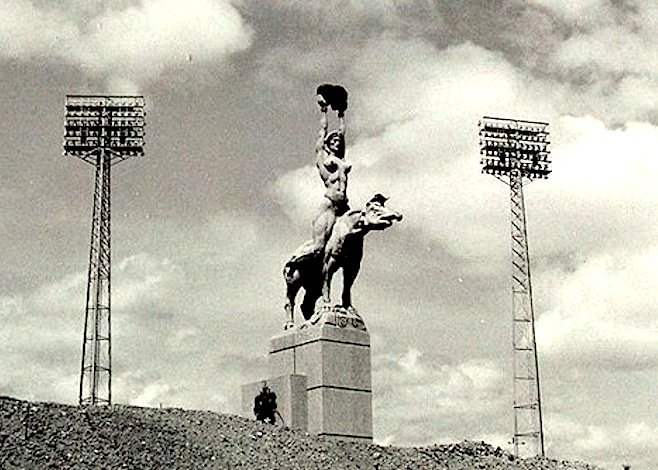
- The original on the campus in 1952
- Artist: Alejandro Colina
- Year: 1951
- Medium: faux stone (original), plaster (replica)
- Dimensions: 5.9 m × 1.2 m × 3.74 m (19' 4.25" in × 3' 11.25" in × 12' 3.25" in)
- Location: Caracas, Venezuela (replica); Quibayo, Yaracuy, Venezuela (original); 10°29′34.8″N 66°53′05.1″W
- Owner: Central University of Venezuela (de jure)

María Lionza is a large statue depicting the titular goddess, María Lionza, riding a tapir. The original is located on Sorte mountain in Yaracuy, said to be the goddess' home. A replica is located between lanes of the Francisco Fajardo freeway next to the University City campus of the Central University of Venezuela, in Caracas. The original was created by Alejandro Colina in 1951 to sit outside the university's Olympic Stadium for that year's Bolivarian Games; it was moved to the highway in 1953 and, after several years in storage with the replica on display in its place, was illicitly relocated to Sorte in 2022. The replica is a cast made by Silvestre Chacón in 2004; it has received generally negative reactions, and its construction damaged the original. It remains on the highway, while another replica is also at Sorte.

Colina often depicted indigenous figures like María Lionza, and it is said to be his most famous sculpture. In the statue, the goddess is shown nude, which is unusual for representations of her. Nevertheless, the statue, and versions of it, are worshiped by her followers.

== Background ==
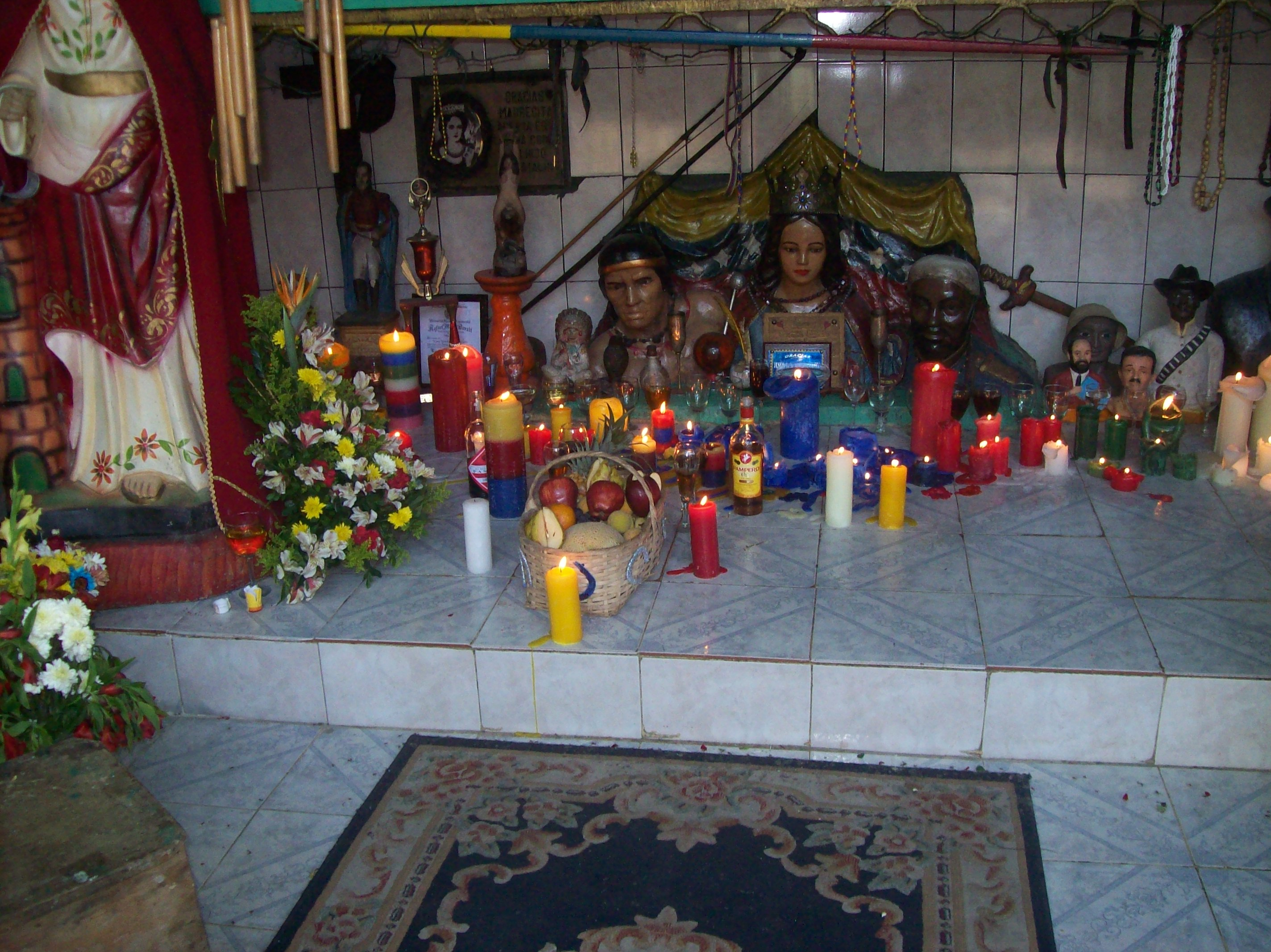
An altar to María Lionza; she is depicted centrally as a mestizo queen

The statue is of Venezuelan goddess María Lionza, a cult figure and nature goddess from Yaracuy; the artist, Alejandro Colina, made many sculptures based on indigenous folklore. In the 1920s he spent eight years living in some of western Venezuela's indigenous communities, and later chose to depict related iconography in his monumental sculptures. According to Venezuelan folklorist Gilberto Antolínez, in the 1940s Colina was also involved in a movement to mythologize María Lionza. Antolínez recalled: "In 1939 we created a social movement aimed at extolling the ancestral values of Venezuela. I myself, the sculptor Alejandro Colina, and the architect Hermes Romero joined together in a group [...] We organized a series of conferences and popularizing events and [...] used such occasions to 'mythologize' María Lionza, both in her legend and in the sculpture that nowadays stands on the main Caracas highway".

Social anthropologist Roger Canals, who directed the 2016 film A goddess in motion: María Lionza in Barcelona, noted that in the religious cult of María Lionza, idols were not traditionally used, with most worship occurring in natural spots up to the early 20th century. María Lionza's followers grew in number the 1950s, and so depictions of her increased. Though the depictions of her in rituals and on altars vary, the most common are either that of her face, showing a fair-skinned mestizo queen, or an image based on Colina's statue, depicting an indigenous Venezuelan.

== Construction and location ==
=== Olympic Stadium ===
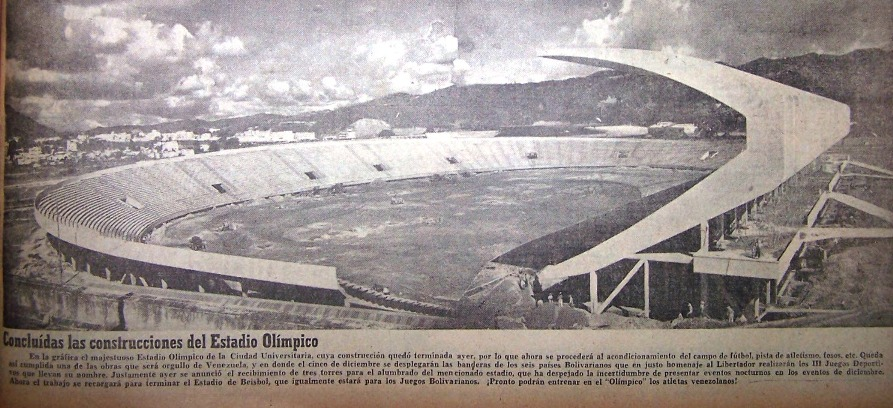
The newly-completed Olympic Stadium at the outset of the 1951 Bolivarian Games

The monumental statue was originally made to sit outside the Central University of Venezuela (UCV)'s Olympic Stadium for the 1951 Bolivarian Games; during the Bolivarian Games, the Olympic flame was held in the pelvis at the top of the statue. There is another monumental statue, Francisco Narváez' El Atleta, that is also located by the Olympic Stadium and was made in 1951. Unlike the other works of art at the university, which were part of the modernist Synthesis of the Arts movement under the design of architect Carlos Raúl Villanueva, the statue of María Lionza was commissioned by the dictator Marcos Pérez Jiménez, who wanted to make her a symbol of Venezuela. Villanueva had not wanted the statue in the campus, as it was not in line with his design principles.

=== Francisco Fajardo freeway ===
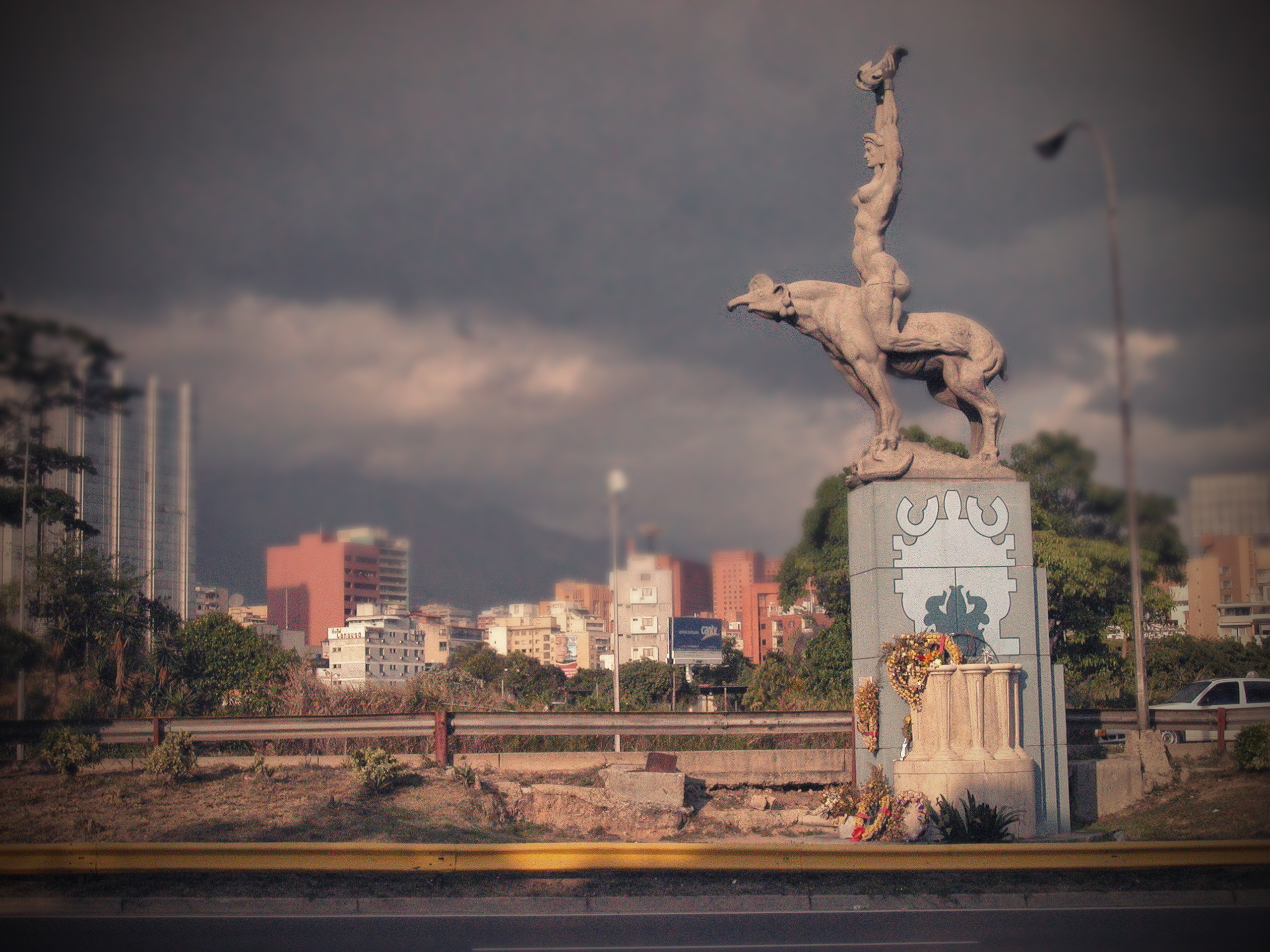
The replica alongside the highway in 2006

In the years after the Bolivarian Games, with the expansion of the city, the road system was made larger and the new Francisco Fajardo freeway passed closely around the campus near the stadium. In 1953 the statue was moved a short distance to its prominent location on the highway. The university had been asking for it to be removed, aware of the growing cult status of María Lionza and fearing that rituals would begin to be performed by her followers on campus grounds. Pérez Jiménez shared the concern: though he had elevated her to a national symbol, his dictatorship followed the Catholic Church and heavily persecuted other belief systems under a law enacted against paganism. As he did not want the symbol of María Lionza to become an icon of a religious cult, he ordered the statue to be moved to what was believed to be an inaccessible and dangerous location, between lanes in the center divide of the busy highway. The Guardian reported in 2019 that while the Catholic Church of Venezuela still disapproves of the indigenous religion, it "has long since abandoned its attempts to suppress it".

Though located just outside of the university, the statue is generally seen as part of the campus environs. It is under the authority of the university, and is protected as part of the campus World Heritage Site.

=== Sorte mountain ===
On 2 October 2022, the Institute of Cultural Heritage (IPC) removed the original statue from storage, apparently doing so without the knowledge or permission of the university; on 3 October, UCV and the Scientific, Criminal and Criminalistic Investigation Service Corps (CICPC) forensic police announced on social media that the statue had gone missing. The IPC, a government agency, quickly admitted to taking the statue, explaining they did so to "protect, preserve and relocate the statue... in accordance with its historical, [national cultural] and spiritual significance"; Ernesto Villegas, Minister of Culture, accused the university of having "virtually kidnapped" the sculpture years before. The Venezuelan Federation of Spiritualism said that the statue would be placed at the foot of Sorte mountain, a spiritual home of the religion, where another replica is already located; the IPC only wanted it to be on public display, though requested it be moved to the forest area where the María Lionza legend originated. Runrunes reported that the statue arrived in Yaracuy on 4 October, received with a celebration dedicated to the goddess, with El País saying that the statue had been moved to Quibayo, on Sorte mountain, in time for the 12 October worship day.

== Appearance ==
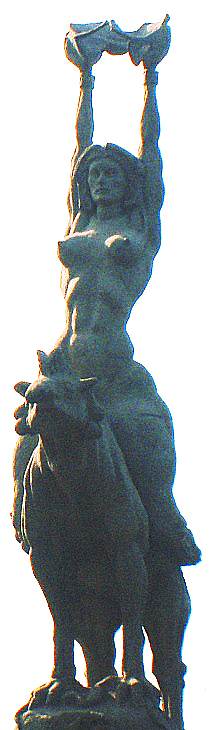
Front detail

The statue depicts the indigenous Venezuelan fertility goddess María Lionza nude and holding a woman's pelvis in both hands high above her head while riding astride a tapir that stands on a snake. The faux stone statue stands at 5.9 × 1.2 × 3.74 metres (19' 4.25" × 3' 11.25" × 12' 3.25"), excluding the pedestal. Followers of María Lionza believe that Colina did not artistically create the image of the goddess on the tapir for the statue, but that he "had a vision" of her in this position and, "during the vision, the goddess gave him the mission of creating a statue reproducing her appearance".

The Chicana/o studies professor and ethnologist Maria Herrera-Sobek explains that the statue draws on the 'Yara' identity of the goddess (who is known by different names with different stories), representing fertility. Discussing the iconography of the statue, she wrote that the depiction in nude and riding the tapir "represents female strength and courage, the essence of a woman warrior".

Canals wrote that other depictions of María Lionza, those used in public rituals and often made from mannequins, are typically fully clothed and are given much make-up and careful hair styling. He said that these clothed depictions are designed to emphasize María Lionza's sexuality and make her look like a fairy tale princess, contrasting them with Colina's statue. According to him, the statue is more sensual and erotic than the depictions of María Lionza as the mestizo queen, due to the nudity, and deliberately contrasts the feminine María Lionza with the masculine represented by the tapir, but still shows "a woman with a serious face, an athletic body with powerful legs and strong arms".

== Replacement ==
The work is protected by the university's artwork commission for the University City of Caracas campus World Heritage Site. In 2004, a replica was commissioned by the council of the City of Caracas so that the original statue could be protected. The replica was made by Silvestre Chacón. However, during the process of casting the replica, the original was significantly damaged; it has since been repaired by restorer Fernando de Tovar, who described the replica as "ridiculous". Despite the repair and calls to put the original back on display, until 2022 it was kept locked in a workshop at UCV. While the original was being repaired, the Caracas council had fought and lost a legal battle with the university to assume care of it; in response, then-mayor Freddy Bernal placed the replica on the highway pedestal before the university could reinstate the original. Between then and the illicit removal of the statue in 2022, the rivalry of ownership and the ideological significance of the statue intensified. The Institutional Assets and Monuments of Venezuela project wrote that objections to the replacement suggest that because the original statue is the one that holds heritage value, it is the one that the public should be able to appreciate. Followers of María Lionza also debated the benefits of returning the statue to its original location on the campus; some members of the university and the government instead wanted to move the statue further away from the city center. Another replica was installed at Chivacoa, near Sorte mountain, in 2006.

The two replicas
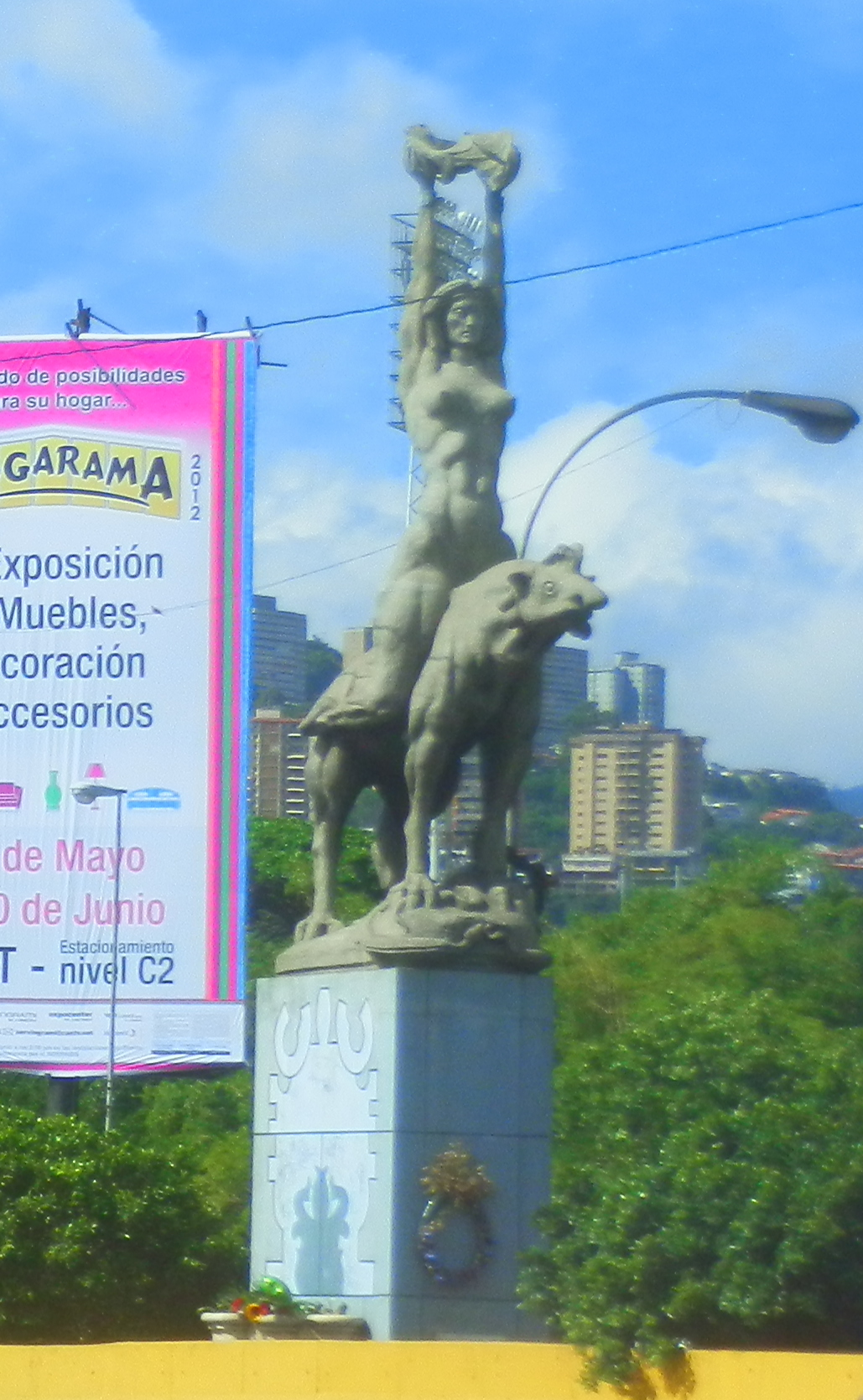
The first replica in Caracas in 2012

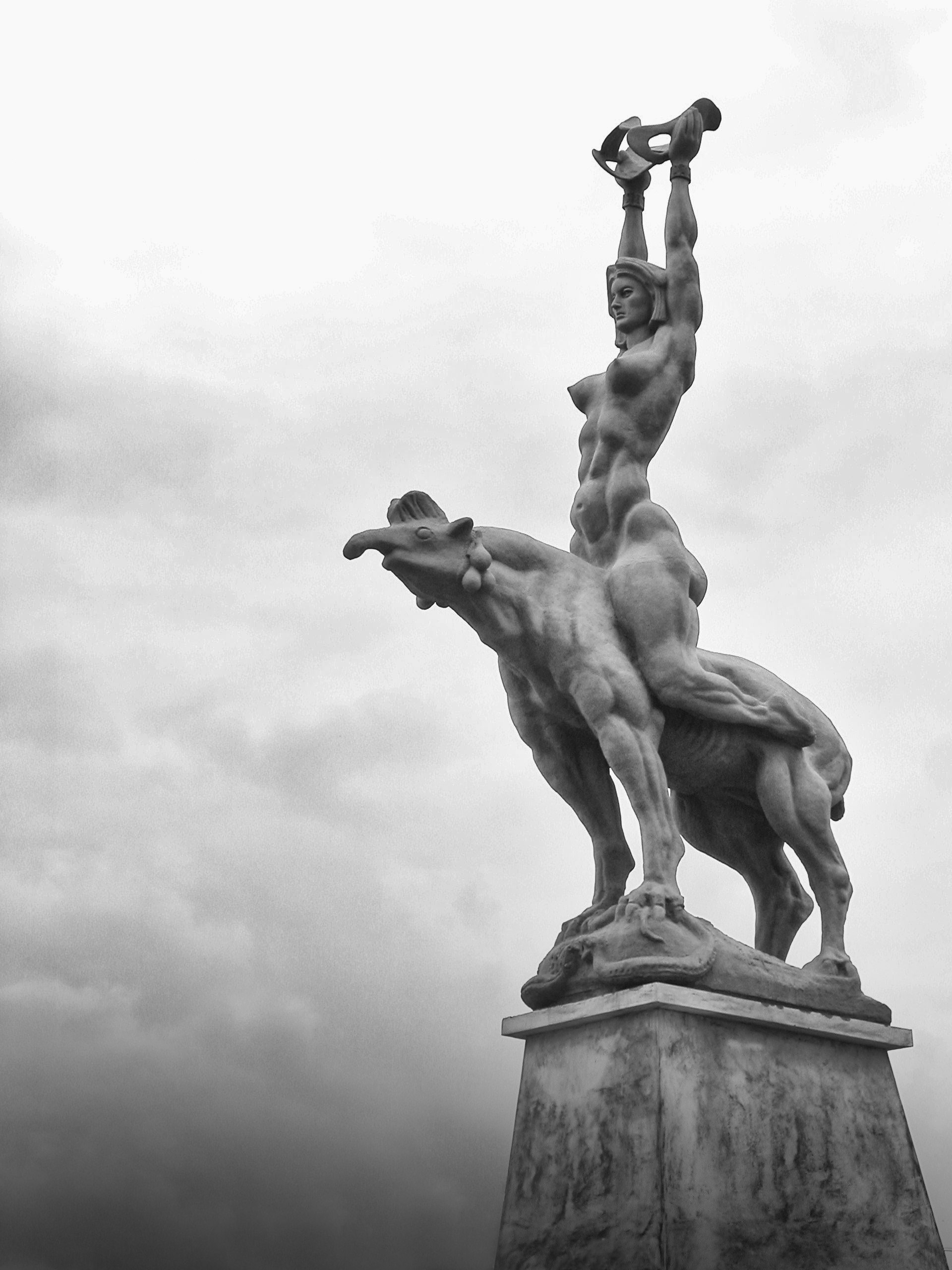
The second replica in Chivacoa in 2020

== Legacy ==
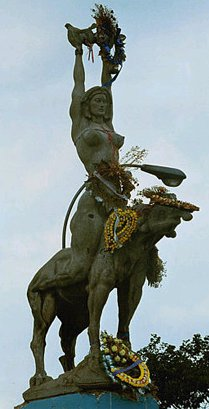
The statue in 2003, decorated with tributes

The statue quickly became an icon of Caracas, impressing both the elite of the city and its artistic circles, as well as María Lionza's followers. The followers began leaving tributes at the statue in the 1960s, and many copies are made in miniature to be placed on altars. Even as a replica, it is still given many tributes: in 2012, Herrera-Sobek wrote that "no day passes without lit candles and flowers appearing at the bottom of the sculpture", though it is dangerous to place them there due to the busy highway.

In discussion of the miniature replicas created by María Lionza's followers, Canals said that these idols are less detailed but also more erotic, which he explained is part of a process of goddess sexualization (done by exaggerating typically feminine features) seen in many religious cults. Clothes are also put on them in some instances out of respect for the divine, though Canals writes that this explicitly acknowledges the sexual nature by shrouding it.

In popular culture, the statue has been the inspiration for works of literature. In the 1990s, the statue was used as the cover for a series of poetry collections called The Goddess, with each edition containing a dedication to María Lionza and "her metaphor – a queen, naked, exuberant, who roams the countryside mounted on a tapir". The statue also forms a major symbolic plot point in the 2009 Margaret Mascarenhas novel The Disappearance of Irene Dos Santos. Panamanian musician Rubén Blades wrote a song about the goddess that mentions the statue.

In 2001, it was the inspiration for distinguished poet Yolanda Pantin's poem "The pelvic bone"; in the poem, the narrator travels into Caracas for a protest and sees the statue. The image of the pelvis – its "most notable feature" – stays in the narrator's mind, and the poem goes on to address the statue directly. In their book, Venezuela experts David Smilde and Daniel Hellinger write that, in Pantin's poem, the statue is seen to represent María Lionza as the mother of the nation, and the pelvis represents its symbolic birth. They also note that the narrator is a non-believer in terms of María Lionza, but is still drawn in by the statue and refers to it with familiarity, as well as speaking collectively, suggesting that all Venezuelans see her as their goddess and a symbol of hope in a broken nation. This imagery is reiterated later in the poem with a ray of light shining through the pelvis onto the protesters.

== See also ==
- List of artworks in University City of Caracas
- Media related to Statue of María Lionza in Caracas at Wikimedia Commons
