= Aristides Rojas Natural Monument =

Aristides Rojas Natural Monument Monumento Natural Arístides Rojas
- IUCN category III (natural monument or feature)
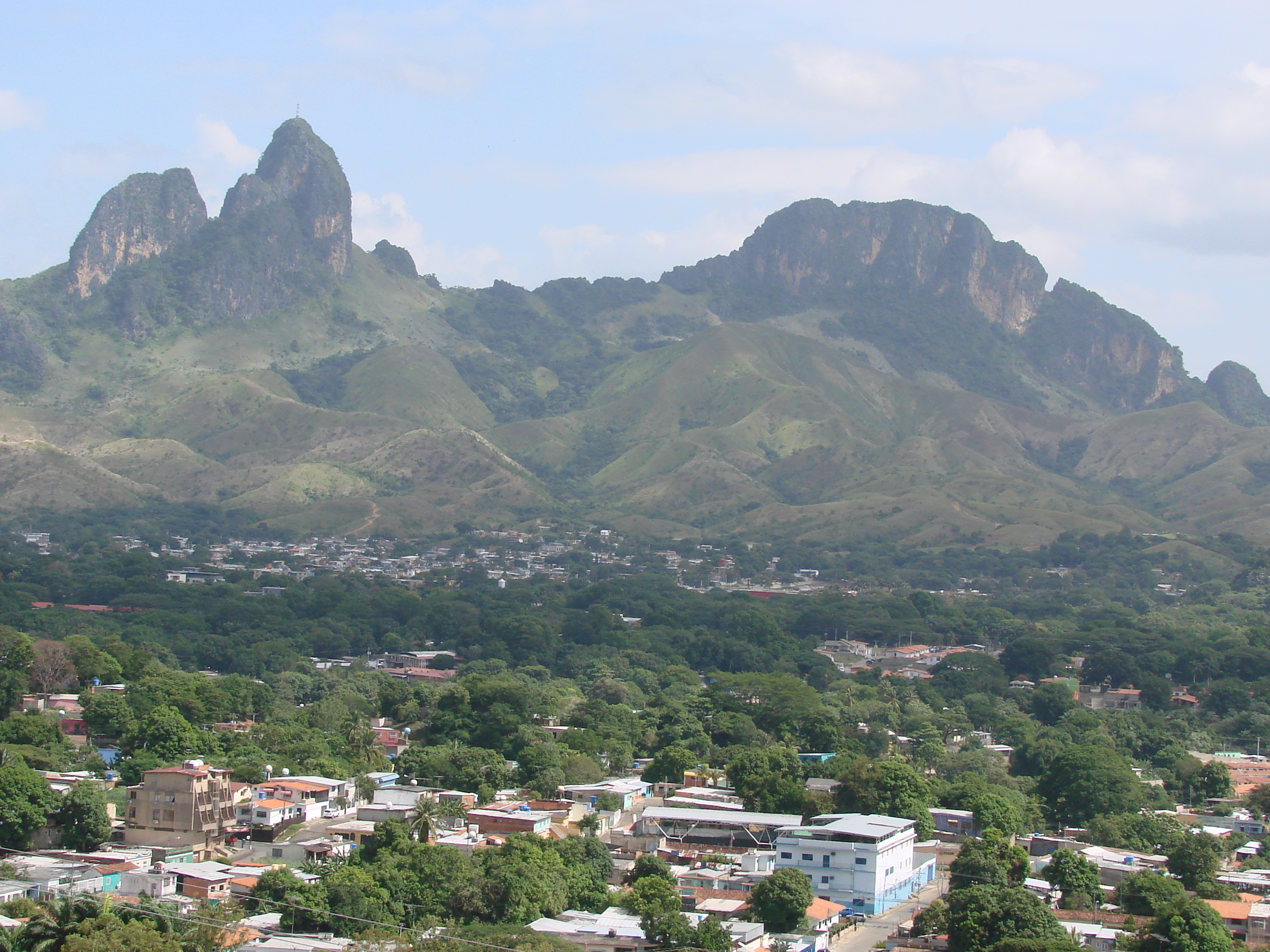

- Location within Venezuela
- Location: Venezuela
- Coordinates: 9°55′N 67°24′W
- Area: 27.75 km^{2} (10.71 sq mi)
- Established: November 11, 1949

The Arístides Rojas Natural Monument (Spanish: Monumento Natural Arístides Rojas) Also Morros de San Juan Is a protected natural space located in the Guárico state in the north-center of the South American country of Venezuela. It is a system of limestone rock formed by the deposition of marine sediments. It is located in the neighborhood of San Juan de Los Morros.

From its highest point you can see the city in a panoramic view. It was declared a natural monument in 1949 are located in the northwest of Guárico, in the vicinity of San Juan de los Morros, capital of the Guárico state. Taking the regional highway of the center are to 2 hours of Caracas. It is about hills of reef limestone rocks that rise in a toothed form which had their evolution when an ancient sea covered this area 80 million years ago. It presents the formation of numerous caves of small size.

Its main attraction is the hills, geological formations that rise up to 1,060 meters, consisting of reef limestone dating 80 million years ago. There visitors often practice climbing, a sport for which there are several schools in the town of San Juan, who are responsible for making the transfers and training necessary for such activity.

== Gallery ==
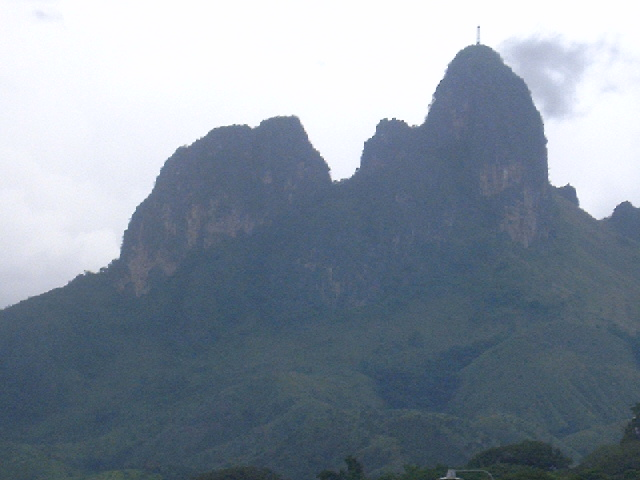

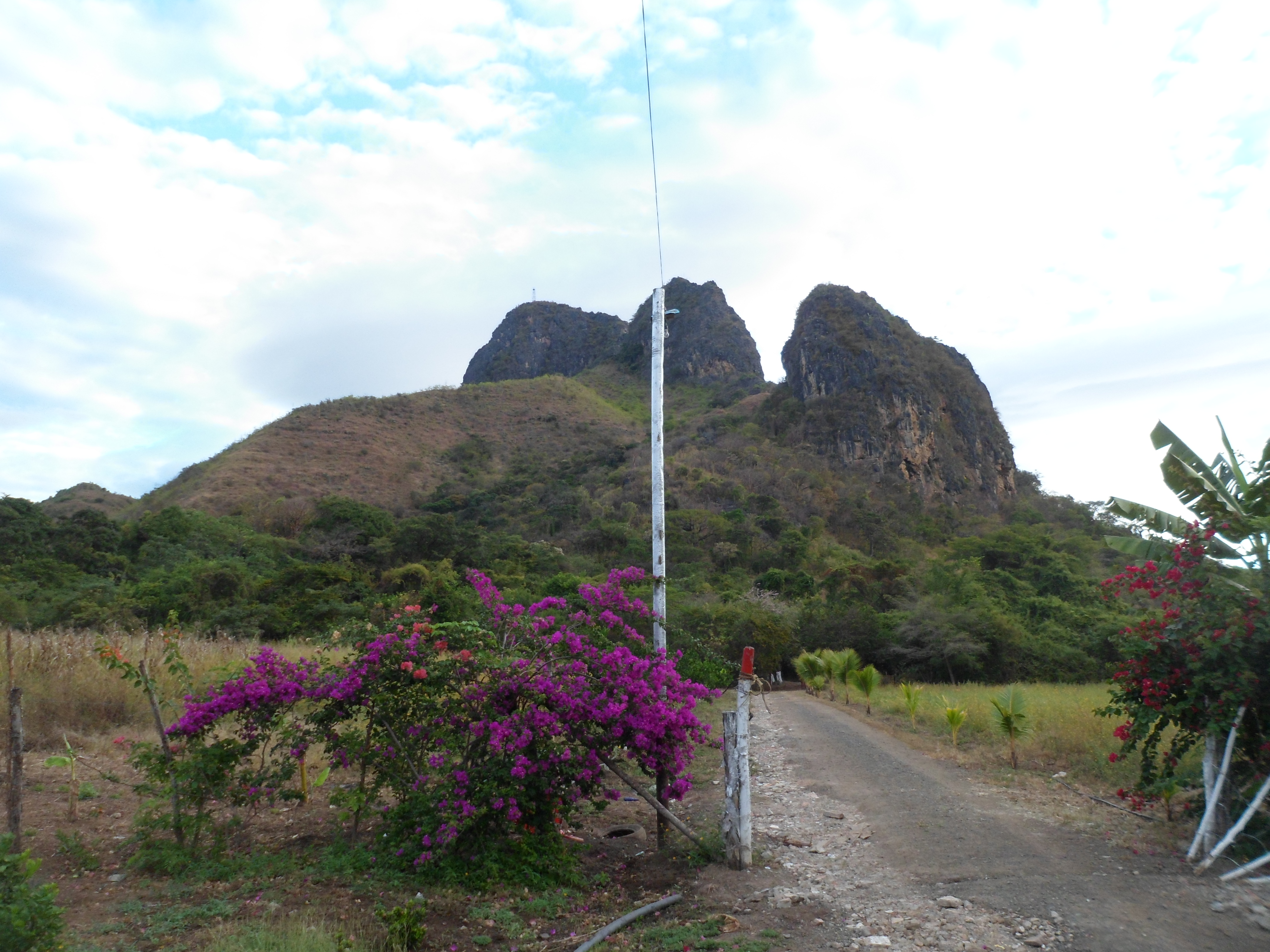

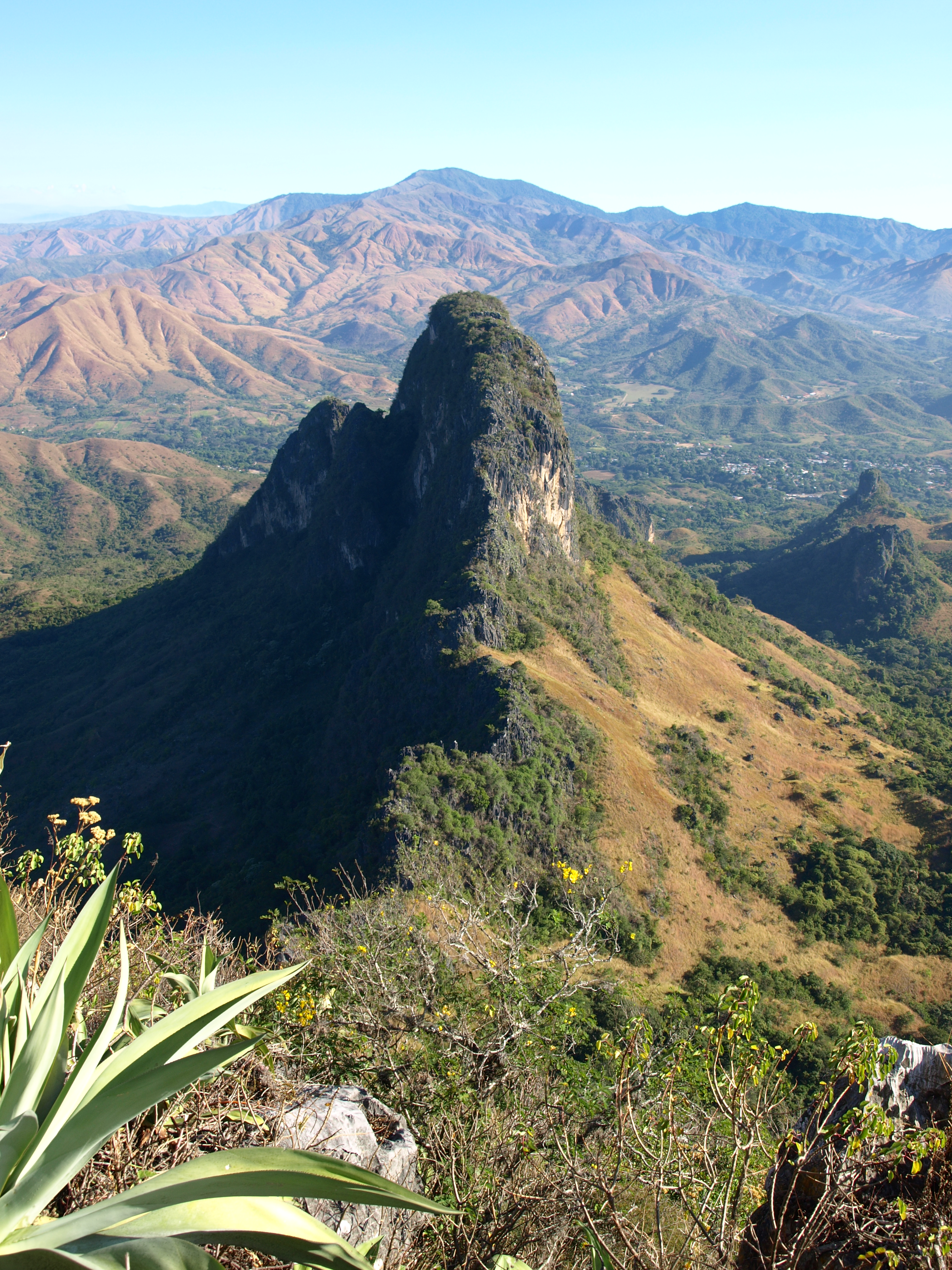

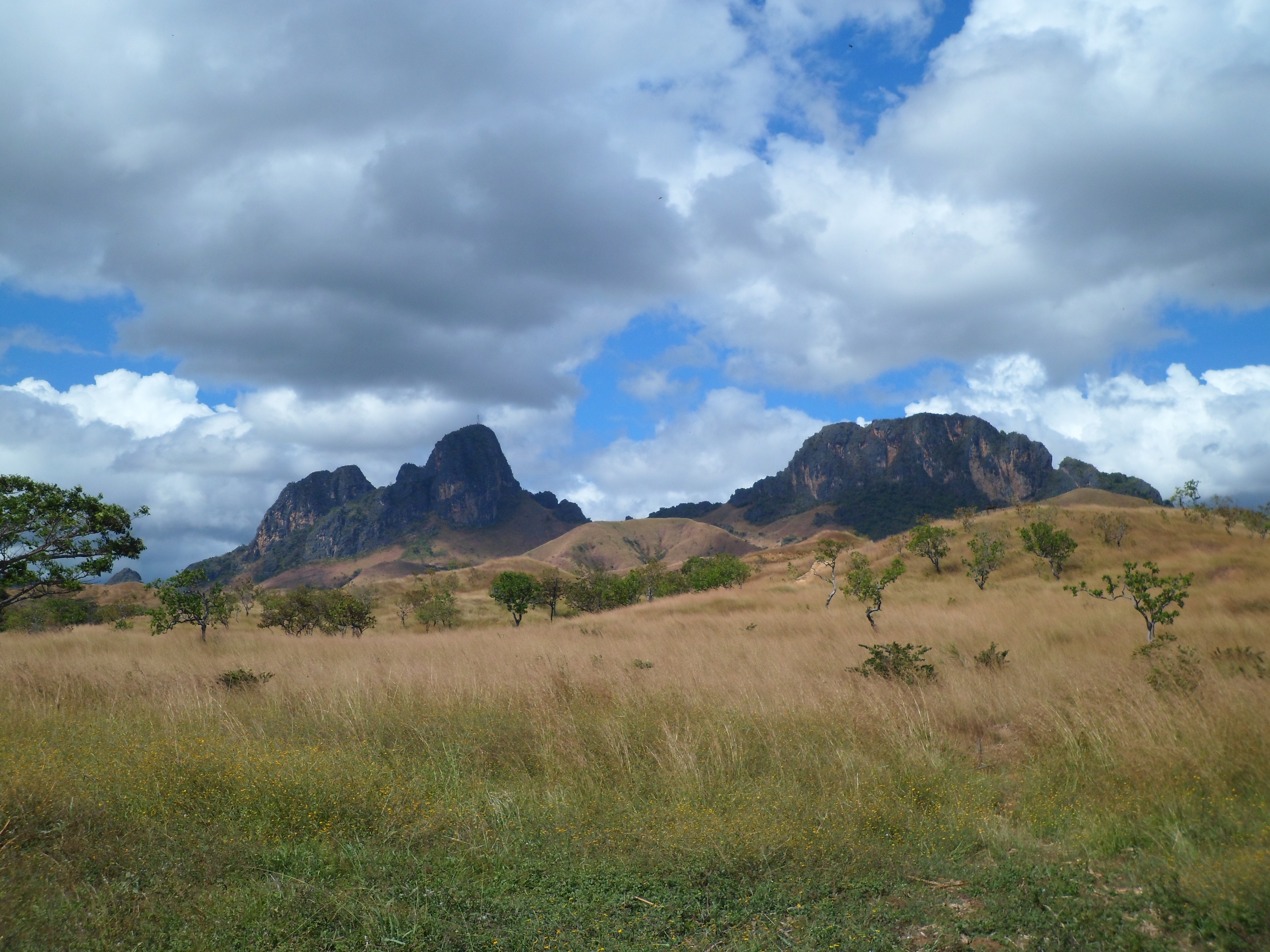

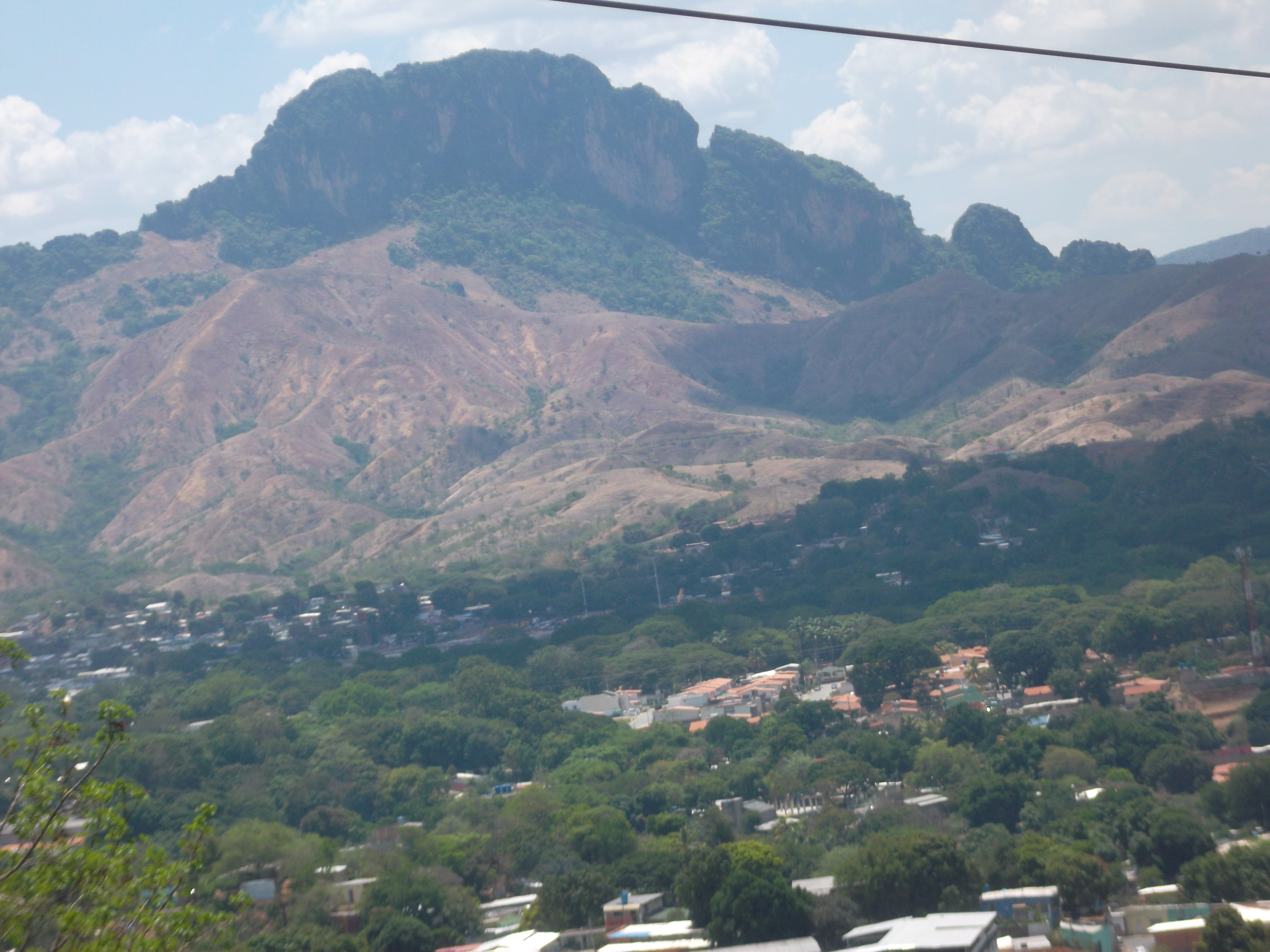

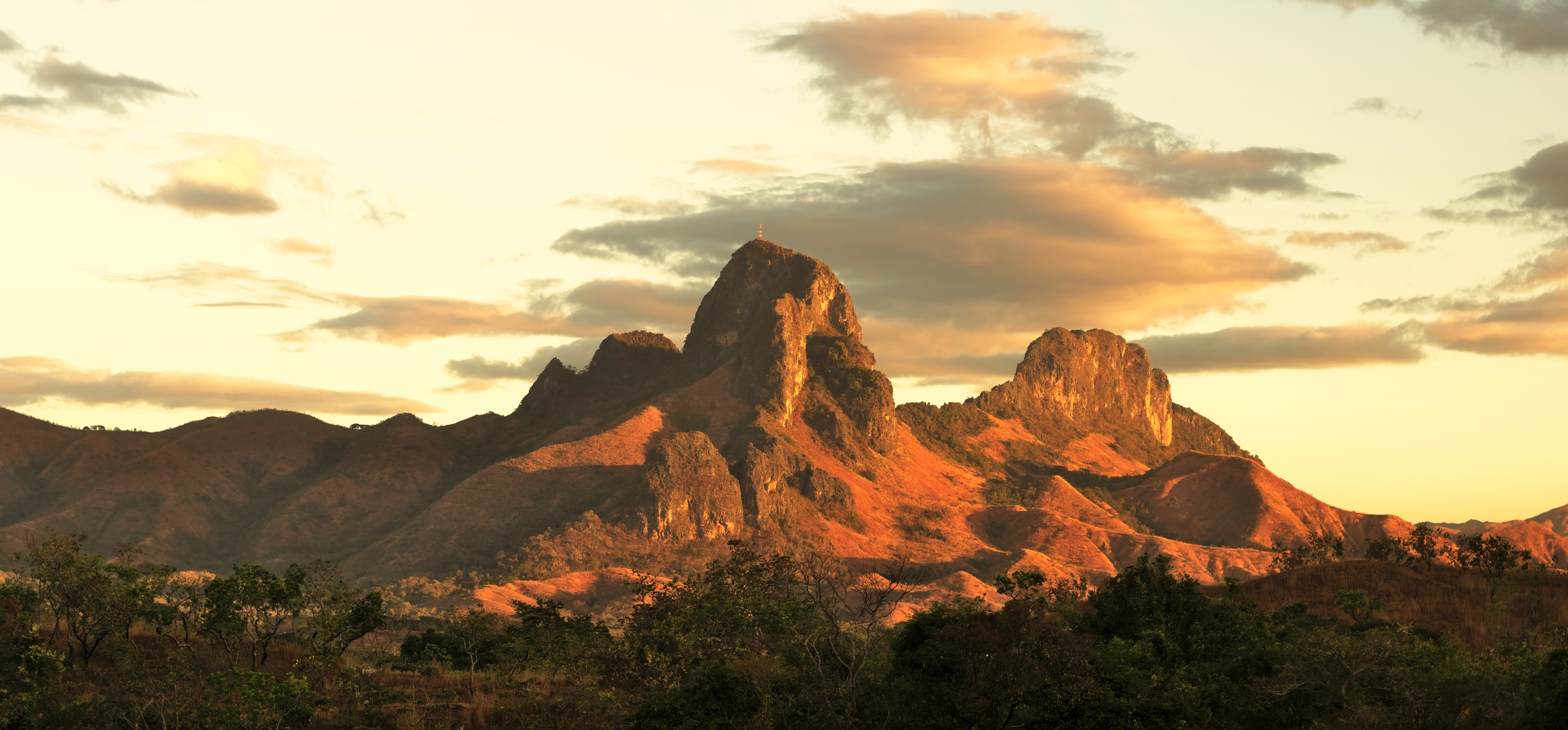

== See also ==
- List of national parks of Venezuela
- Piedra del Cocuy Natural Monument
