= Chivacoa =

Chivacoa, Yaracuy
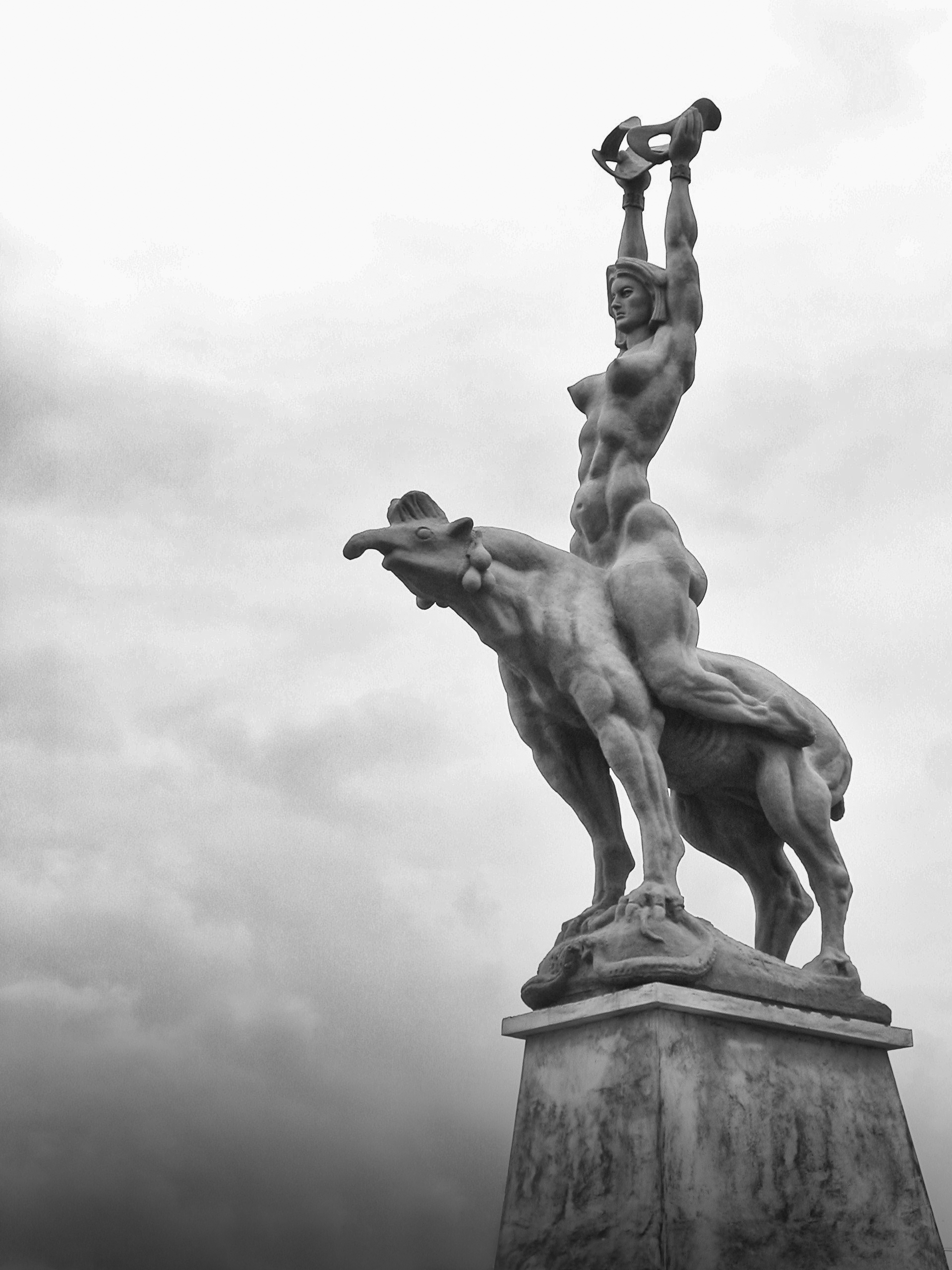
- Monument of María Lionza, famous Venezuelan deity on the main avenue of the city.

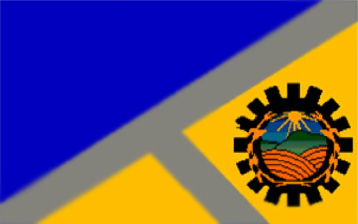
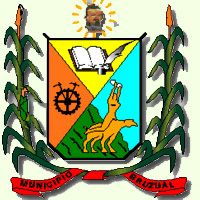
- Flag Coat of arms
- Motto: Cuna de Maria Lionza
- Location within Venezuela
- Coordinates: 10°9′36″N 68°54′35″W
- Country: Venezuela
- State: Yaracuy State
- Municipality: Bruzual Municipality
- Founded: 11 February 1695

Area
  - Total: 417 km^{2} (161 sq mi)
- Elevation: 296 m (971 ft)

Population
  - Total: 59,059
  - Demonym: Chivacoeño/a
- Time zone: UTC−4 (VST)
- Postal code: 3202
- Climate: Aw
- Website: bruzual-yaracuy.gob.ve(in Spanish)

Chivacoa is the capital city of Bruzual Municipality in Yaracuy State, Venezuela. Its population is 52,620, as per 2011 census.

== Festival ==
This town is famous for mystic rituals in Sorte Mountain, run by devotees of Maria Lionza. Carnaval is also celebrated there.

== History ==
It was officially founded in 1695 by the Spanish, on the site of a native settlement of the Caquetio people.
