= María Lionza =

Venezuelan female deity

- Main deity, goddess of love and nature
- Member of the Tres Potencias
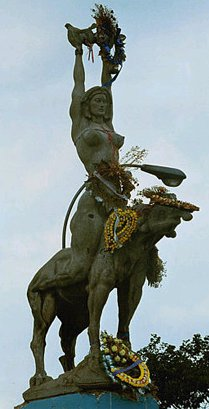
- Monument of María Lionza by Alejandro Colina in Caracas (picture from 2003), decorated with tributes
- Other names: La Reina (the Queen), Yara
- Major cult center: Sorte Mountain, Yaracuy, Venezuela
- Mount: Tapir
- Festivals: Pilgrimage on 12 October

María Lionza is the central figure in one of the most widespread new religious movements in Venezuela. The cult of María Lionza began in the 20th century as a blend of African, indigenous, and Catholic beliefs. She is revered as a goddess of nature, love, peace, and harmony. She has followers throughout Venezuelan society, from small rural villages to Caracas, where a monumental statue stands in her honor. The Cerro María Lionza Natural Monument (also known as Sorte mountain), where an important pilgrimage takes place every October, was renamed in her honour.

== Legend and symbols ==
According to the main legend, María Lionza was born in the 15th–16th century as the daughter of an indigenous chief from the region of Yaracuy. Her father sent her to live in the Sorte mountain. One day, while she was by the river, an anaconda attacked and devoured her. From within the serpent, María Lionza begged the mountain for help. The mountain agreed, María Lionza thus disintegrated and merged with Sorte mountain. Sometimes the anaconda is said to have exploded and caused the torrential rains that are common in the region.

María Lionza is sometimes portrayed as an indigenous woman and sometimes as pale-skinned with green eyes, usually surrounded by animals. She is often depicted naked riding a tapir.

María Lionza is sometimes called Yara, an indigenous alternative name. According to some versions, Yara would have taken the name Santa María de la Onza Talavera del Prato de Nívar or simply Santa María de la Onza ("Saint Mary of the Onza") under Catholic influence during the Spanish colonization of Venezuela. Subsequently, her name would have been shortened to "María Lionza".

== Cult and pilgrimage ==
The rites of María Lionza take place in the Sorte mountain, near the town of Chivacoa in Yaracuy state, Venezuela. The origins of the cult are uncertain; it is a syncretism of indigenous, Catholic, and African beliefs. Traditions of trance communication (mediums seeking to channel the souls of the dead) may have started around the 19th and 20th centuries in Latin America, popularized by the teachings of the 19th century Frenchman Allan Kardec. According to Venezuelan anthropologist Angelina Pollak, the rituals in Sorte started in the early 1920s, and were brought to urban areas a decade later.

Maria Lionza's followers travel to the mountain for a week each October 12th, on the national Day of Indigenous Resistance. In 2011, estimates indicated that about 10% to 30% of Venezuelans were followers of the cult. At the time, Venezuelan authorities indicated that about 200 000 followers participated in the traditions, including foreigners coming from the Americas and Europe. In 2011, Wade Glenn, an anthropologist from Tulane University in the United States, estimated that about 60% of the Venezuelan population may have participated in the cult of María Lionza at some point. Glenn argues that the conversational aspect of the rituals may have therapeutic effects.

Members from all Venezuelan social classes participate in the rituals. In local reports, the rituals have been considered to be linked with the late president of Venezuela Hugo Chávez, yet there is little to no evidence of this. Chávez himself said he did not take part in it, and some followers of María Lionza supported him while others did not. Some analysts argue that the decline of the power of the Catholic Church during Chávez's reign, along with the crisis in Venezuela, may have led many Venezuelans to join the cult to seek help. The hyperinflation in Venezuela that began in 2016 has affected the rituals, as many are unable to access the materials necessary to carry out the ceremonies.

=== Traditions and spiritism ===
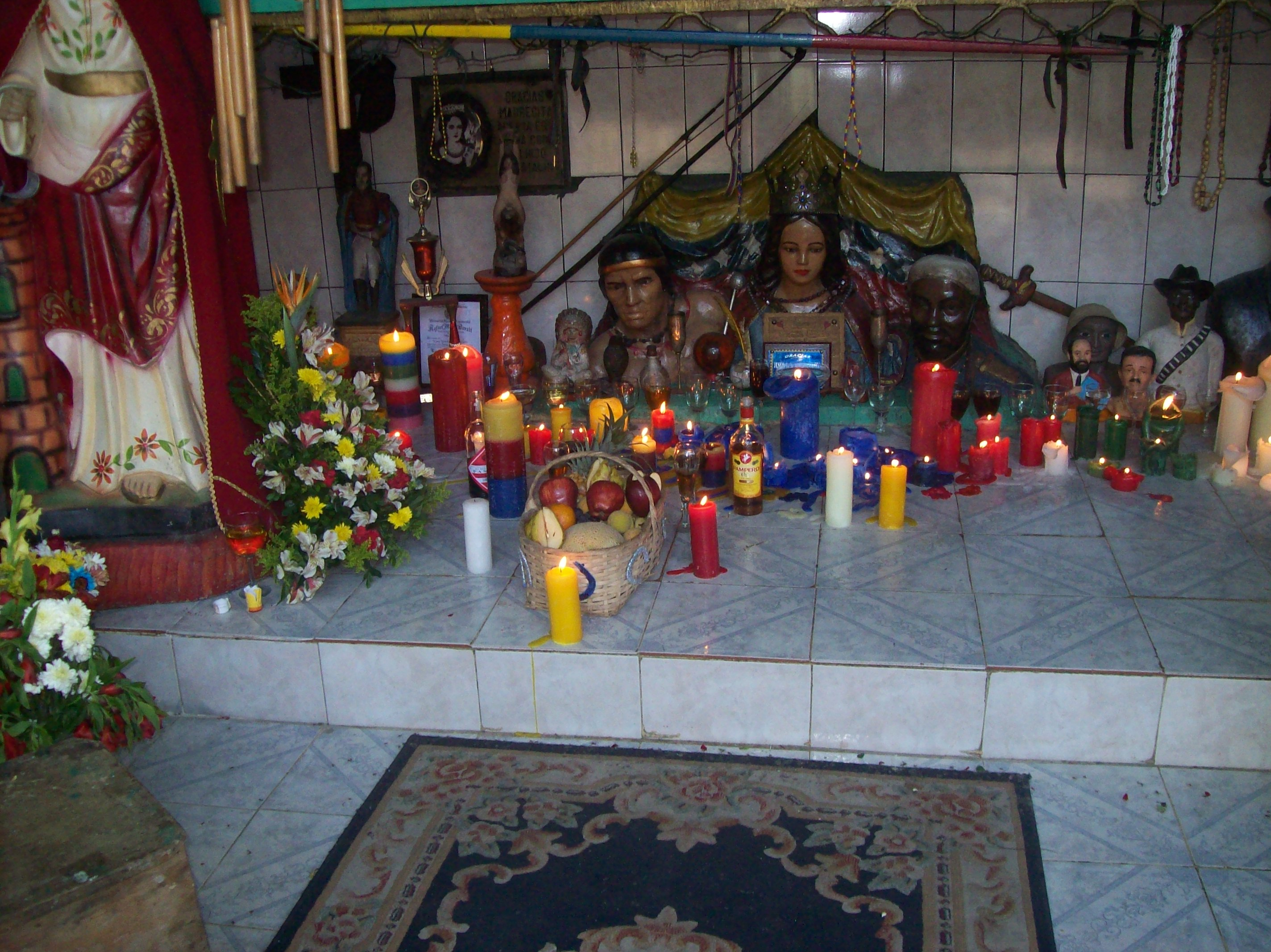
Altar dedicated to María Lionza, Negro Felipe and Guaicaipuro. The trinity of characters is known as the Tres Potencias. Here María Lionza is represented as a pale-skinned queen, one of her two representations.

The followers call themselves Marialionceros and refer to María Lionza as the "Queen" (Spanish: La Reina). People go to the Sorte mountain seeking strength, healing and to contact the souls of the dead. During the pilgrimage, the principal shamans and priests of María Lionza come together to pay homage. Many followers wear indigenous costumes and perform a traditional fire walking dance called the "dance of the hot coals" (Spanish: baile de las brasas).

Several spirits are also worshipped during the rituals alongside Catholic saints and Virgin Mary. According to the cult, María Lionza is one of the main "three powers" (Spanish: Tres Potencias), which also include Guaicaipuro, a legendary indigenous resistance leader of 16th century, and Negro Felipe, (Note: There is no record of Negro Felipe in historical documents. It may be a blend between other black figures of resistance like Negro Primero and Negro Miguel, also spirits of the cult.) a black Afro-American soldier that allegedly participated in the Venezuelan War of Independence. The lower spirits, usually referred to as brothers (Spanish: hermanos) by the pilgrims, are arranged into 'courts', divided by identity: Indigenous, African, Viking, Liberator. The spirits include farmers, modern criminals and famous historical figures, like Simón Bolívar.

The participants cleanse themselves in the muddy rivers to receive the spirits. The shamans act as mediums between the pilgrims and the spirits, and usually demand that the devotees enter into trance states, which often lead them to speak in tongues or harm themselves. The shamans and the Marialionceros employ blessings, curses, drumming, cigar smoking, tobacco chewing, and liquor during the yearly rituals. Various sources have reported sightings of shamans, sometimes wearing horned helmets, claiming to have contacted the legendary Viking Eric the Red, the first Norse explorer to discover Greenland.

Many members from other religions native to Latin America and Venezuela are present, primarily Santeros (practitioners of a syncretic faith that combines African Yoruba beliefs and Catholicism) and Paleros (practitioners of a syncretic Afro-Cuban religion that centers on communication with the dead).

== Monument in Caracas ==
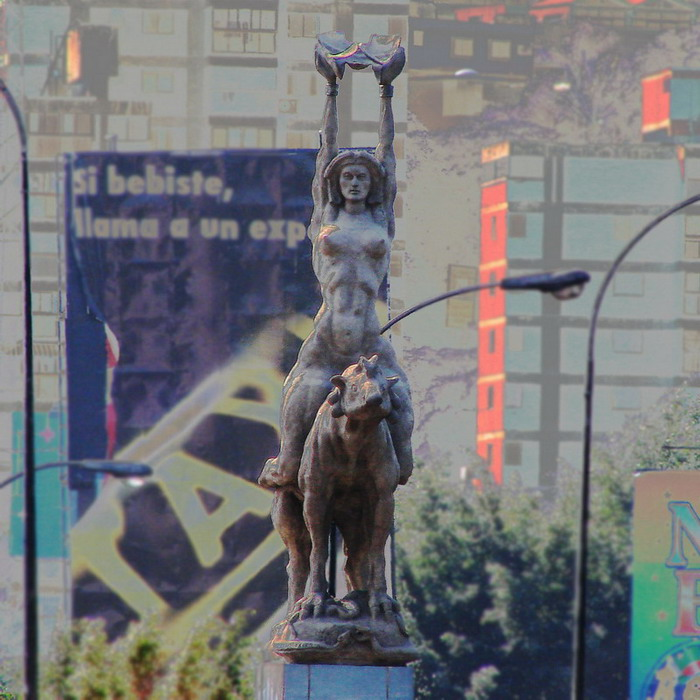
Frontal perspective of the 2004 cast of Alejandro Colina's 1951 statue of María Lionza in Caracas

One of the most iconic portrayals of María Lionza is the 1951 monument in the Francisco Fajardo Highway in Caracas by Venezuelan sculptor Alejandro Colina. It portrays María Lionza as a muscular naked woman, riding a large tapir which is standing on a snake. Lionza holds a female pelvis, representing fertility, high above her head.

The statue was made for the 1951 Bolivarian Games, to sit outside the Central University of Venezuela (UCV)'s Olympic Stadium, and the Olympic flame was held in the pelvis at the top of the statue during this event. The statue had been commissioned by the dictator Marcos Pérez Jiménez, who wanted to make María Lionza a symbol of Venezuela. The statue was moved to the highway in 1953, after the university and Pérez Jiménez became concerned that the accessible campus location would allow María Lionza's devotees to gather and to spread their devotion in Venezuela. In 2004 the original statue was moved to a university warehouse and a new casting was put in its place. In October 2022, the statue was extracted without permission from the authorities and traveled from the warehouse to the Sorte mountain some days before the beginning of the yearly pilgrimage.

== In popular culture ==
Rubén Blades and Willie Colón's salsa song "María Lionza", from their 1978 album Siembra, is dedicated to the Venezuelan deity.

Ruddy Rodríguez, former Miss Venezuela, was the protagonist of María Lionza, a 2006 Venezuelan TV film.

In 2009, the New Weird America musician Devendra Banhart composed "María Lionza", published in his album What Will We Be, as an "evocation to the goddess."

The Venezuelan singer Arca paid homage to the goddess in her music video Prada / Rakata released in 2021.

2023 Tom Clancy's Command and Control by Marc Cameron features Maria Lionza as a character in the early part of the novel.
