= Piedra del Cocuy Natural Monument =

Piedra del Cocuy Natural Monument Monumento Natural Piedra del Cocuy
- IUCN category III (natural monument or feature)
- Location within Venezuela
- Location: Venezuela
- Coordinates: 1°14′N 66°49′W
- Area: 0.15 km^{2} (0.058 sq mi)
- Established: 12 December 1978

The Piedra del Cocuy Natural Monument (Spanish: Monumento Natural Piedra del Cocuy) is a natural protected area located in the Río Negro municipality, in the state of Amazonas, Venezuela. It received the status of natural monument by decree No. 2,986 dated 12 December 1978, published in Official Gazette 2.417-E dated 7 March 1979.

== Monument ==
Covering an area of 15 hectares (37 acres), the monument status was created with the aim of protecting the Piedra del Cocuy and its natural surroundings. It is located less than two miles east of the Rio Negro near the Brazilian and Colombian borders.

The Piedra del Cocuy is a prominence of granite rising 400 metres (1,300 ft) above the plane and comprising three steep peaks. Due to its harsh terrain, vegetation is relatively sparse though characterized by its endemism. Vegetation abounds in the surrounding tropical forest.

== See also ==
- List of national parks of Venezuela
- Natural Monument
