= Hawkshaw =

Hawkshaw may refer to:

== People ==
- Alan Hawkshaw (1937–2021), British composer and performer
- Ann Hawkshaw (1812–1885), English poet
- Benjamin Hawkshaw (died 1738), Irish Anglican divine
- Dean Hawkshaw (born 1997), Scottish footballer
- Hawkshaw Hawkins (1921–1963), country music singer
- John Hawkshaw (1811–1891), English engineer
- John Clarke Hawkshaw (1841–1921), son of the above, also an engineer
- Kirsty Hawkshaw (born 1969), British dance/electronica/house artist and songwriter
- Sarah Hawkshaw (born 1995), Irish hockey player
- David Hawkshaw (born 1999), Irish rugby player and brother of Sarah Hawkshaw

== Places ==
- Hawkshaw Bridge, a cable-stayed suspension bridge in New Brunswick, Canada.
- Hawkshaw, Greater Manchester, a small village in the north-west of England.
- Hawkshaw, New Brunswick
- Hawkshaw, Scottish Borders, a settlement named after an ancestral family home near Tweedsmuir, Scotland.
- Hawkshaw, South Australia, a government town in the locality of Moockra.
- Hundred of Hawkshaw, a cadastral unit in the Northern Territory of Australia.

== Other ==
- Hawkshaw the Detective, comic strip character
- Little Miss Hawkshaw, 1921 American drama film
