= Cocorote Municipality =

Cocorote Municipality Municipio Cocorote
- Municipality
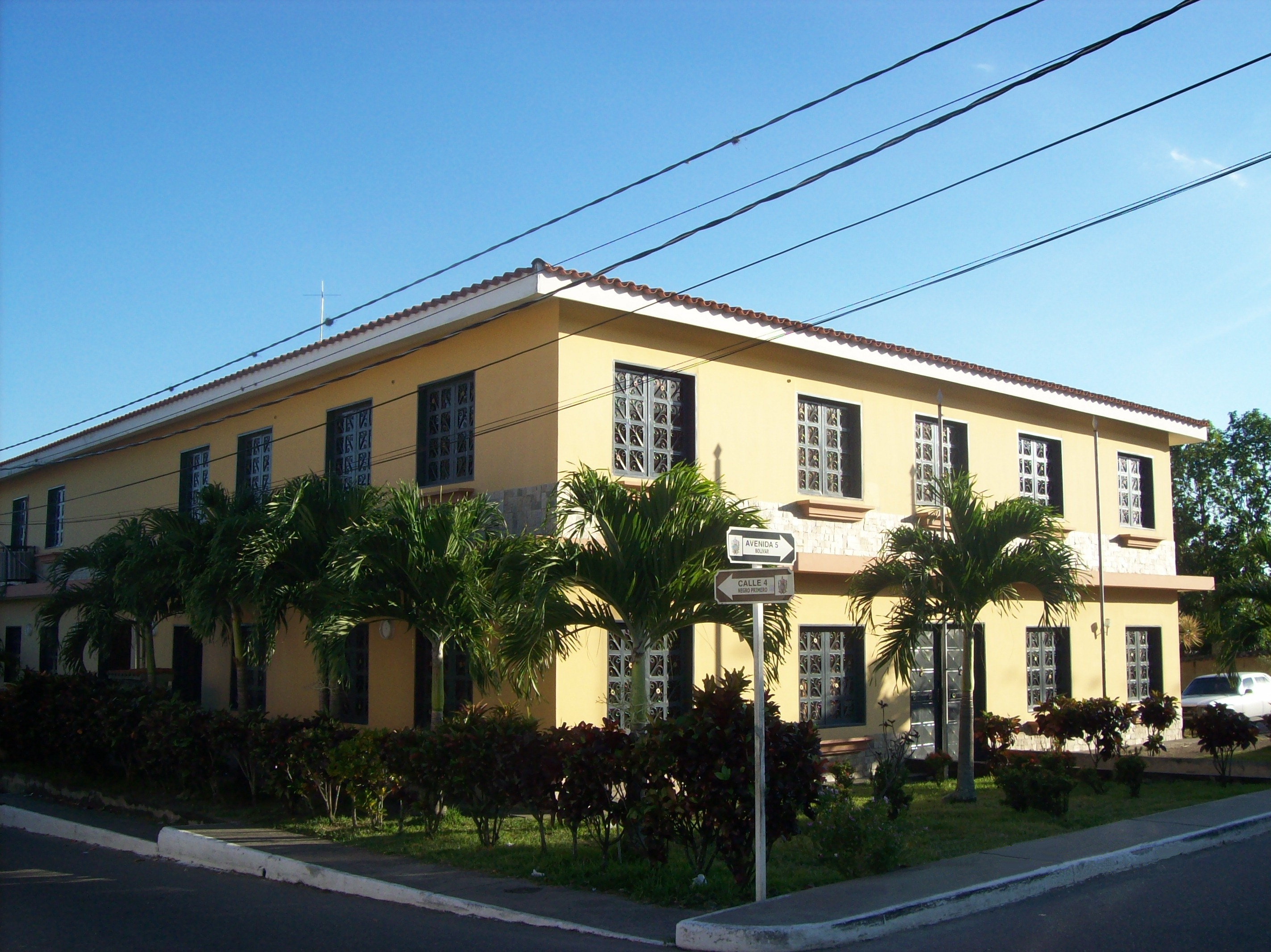

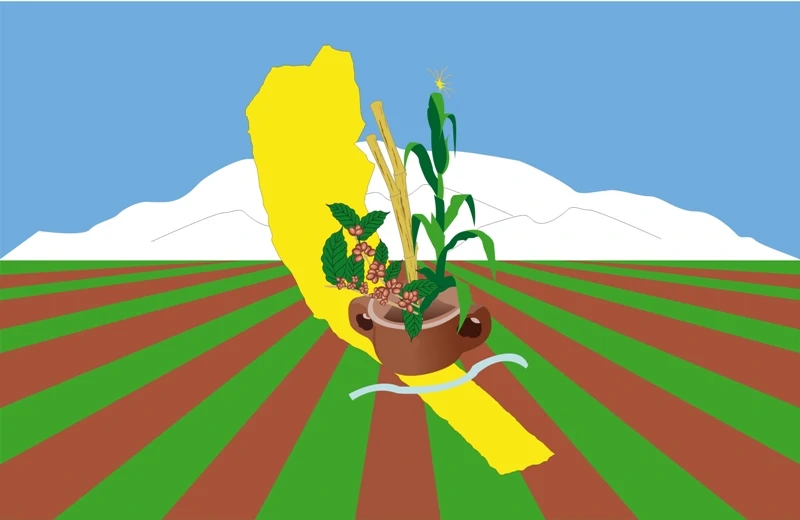
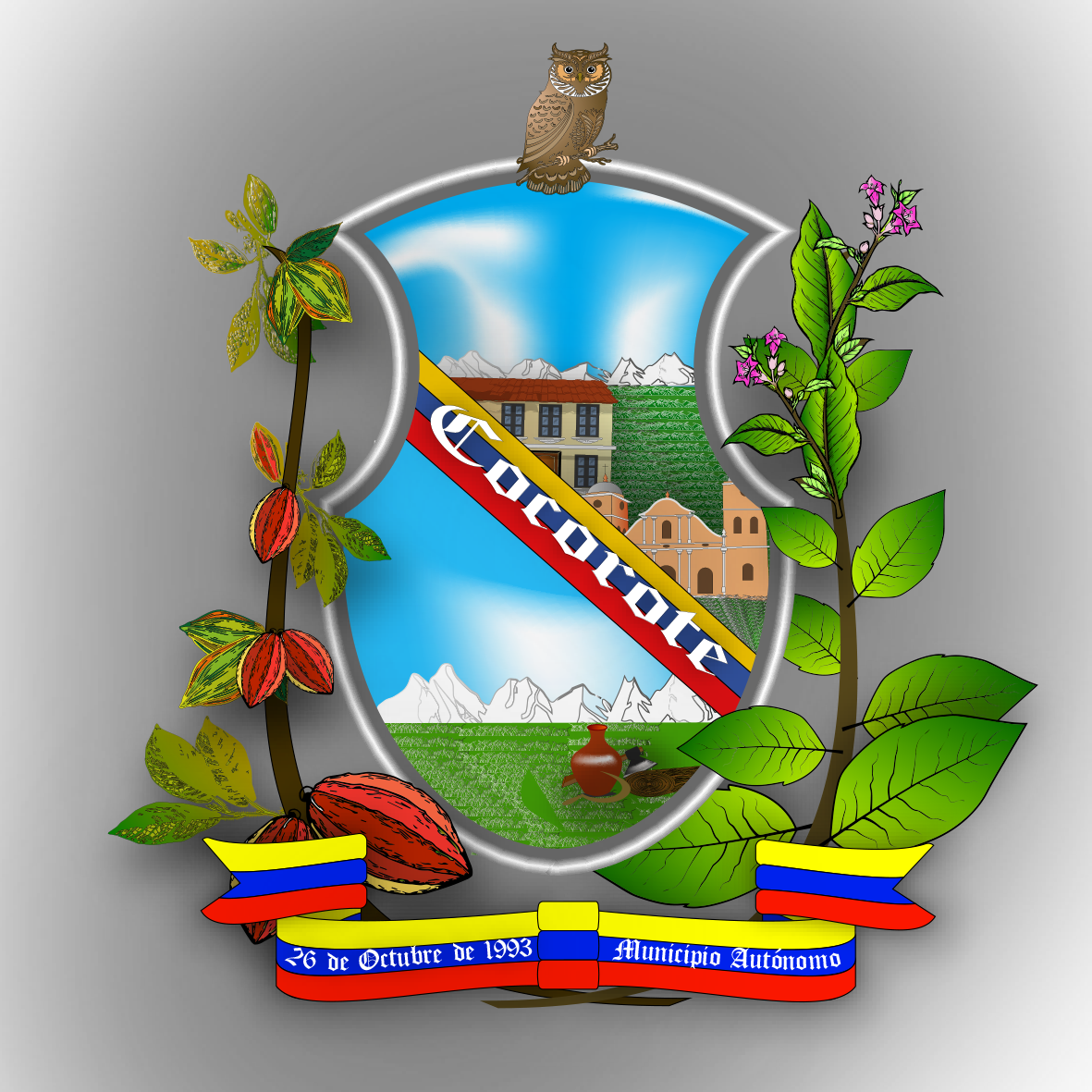
- Flag Coat of arms

- Location in Yaracuy

- Location in Venezuela
- Coordinates: 10°16′41″N 68°45′40″W
- Country: Venezuela
- State: Yaracuy
- Municipal seat: Cocorote

Area
  - Total: 135.0 km^{2} (52.1 sq mi)

Population (2019 projection)
  - Total: 51,981
  - Density: 385.0/km^{2} (997.3/sq mi)
- Time zone: UTC−4 (VET)

Cocorote is one of the 14 municipalities of the state of Yaracuy, Venezuela. The municipality is located in central Yaracuy, occupying an area of 135 km² with a population of 51,981 inhabitants as of 2019. The municipal seat is in Cocorote. Economically, the Cocorote relied on cocoa bean, playing a role in the illicit cocoa trade between local producers and Dutch commercial networks operating through Tucacas and Curaçao, utilising the waterways through the Yaracuy River.

== Economy ==
Historically, the economy of Cocorote relied on agriculture, which served as the primary catalyst for the region's settlement and growth during the late 17th and early 18th centuries. The fertility of the Yaracuy River valley facilitated the expansion of large haciendas specialising in cocoa bean cultivation, driving a highly lucrative but clandestine commerce. The Spanish Crown prohibited trade with foreign nations, so local producers in the main settlement (then known as Cerrito de Cocorote) bypassed official colonial channels to sell their harvests directly to Sephardic Jewish merchants in Tucacas, who acted as commercial agents for the Dutch colony of Curaçao. To sustain this illicit trade and evade royal authorities, local traders utilised a strategic logistical network, using the Yaracuy River as a rapid, discreet highway to transport cocoa to the Gulf of Paria (known then as Golfo Triste), while leveraging interconnected waterways between the Yaracuy and Aroa rivers to safely reach the coast.

== Demographics ==
Based on the 2011 Venezuelan census, The population of the Cocorote Municipality was 45,297 people, accounting for 7.06% of the total population of the state of Yaracuy. An overwhelming majority of the population (94.8%) resides in Cocorote, the municipal seat of the municipality.

By June 2019, official projections from the Venezuelan Statistics National Institute estimated the population of Cocorote as 51,981 people, representing an annual growth rate of 1.7% since 2011 and showing a population density of 385.0 inhabitants/km². However, these projections do not account for the impact of emigration linked to the country's recent economic and political circumstances.

The gender distribution of the population showed an even balance with 20,435 men (49.3%) and 21,046 women (50.7%). The age distribution showed that the largest segment of the population was aged 15 to 64, comprising 66.9% of the people. Younger people aged 0 to 14 made up 28% of the population, while those aged 65 and older accounted for the remaining 5.1%. The municipality is almost entirely urbanized, with 94.8% of the inhabitants (39,310) living in urban centers compared to only 5.2% (2,171) in rural areas.

Ethnically, the municipality identified as predominantly Mestizo (60%) and White people (35.5%). Minority groups included 3.1% Afro-Venezuelans and 1.3% belonging to other ethnic groups, with 43 individuals identifying as indigenous. The literacy rate was 96.1%, with 1,309 inhabitants of Cocorote not able to read or write.
