= Aroa mines =

- Location in Venezuela

Location
- Location: Aroa, Bolívar municipality, Yaracuy, Venezuela; 10°25′55″N 68°53′38.7″W

Production
- Products: Copper
- Type: Underground
- Greatest depth: 95 metres (312 ft)

History
- Opened: 1605
- Closed: 1936

The Aroa mines (Spanish: Minas de Aroa) were copper mines in the state of Yaracuy, Venezuela. Mining started in 1632, and at the end of the colonial period the mines were owned by the Bolívar family. Simón Bolívar leased the mines to an English company, and after his death his sisters sold the mines. They continued to be operated by English companies, using Cornish and local miners, until 1936. Today the mines are closed and partially flooded. Their remains are preserved by the Parque Bolivariano Minas de Aroa and may be visited by the public.

== Location ==
The Aroa copper deposits are located in the Bolivar Iron Quadrilateral mining district. They are 4 kilometres (2.5 mi) east of the village of Aroa in the state of Yaracuy, about 220 kilometres (140 mi) west of Caracas and 83 kilometres (52 mi) from San Felipe, Yaracuy. The mines are in rugged country about 600 metres (2,000 ft) above sea level on the northern side of the Andes, which run from east to west. The climate is warm and humid, and the area is covered in thick forest.

== Early years ==
In the 16th century, it was known that there was gold in the Yaracuy, Santa Cruz and Aroa rivers, and in 1605, gold deposits were found in a small valley leading to the Aroa River. The King of Spain gave the mines in perpetuity to Dr. Francisco Marín de Narváez and his heirs in exchange for 40,000 pesos. Mining began in 1632, following gold veins, which led to discovery of large deposits of copper. The mines attracted the indigenous Gayones Indians of the Duaca region, 40 kilometres (25 mi) to the southwest. They came in part for the wages, in part because at the mines they could practice their traditional religion without interference by Catholic priests.

Around the end of the 17th century the "Cobre Caracas" mining company became the property of the family of Simón Bolívar (1783–1830). The largest of the mines, La Vizcaina, was worked by 60 to 70 slaves. There was a surge in copper production in the 1790s. Alexander von Humboldt said the mines held some of the finest copper in the world. According to an 1825 newspaper report, "The Aroa mines have been but partially and defectively worked by the old Spanish Government, about 40 of the natives only being employed at one time and even then yielded 300 tons of refined copper annually."

== English mining operation ==
The fighting continued in Venezuela from 1810 to 1821, when the decisive Battle of Carabobo took place. In 1824 Bolivar leased the mines to British entrepreneurs. According to some sources his aim was to help finance the struggle for independence from Spain. Captain Joseph Malachy sailed from Plymouth in March 1825 to take up his position as agent and resident director of the Bolivar Mining Association at the Aroa copper mines. Malachy was given the huge salary of £1,200, compared to the typical salary of about £300 for a mine manager in Cornwall. The British employed about 1,200 workers in the mines, including British and Venezuelans. They used the Aroa River to carry the ore by barge to the coast, where it was loaded onto ships.

In 1832, Bolivar's sisters Juana and Maria Antonia sold the mines to Robert Dent, an Englishman who owned the Bolívar Mining Association. In the 1830s, Cornishmen in the reduction department of the Aroa mines made significant advances in methods of calcinating the copper ore. However, the company closed the mines in 1836 due to high mortality among the European workers and tensions with the native workers. The Bolívar Mining Association was succeeded by companies such as La Quebrada Land Mining Company, Quebrada Railway Land and Copper Company Limited, Aroa Mines Limited and Bolívar Railway Company Limited.

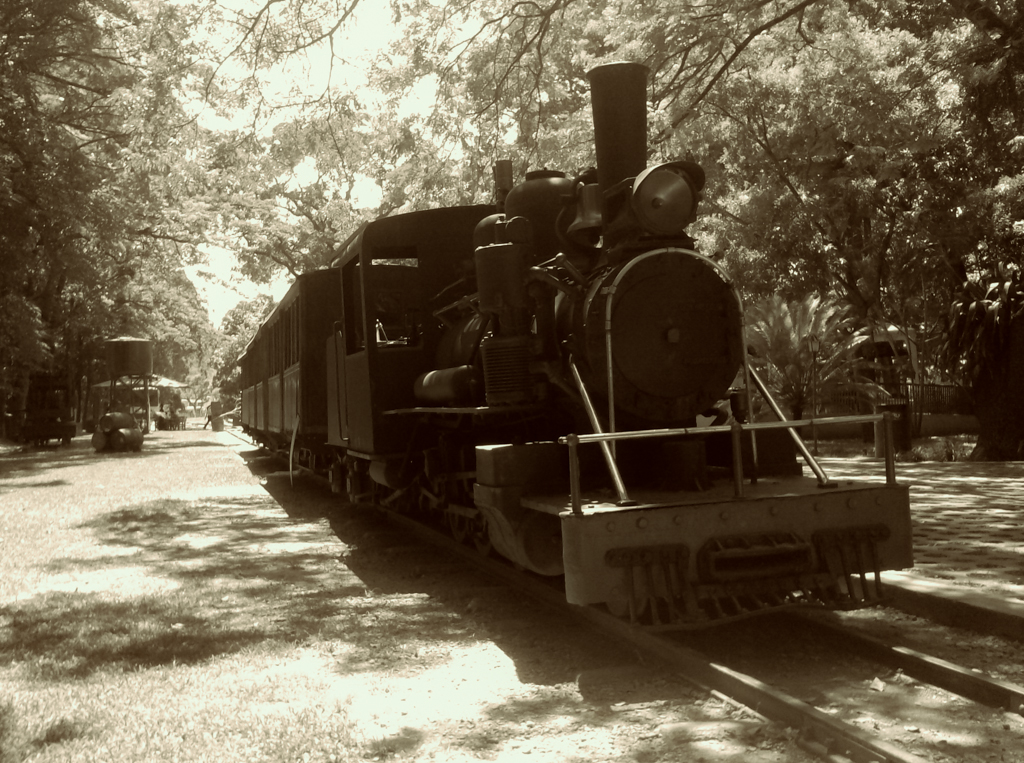
Engine from the Tucacas-Minas de Aroa railway

The owners planned to build a railway to the coast in the 1830s under the supervision of the young English engineer, John, later Sir John, Hawkshaw. During Hawkshaw's short stay at Aroa, a new road was constructed to reduce the mule haulage distance, navigation of the River Aroa was improved to cater for larger boats and the route of a future railway line from the mine to the coast planned. Unfortunately, the climate at Aroa was more than Hawkshaw's health could stand, and in 1834 he was obliged to return to England. The project was put off several times due to civil wars and problems at the mines. The mines were damaged during the Federal War (1859–1863). Finally a narrow gauge line from Aroa to the port of Tucacas was opened in 1877. The railway was built by the British-controlled New Quebrada Railway, Land, and Copper Company, which also established a shipping service from Tucacas to Puerto Cabello, the region's main import-export centre. The Ferrocarril Bolívar was the first railway in Venezuela. Also in 1877, the road from Barquisimeto to Aroa was upgraded so it could be used by wagons and carts. In 1891, the railway was extended from Aroa via Duaca to Barquisimeto.

During the Venezuelan crisis of 1902–03, Britain, Germany and Italy imposed a naval blockade due to Venezuela's refusal to pay damages suffered during the Federal War. In 1903, the British-Venezuelan Commission made an arbitration decision in the Aroa Mines Case that damages would not be allowed for injury to people or property committed by the troops of unsuccessful rebels. The umpire quoted an 1868 judgement that "Damages done to property in consequence of battles being fought upon it between the belligerents is to be ascribed to the hazards of war and can not be made the foundation of a claim against the government of the country in which the engagement took place."

Aroa was the first town in the country to obtain electricity and telephone service. A cableway was built linking the mines to the town. In 1915, the mines were owned by the South American Copper Syndicate Ltd. In 1930, they were operated by the English-owned Bolivar Mining Association, which used coastal mangrove trees for lumber in the mines. There were six mines, the Aroa Norte, Titiara, Titiara Norte, San Antonio, Zajón Verde 1 and Zajón Verde 2. The longest was the Titiara Norte at 2,100 metres (6,900 ft), while the deepest was the Aroa Norte at 95 metres (312 ft).

== Later years ==
The mines were abandoned in 1936. In 1957, the Venezuelan state acquired the mines and transferred them to the Venezuelan Petrochemical Institute, which extracted pyrite and copper carbonate from them for the production of sulfuric acid. In 1972, the Institute transferred its rights to Yaracuy state. The 9,000 hectares (22,000 acres) Parque Minas de Aroa (Aroa Mines Park) was created on 21 September 1974, containing the old mine workings. The park contains the remains of the mining camp, copper smelter, railway and English cemetery, and 3 kilometres (1.9 mi) away the remains of the mine itself and the crushers. There is a small museum with records of the mine. The mines are now partially flooded.

== Sources ==
- ""Aroa" Copper Deposit In Yaracuy, Venezuela", The Diggings
- Aroa Mines Case (on merits) (PDF), British-Venezuelan Commission, 1903
- Beaumont, Martin (2015), Sir John Hawkshaw 1811-1891, The Lancashire & Yorkshire Railway Society www.lyrs.org.uk, ISBN 978-0-9559467-7-6
- Las Minas de Aroa, propiedad de la South American Copper Syndicate Ltd. y sus nuevos denunciadores, Caracas: Lit. y tip. del Comercio, 1915, OCLC 180990674
- Maddicks, Russell (2011-02-01), Venezuela: The Bradt Travel Guide, Bradt Travel Guides, ISBN 978-1-84162-299-6
- Mangroves: Northern South America: Northwestern Venezuela, WWF
- "Parque Bolivariano Minas de Aroa", Yaracuy, 21 May 2011
- Payton, Philip (2005), The Cornish Overseas: A History of Cornwall's 'great Emigration', Dundurn, ISBN 978-1-904880-04-2
- Rodriguez, Simon E. (1 January 1974), Sulfur Isotopes In Sulfides From The Bailadores Ore Deposits, Venezuelan Andes, And The Aroa Mining District, Western Central Range, Venezuela, Organization: Society for Mining, Metallurgy & Exploration
- Schwartz, Sharron P. (2004), Creating the cult of "Cousin Jack": Cornish miners in Latin America 1812-1848 and the development of an international mining labour market (PDF)
- Silva, Ricardo (27 September 1993), An introduction to artificial cavities in Venezuela during the colonial period, Caracas: Centro de exploraciones espeleológicas de la Universidad Simón Bolívar, archived from the original on 2020-10-22
- Yarrington, Douglas (1997-12-15), A Coffee Frontier: Land, Society, and Politics in Duaca, Venezuela, 1830–1936, University of Pittsburgh Pre, ISBN 978-0-8229-7494-9
