= John Hawkshaw =

English civil engineer (1811–1891)

Sir John Hawkshaw
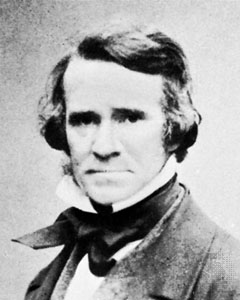
- by Maull & Polyblank
- Born: 9 April 1811; Leeds, Yorkshire
- Died: 2 June 1891 (aged 80); London
- Engineering career
- Discipline: civil engineer
- Institutions: Institution of Civil Engineers (president)
- Projects: London Circle Line
- Significant design: Suez Canal (inquiry)

Sir John Hawkshaw FRS FRSE FRSA MICE (9 April 1811 – 2 June 1891), was an English civil engineer. He served as President of the Institution of Civil Engineers 1862-63. His most noteworthy work is the Severn Tunnel.

== Early life ==
He was born in Leeds, Yorkshire, the son of Henry Hawkshaw, a hostler, and Sarah Carrington and was educated at Leeds Grammar School. Before he was 21, Hawkshaw was employed under Charles Fowler in the construction of turnpike roads in the West Riding of Yorkshire. This was followed by a period working in the office of Alexander Nimmo, the eminent Scottish Civil Engineer, who had been engaged by Lancashire investors to design a rail network to link Manchester, Leeds and the Humber. In the year of his majority, he obtained an appointment as engineer to the Bolivar Mining Association in Venezuela. The company was developing copper mines at Aroa in the west of the newly independent country. The mine relied on a combination of small boats and mule to transport the ore to Point Tucacas where it was shipped to England. During Hawkshaw's short stay at Aroa, a new road was constructed to reduce the mule haulage distance, navigation of the River Aroa was improved to cater for larger boats and the route of a future railway line from the mine to the coast planned. Unfortunately, the climate at Aroa was more than Hawkshaw's health could stand, and in 1834 he was obliged to return to England.

== Career ==
He soon obtained employment under Jesse Hartley at the Liverpool docks, and subsequently was made engineer in charge of the railway and navigation works of the Manchester, Bolton and Bury Canal Company. In 1845 he became chief engineer to the Manchester and Leeds Railway, and in 1847 to its successor, the Lancashire and Yorkshire Railway for which he constructed a large number of branch lines. One such was the Manchester and Southport line surveyed by his associate Clement Wilks and as well as the Lancashire and Yorkshire Railway near Heckmondwike. In 1850 he moved to London and began to practice as a consulting engineer, at first alone, but subsequently in partnership with Harrison Hayter. In that capacity his work was of an extremely varied nature, embracing almost every branch of engineering.

He retained his connection with the Lancashire & Yorkshire Company until his retirement from professional work in 1888, and was consulted on all the important engineering points that affected it in that long period. In London he was responsible for the Charing Cross and Cannon Street railways, together with the two bridges which carried them over the Thames; he was engineer of the East London railway, which passed under the Thames through Sir Marc Brunel's well-known tunnel; and jointly with Sir J Wolfe-Barry he constructed the section of the Underground railway which completed the inner circle between the Aldgate and Mansion House stations.

In addition, many railway works claimed his attention in all parts of the world—Germany, Russia, India, Mauritius, etc. One noteworthy point in his railway practice was his advocacy, in opposition to Robert Stephenson, of steeper gradients than had previously been thought desirable or possible, and so far back as 1838 he expressed decided disapproval of the maintenance of the broad gauge on the Great Western, because of the troubles he foresaw it would lead to in connection with future railway extension, and because he objected in general to breaks of gauge in the lines of a country.

The construction of canals was another branch of engineering in which John Hawkshaw was actively engaged. In 1862 he became a chief engineer of the Dutch North Sea Canal ship-canal.

According to a speech of Lord Houghton, he may be said to have been the saviour of the Suez Canal. About that time the scheme was in very bad odour, and the khedive determined to get the opinion of an English engineer as to its practicability, having made up his mind to stop the works if that opinion was unfavourable. Hawkshaw was chosen to make the inquiry, and it was because his report was entirely favourable that Ferdinand de Lesseps was able to say at the opening ceremony that to him he owed the canal. However, in his books with documents related to the Suez Canal, De Lesseps does not mention Hawkshaw.

As a member of the International Congress which considered the construction of an inter-ocean canal across Central America, he thought best of the Nicaragua route, and privately he regarded the Panama scheme as impracticable at a reasonable cost, although publicly he expressed no opinion on the matter and left the Congress without voting. Sir John Hawkshaw also had a wide experience in constructing harbours (e.g. Holyhead) and docks (e.g. Penarth, the Albert Dock at Hull, and South Dock (formerly the City Canal) of the West India Docks in London), in river-engineering, in drainage and sewerage, in water-supply, etc.

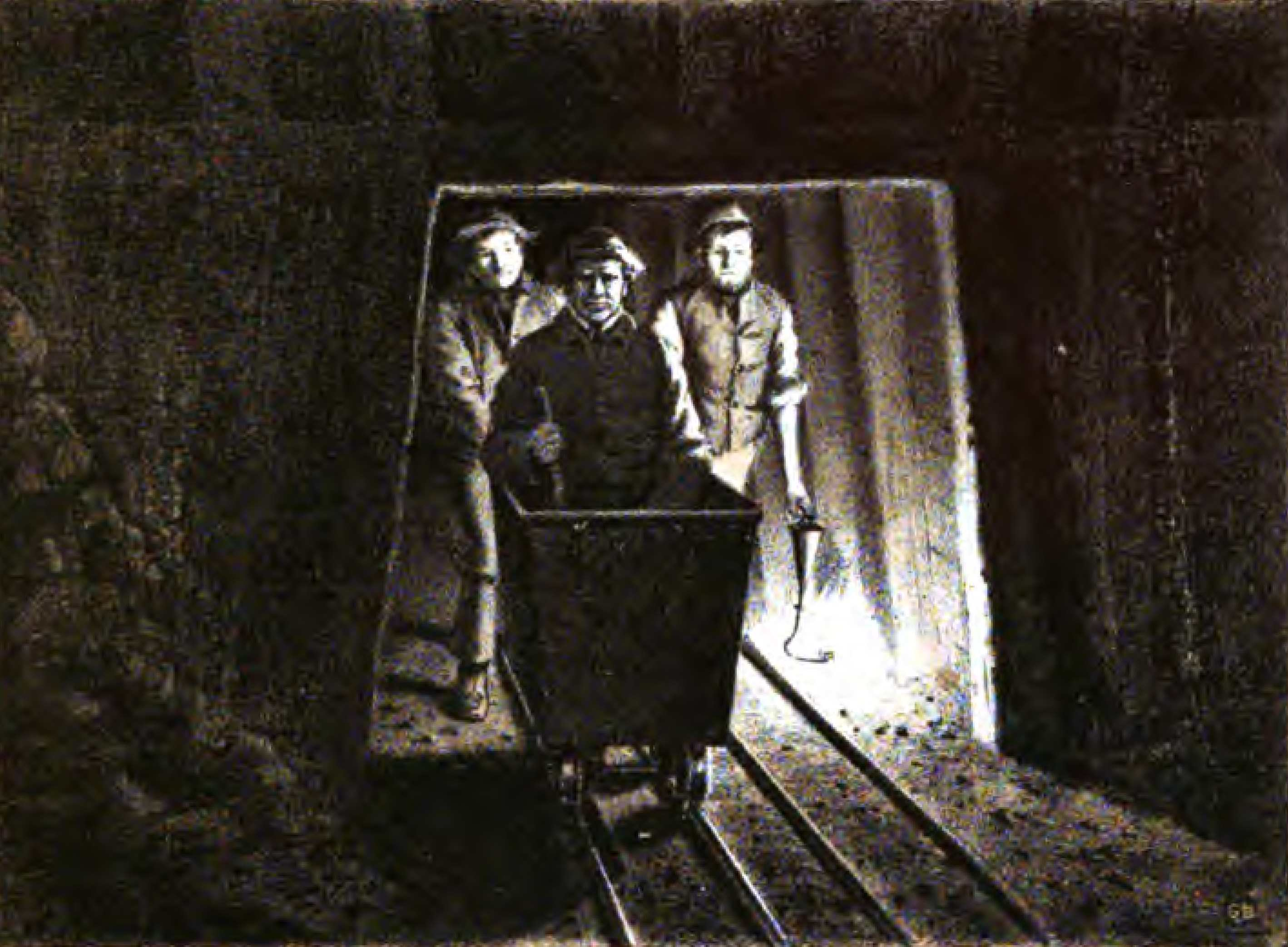
Sir John Hawkshaw (in cart) inspecting the Severn Tunnel during its construction

He was engineer, with Sir James Brunlees, of the original Channel Tunnel Company from 1872, but many years previously he had investigated for himself the question of a tunnel under the Strait of Dover from an engineering point of view, and had come to a belief in its feasibility, so far as that could be determined from borings and surveys. Subsequently, however, he became convinced that the tunnel would not be to the advantage of Great Britain, and thereafter would have nothing to do with the project. He was also consulting engineer to the Severn Tunnel, which, from its magnitude and the difficulties encountered in its construction, was one of the most notable engineering undertakings of the 19th century. Following the inundation of the tunnel working in 1879, he employed Thomas A. Walker as lead contractor to complete the work.

He also designed the famous Puerto Madero, the port of Buenos Aires, collaborating with Thomas A. Walker and James Murray Dobson. The works started its construction in 1885 and was finished in 1898.

He is also known for his construction of the Brighton sewerage system.

== Family ==
In 1835 he married Ann Jackson (d.1885). Ann and John had six children: Mary Jane Jackson (1838), Ada (1840), John Clarke (1841), who was also a civil engineer, Henry Paul (1843), Editha (1845), and Oliver (1846). Ada died of hydrocephalus in 1845. Oliver died in 1856 having contracted typhoid fever while the family were holidaying in Pitlochry, Scotland.

He died in London on 2 June 1891.

== Honours and awards ==
He was elected a Fellow of the Royal Society in June 1855.

In 1875, he was elected a Fellow of the Royal Society of Edinburgh. His proposers were David Stevenson, James Leslie, Thomas Stevenson and Henry Charles Fleeming Jenkin.

He served as president of the Institution of Civil Engineers between December 1861 and December 1863.

He was knighted in 1873.

He was elected an honorary member of the American Society of Civil Engineers in 1880.

A JD Wetherspoon pub located within Cannon Street station is named "The Sir John Hawkshaw".

Professional and academic associations
Preceded by George Parker Bidder	President of the Institution of Civil Engineers; December 1861 – December 1863	Succeeded by John Robinson McClean
