= Yaracuy (disambiguation) =

Yaracuy may refer to:

== Places ==
Venezuela

- Yaracuy, one of the 23 states which make up the country
- Yaracuy River

== Other uses ==
- Yaracuyanos FC, a Venezuelan football club
