= Chichiriviche =

Coastal city in Venezuela

- City
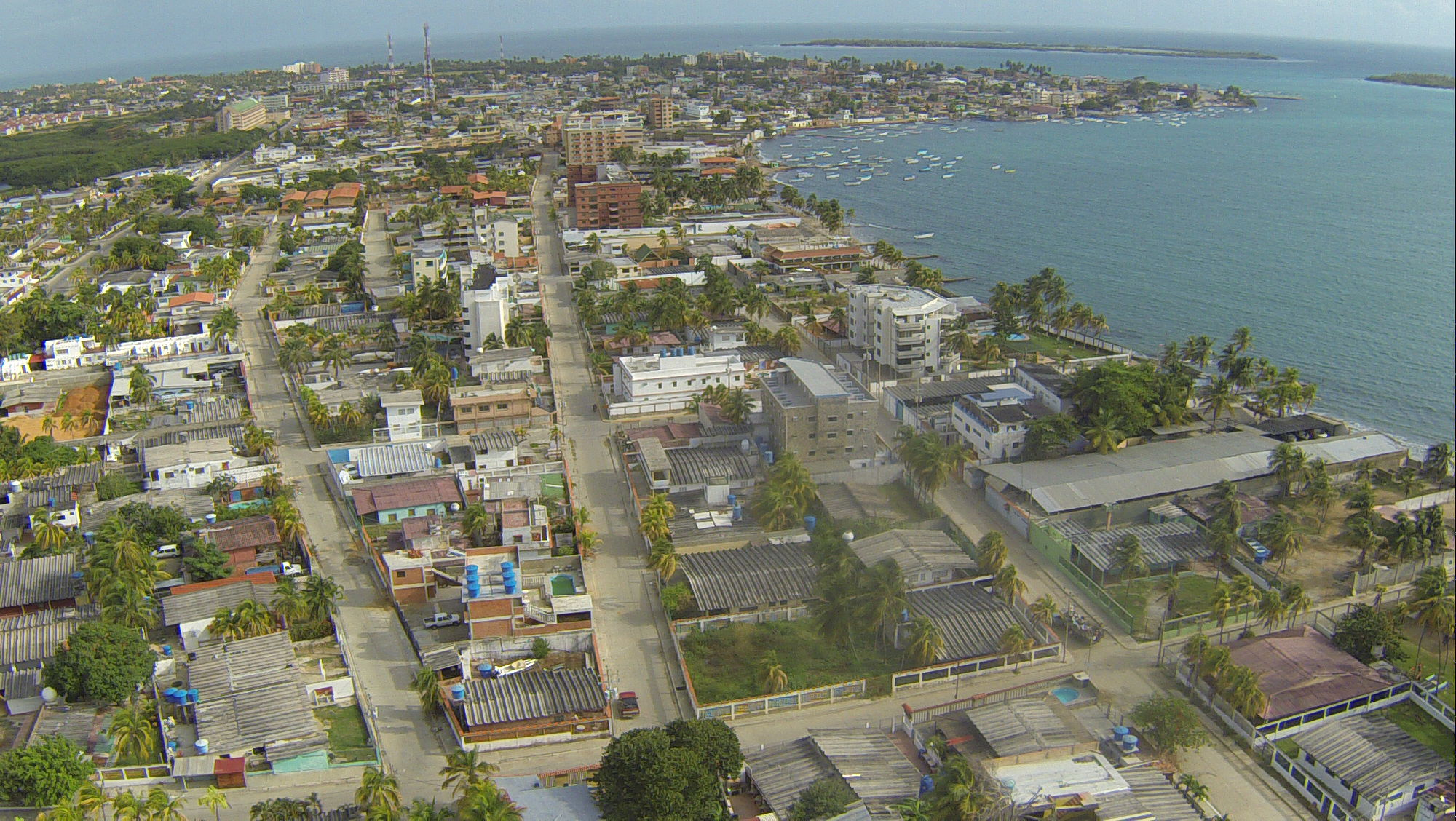

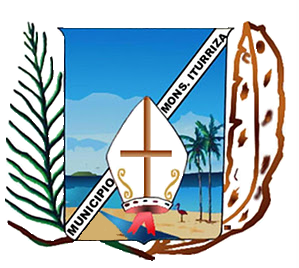
- Coat of arms

- Location within Venezuela
- Country: Venezuela
- State: Falcón
- Municipality: Monseñor Iturriza

Population (2011)
  - Total: 18,960
- Time zone: UTC-4:30 (UTC)
- area code: 0268

Chichiriviche, also known as Chichiriviche de la Costa, is a Venezuelan city located in Falcón state located on the east coast, 195 km southeast of Coro. It is the capital of Municipality Monseñor Iturriza and has a population of 18,960 inhabitants as of 2011.

Chichiriviche is surrounded by the small cays and islands of fine white sand; to the west by the wetland Cuare Wildlife Refuge and to the south by Cuare Gulf. Its name is a Caribbean word meaning "place where rises our sun"

Chichiriviche has achieved a sustained development of its tourism industry, with a service infrastructure that translates into luxury hotels, resorts, inns, restaurants, network of marinas, shops and places of nightlife.

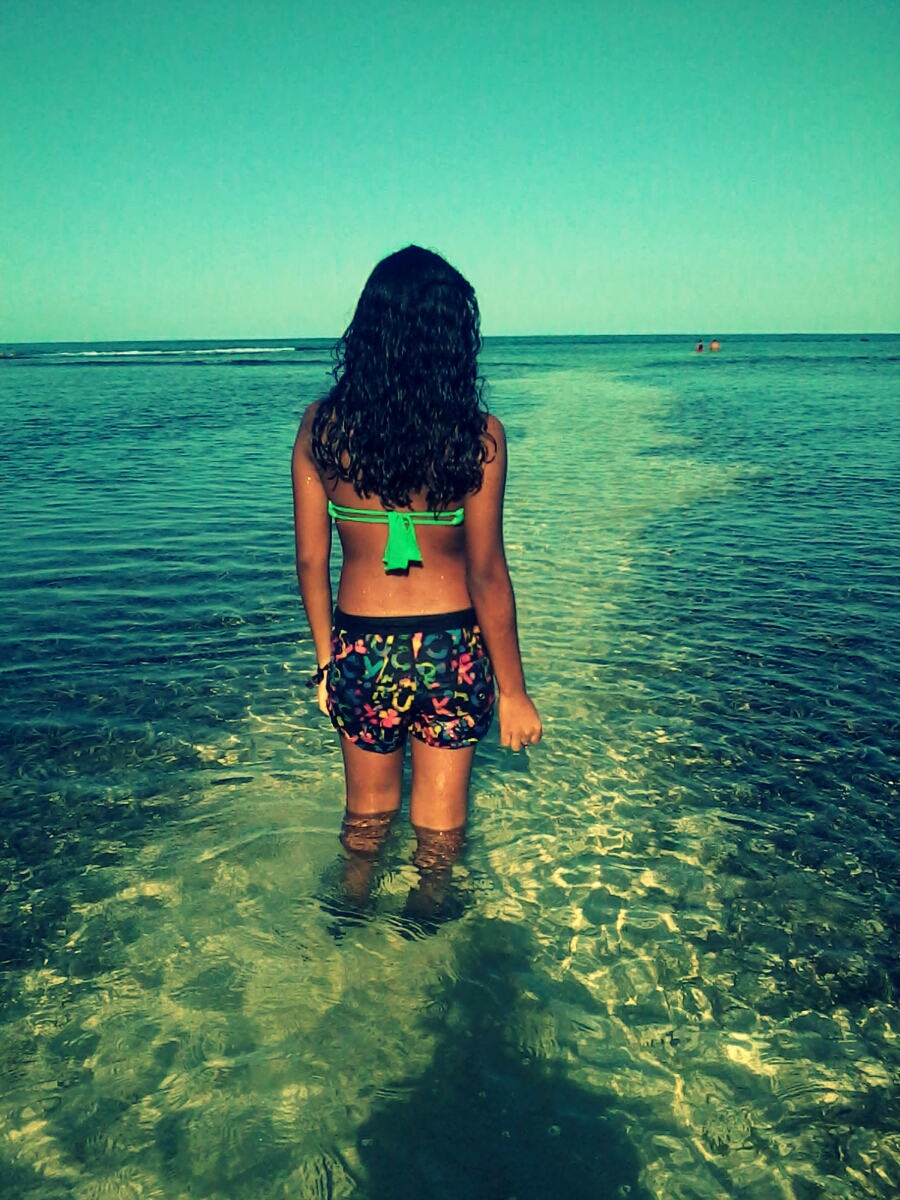
Cayo Muerto, one of the small islands in the town.

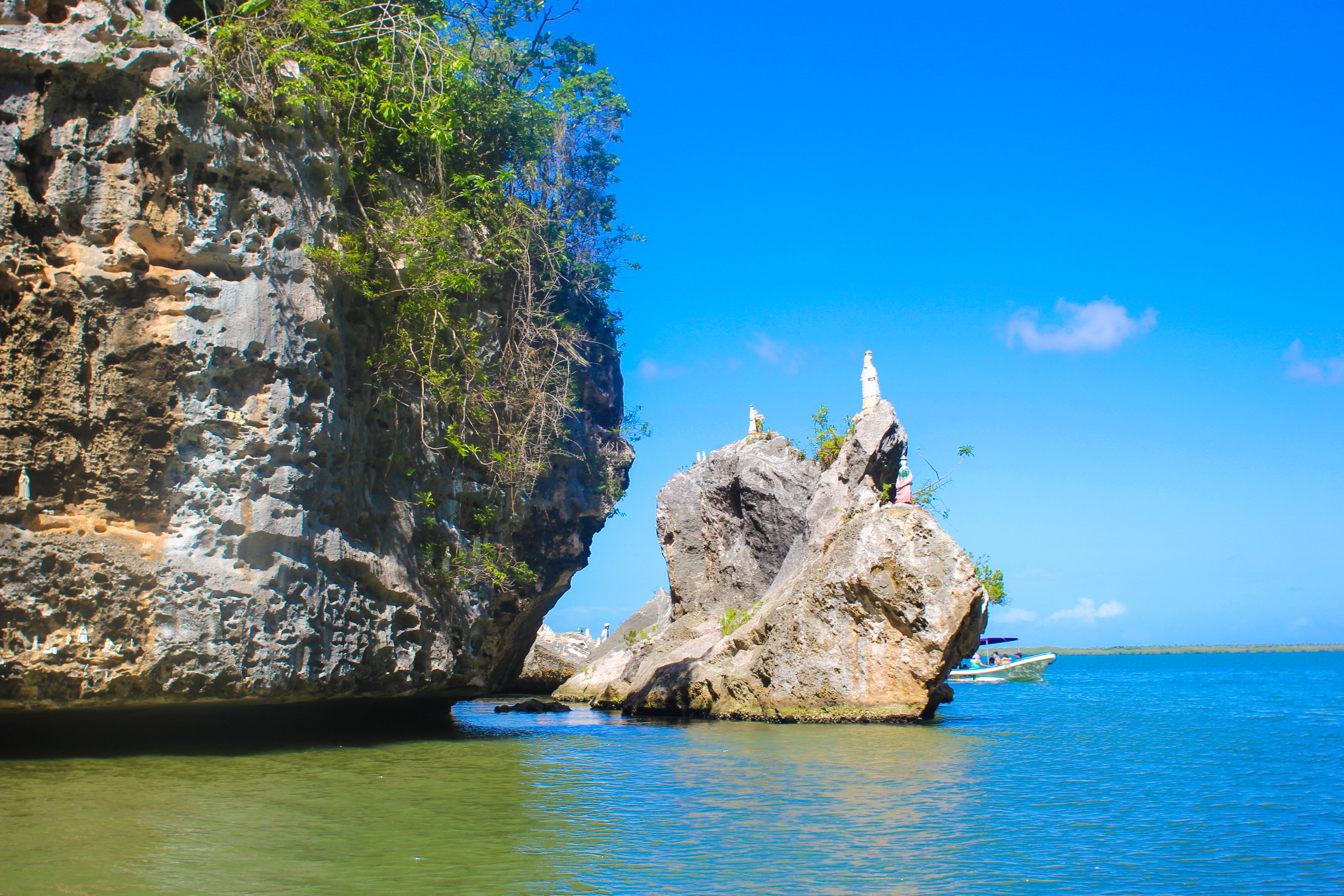
Gruta de la Virgen (Grotto of the Virgin)

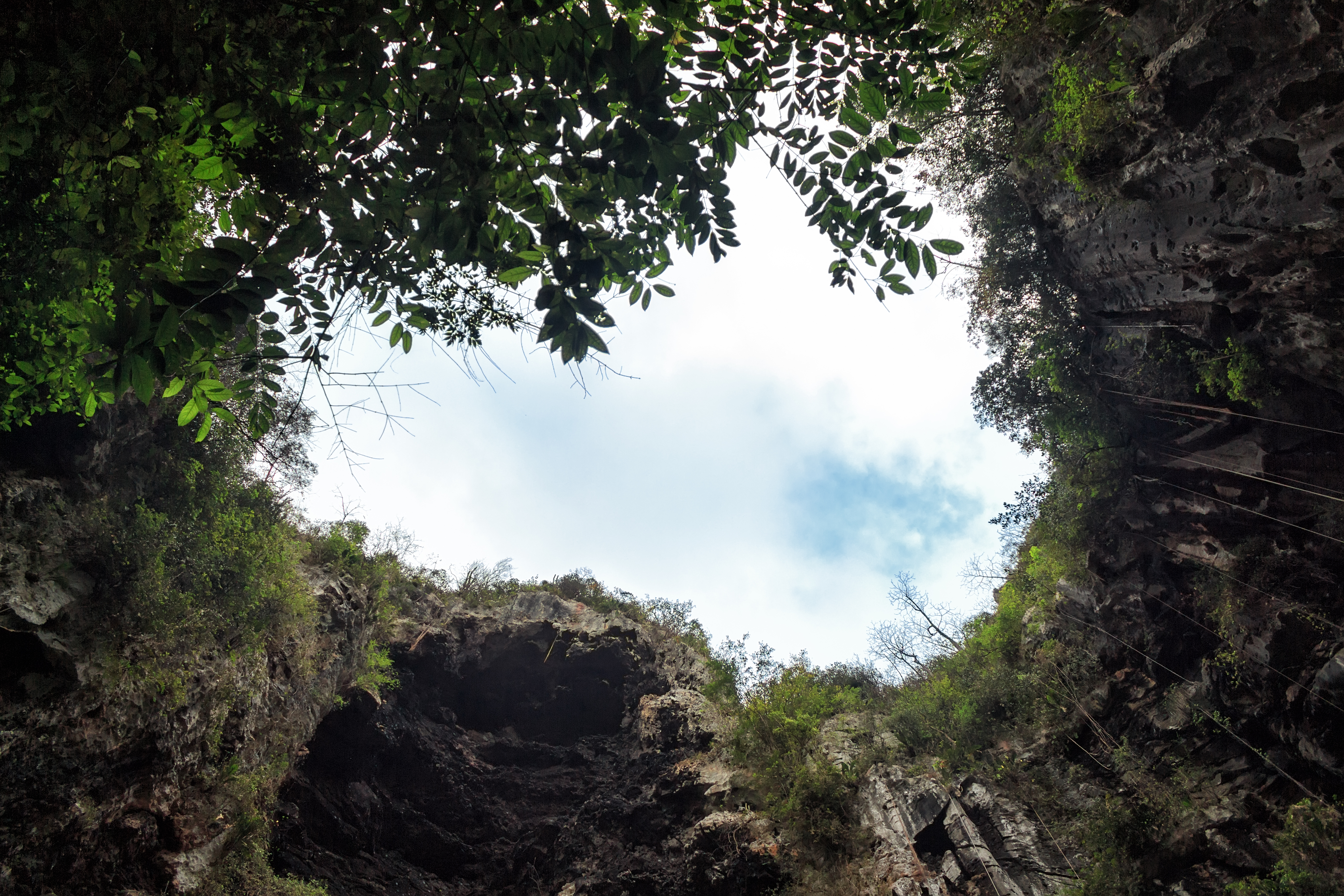
Cave del Indio

It is a tourist destination as well as a coconut farming and fishing town. A dish that has recently become common in Chichiriviche is ceviche made with lionfish; the lionfish is an invasive species and thus eating it serves both as a food source and a way of protecting the local environment.

== Geography ==
On the east side of Chichiriviche are five islands belonging to Morrocoy National Park, these are: Sal Cay, Muerto Cay, Pelón Cay, Peraza Cay and Sombrero Cay. To this is added the Continental Beach Punta Varadero.

To the west in the Cuare Wildlife Refuge, which serves as a habitat for various coastal marine birds.

On the south side opens the Cuare Gulf, rich in fish.

On the banks of gulf, on the cliff of Hill Chichiriviche is located a cave called Cueva del Indio with petroglyphs of more than 3500 years old. In this same area is the Grotto of the Virgin (Gruta de la Virgen), place of popular fervor, devotion and pilgrimage. With the mission to conserve aquatic environments, February 2, 1971 the member countries of the United Nations (UN) they approved on the shores of the Caspian Sea in the city of Ramsar, Iran, the first convention on Wetlands, reason it is leading to celebrate on this date the International Day of these ecosystems and this 2015 is commemorated under the theme Wetlands for our future.

== Events ==
The Conference of the Parties (COP) is the highest decision-making on the implementation of the Ramsar Convention, which meets every three years and its powers is the decision to include or exclude areas from the list of wetlands of international importance. Wetlands are considered the most productive ecosystems in the world, providing water and basic resource to the plant and animal species, including humans. These ecosystems, as well as being a source of biological diversity, also provide enormous economic benefits to mankind through fishing and maintaining the groundwater, which is of importance to agriculture, water storage and flood control, stability of coastlines, timber production, absorption of pollutants and water purification. These are also spaces for the development of recreational activities that make life possible on the planet.

Venezuela should be considered privileged by its special geographical condition of being at the same time Amazon, Andean, Atlantic, Caribbean, Llanos, Guianan and in the case of wetlands can highlight that the country's nine regions according to its basins are in the which are displayed about 24 categories of these ecosystems, for a total of 158 wetlands of special importance for its economic, social, cultural or ecological value. Five of these are on the list of Wetlands of International Importance or Ramsar sites. The first designated was the Cuare Wildlife Refuge (Falcón state), Los Roques archipelago (Federal Dependences), Ciénaga Los Olivitos Wildlife Refuge and Fishing Reserve (Zulia state), the Laguna de la Restinga National Park (Nueva Esparta state) and Laguna de Tacarigua National Park (Miranda state)

To the north are the inland waters of Norte Beach and Los Cocos Beach, with more than 5 km long; as well as marine waters of Borracho Cay, which is a refuge for migratory birds.

== Festivities ==
- March 19–21: Festivities in honor of St. Joseph
- July 16: Virgen del Carmen
- August 15–17: Coconut's Fair
- September 8: Virgen del Valle
- September 29: Fiestas in honor to patron St. Michael the Archangel
- October: Virgen de Fátima
