= Aroa, Venezuela =

Aroa
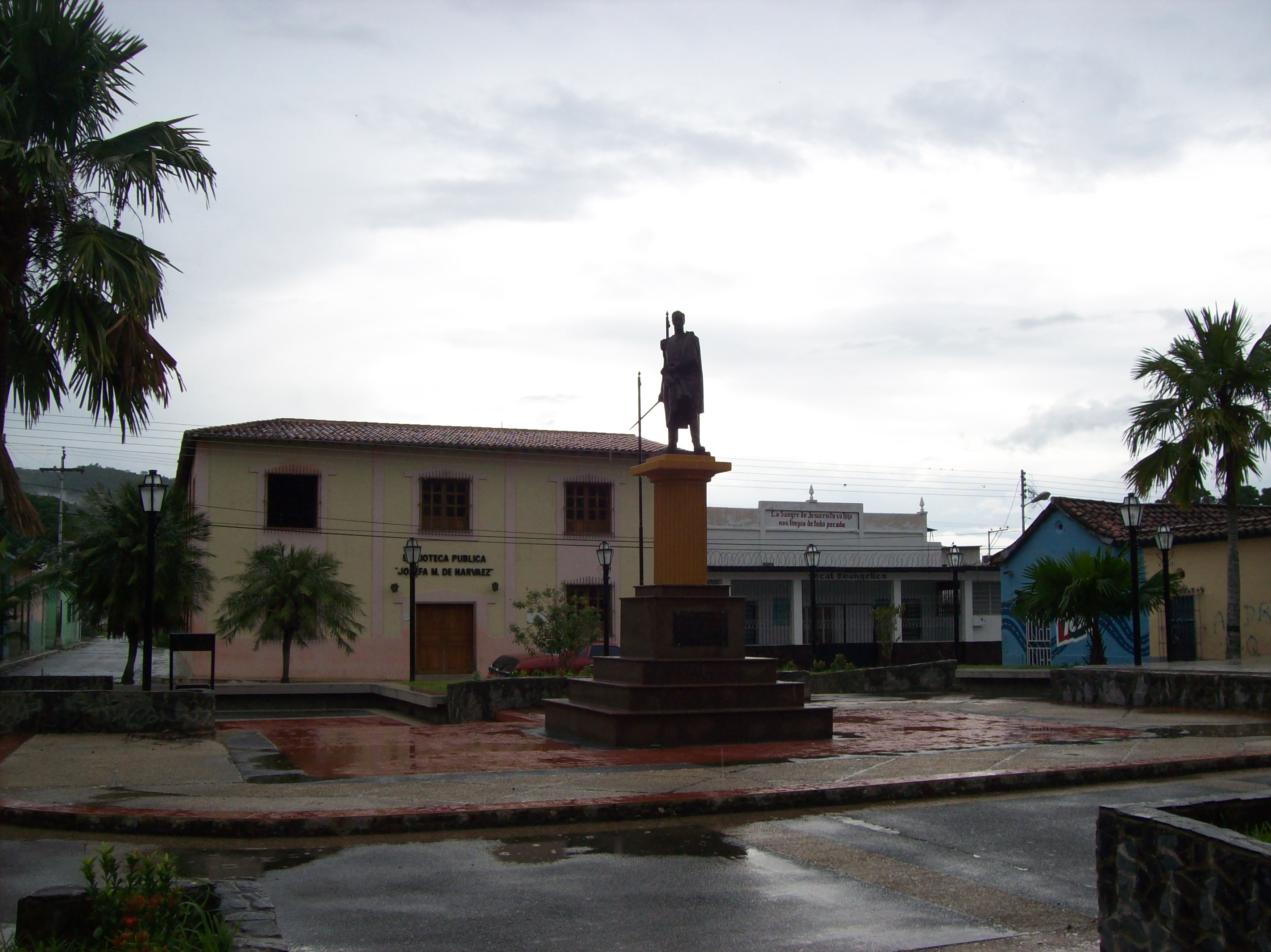

- Location within Venezuela
- Coordinates: 10.437919°N 68.894078°W
- Country: Venezuela
- State: Yaracuy
- Municipality: Bolívar

Aroa is the capital of the municipality of Bolívar in the state of Yaracuy, Venezuela. It grew up to serve the Aroa copper mines, now defunct.

== Geography ==
Aroa grew up to serve the Aroa mines, which are 4 kilometres (2.5 mi) east of the village of Aroa in the state of Yaracuy, about 220 kilometres (140 mi) west of Caracas and 83 kilometres (52 mi) from San Felipe, Yaracuy. The country is rugged, about 600 metres (2,000 ft) above sea level on the northern side of the Andes, which run from east to west,. The climate is warm and humid, and the area is covered in thick forest.

== History ==
Mining began in 1632, following gold veins, which led to discovery of large deposits of copper. Around the end of the 17th century the "Cobre Caracas" mining company became the property of the family of Simón Bolívar (1783–1830). The largest of the mines, La Vizcaina, was worked by 60 to 70 slaves. In 1824 Bolivar leased the mines to British entrepreneurs. The British employed about 1,200 workers in the mines, including British and Venezuelans. They used the Aroa River to carry the ore by barge to the coast, where it was loaded onto ships.

A narrow gauge line from Aroa to the port of Tucacas was opened in 1877. The Ferrocarril Bolívar was the first railway in Venezuela. Also in 1877 the road from Barquisimeto to Aroa was upgraded so it could be used by wagons and carts. In 1891 the railway was extended from Aroa via Duaca to Barquisimeto. Aroa was the first town in the country to obtain electricity and telephone service. A cableway was built linking the mines to the town. The mines were abandoned in 1936. The 9,000 hectares (22,000 acres) Parque Minas de Aroa (Aroa Mines Park) was created on 21 September 1974, containing the old mine workings.

== Sources ==
- Maddicks, Russell (2011-02-01), Venezuela: The Bradt Travel Guide, Bradt Travel Guides, ISBN 978-1-84162-299-6
- "Parque Bolivariano Minas de Aroa", Yaracuy, 21 May 2011
- Rodriguez, Simon E. (1 January 1974), Sulfur Isotopes In Sulfides From The Bailadores Ore Deposits, Venezuelan Andes, And The Aroa Mining District, Western Central Range, Venezuela, Organization: Society for Mining, Metallurgy & Exploration
- Silva, Ricardo (27 September 1993), An introduction to artificial cavities in Venezuela during the colonial period, Caracas: Centro de exploraciones espeleológicas de la Universidad Simón Bolívar, archived from the original on 2020-10-22
- Yarrington, Douglas (1997-12-15), A Coffee Frontier: Land, Society, and Politics in Duaca, Venezuela, 1830–1936, University of Pittsburgh Pre, ISBN 978-0-8229-7494-9
