= Cocorote =

- City
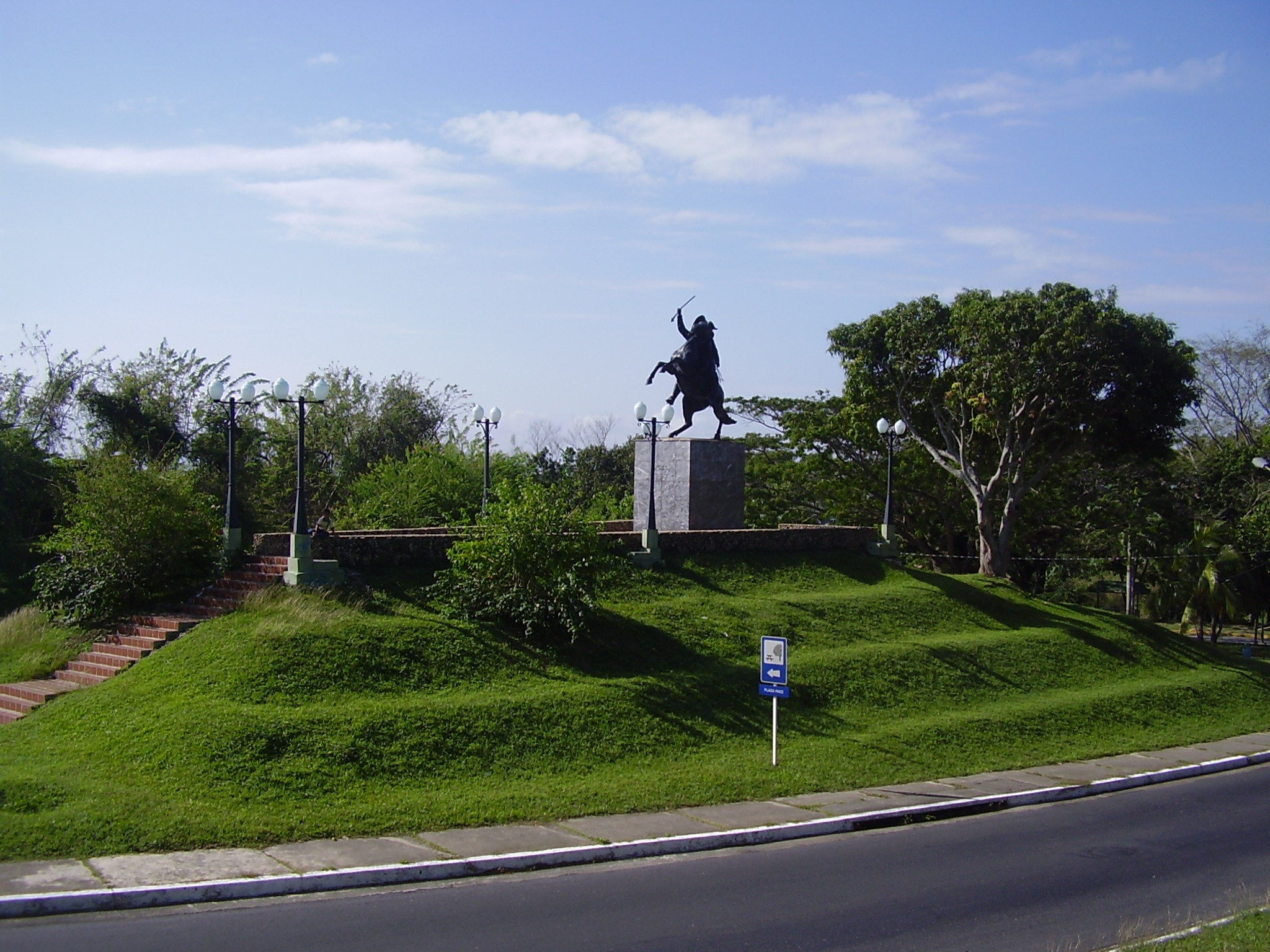
- A church in Cocorote

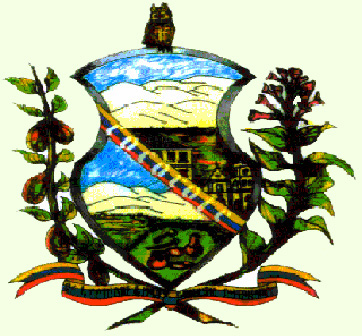
- Coat of arms

- Location in Venezuela
- Coordinates: 10°19′18″N 68°46′57″W
- Country: Venezuela
- State: Yaracuy
- Municipality: Cocorote

Government
  - Mayor: Amado Torres (PSUV)

Area
  - Total: 125 km^{2} (48 sq mi)
- Elevation: 424 m (1,391 ft)

Population (2011)
  - Total: 39,310
  - Density: 314/km^{2} (814/sq mi)
- Time zone: UTC−04:00 (VET)
- Postal code(s): 3201

Cocorote is a city in and the seat of the Cocorote Municipality in the state of Yaracuy, Venezuela.

The patron of the city is Saint Jerome.

Baseball is a popular sport in Cocorote, and there is a stadium located in the city.

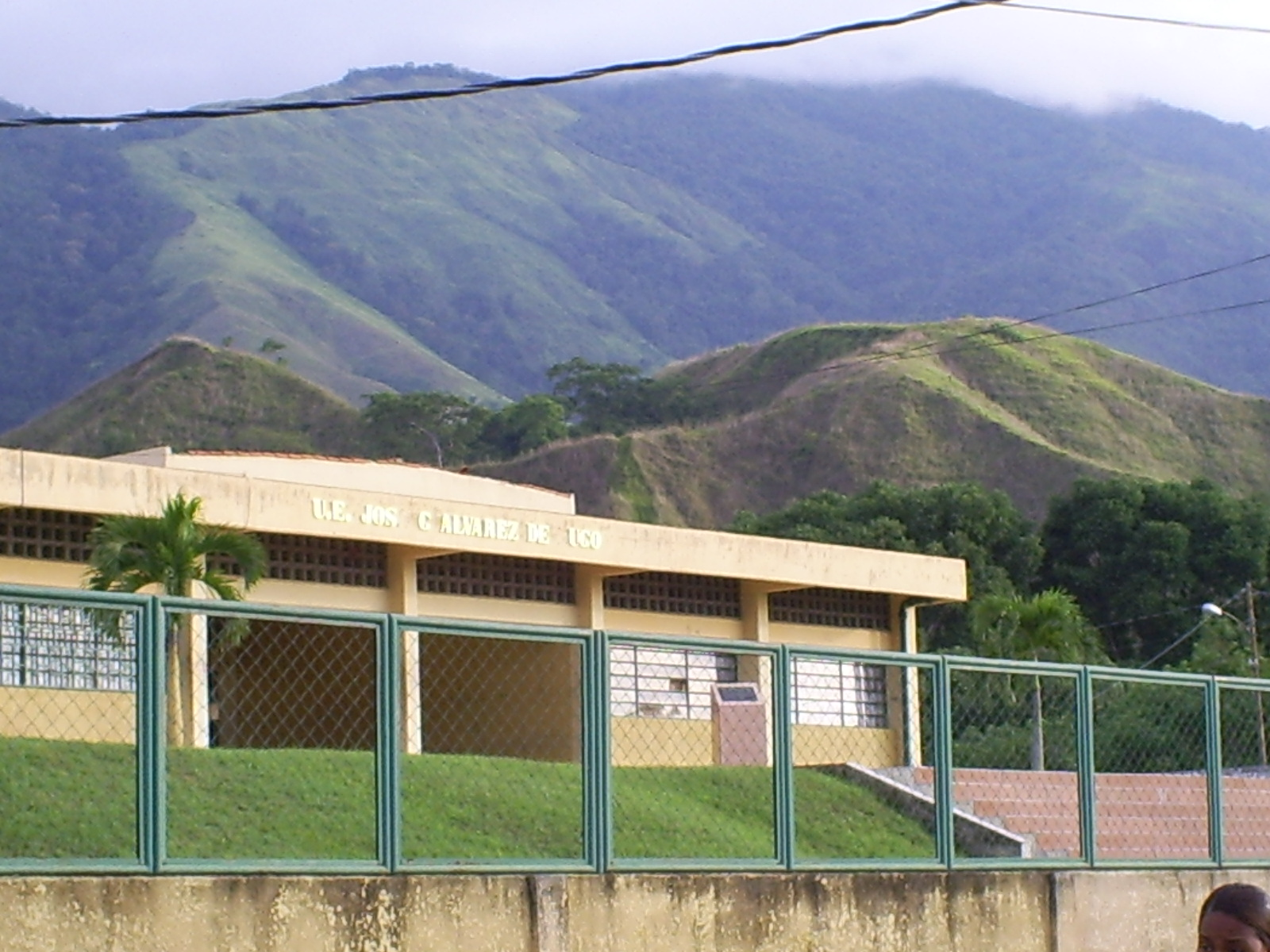
A school in Cocorote.
