= Morrocoy National Park =

Venezuelan protected area

- IUCN category II (national park)
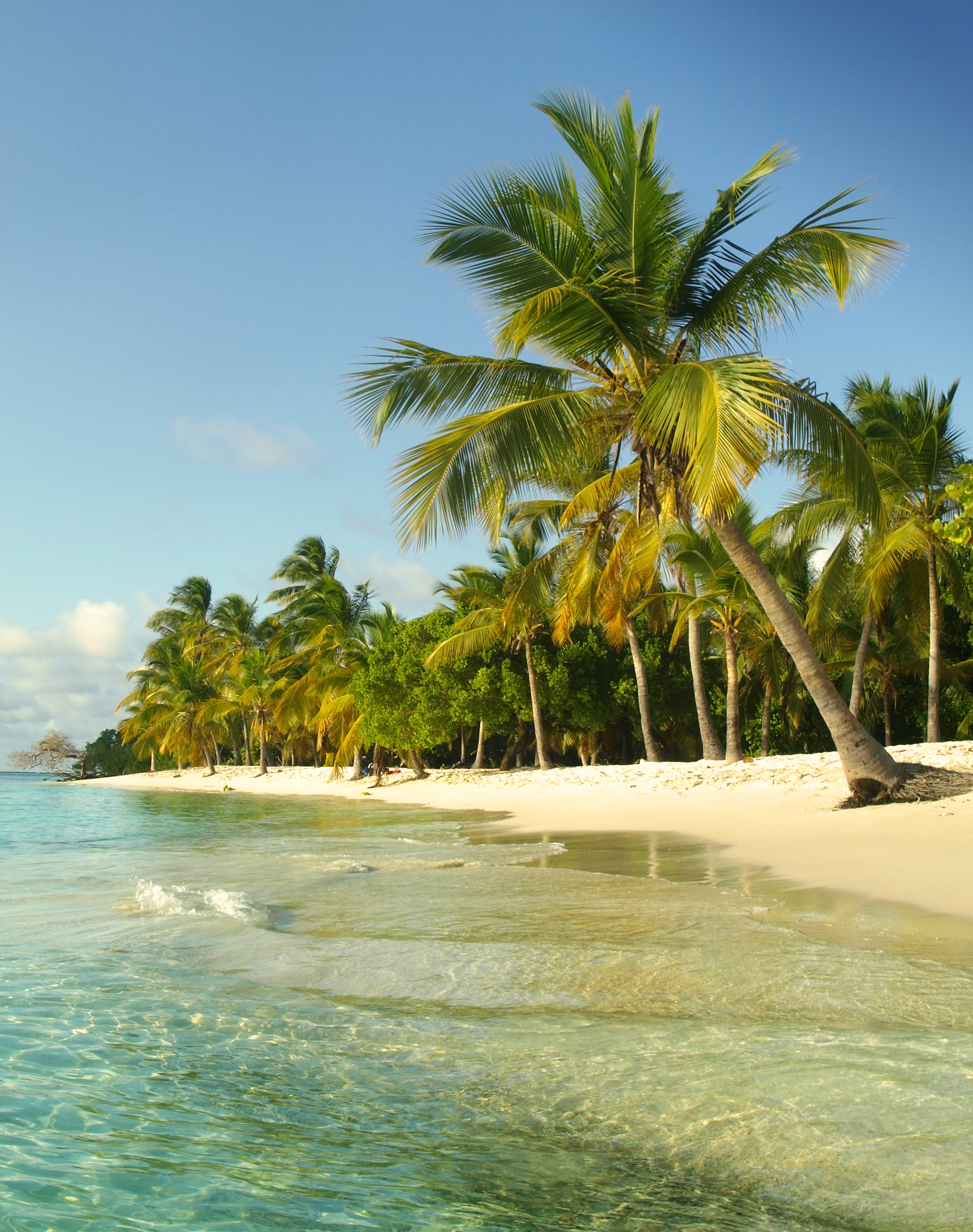
- Cay Sombrero

- Location within Venezuela
- Nearest city: Tucacas and Chichiriviche
- Coordinates: 10°51′22″N 68°18′22″W
- Area: 320.9 km^{2} (123.9 sq mi)
- Established: 26 May 1974
- Governing body: INPARQUES

Morrocoy National Park lies on the east coast of Falcón State and the north-west side of Golfo Triste, on the west central Venezuelan coast, near the towns of Boca de Aroa, Tucacas, Sanare, Chichiriviche, and Tocuyo de la Costa. It was declared a national park on 26 May 1974. The park's wildlife has suffered from human activity, and there has been a significant decline in coral species in recent years.

== Geography ==
The park extends across both terrestrial and aquatic areas of Golfo Triste. It covers 32,090 ha (79,300 acres). It contains an area of mangroves and numerous islets or cays, including Borracho, Muerto, Sombrero, Sal, Las Animas, and Peraza. White sand beaches on these cays include Mero, Paiclas, Los Juanes, Playuela, Tucupido, Azul and Boca Seca.

The park's bays, mangroves, cays and islands sit in the shadow of the Chichiriviche hills, with elevations up to around 250 m. At 285 m high, Chichiriviche Hill is the highest point in the park. It stands amid the surrounding coastal environment of Tertiary-period coral origin, belonging to the Capadare - Agua Linda limestone geological formation.

=== Climate ===
The warm tropical climate is influenced by the north-east trade winds, with low rates of precipitation. Temperatures are relatively uniform throughout the year between 27 and 35 °C. In cold weather, it can drop to between 23-26 °C. The rainiest period extends from August to December, particularly in November and December.

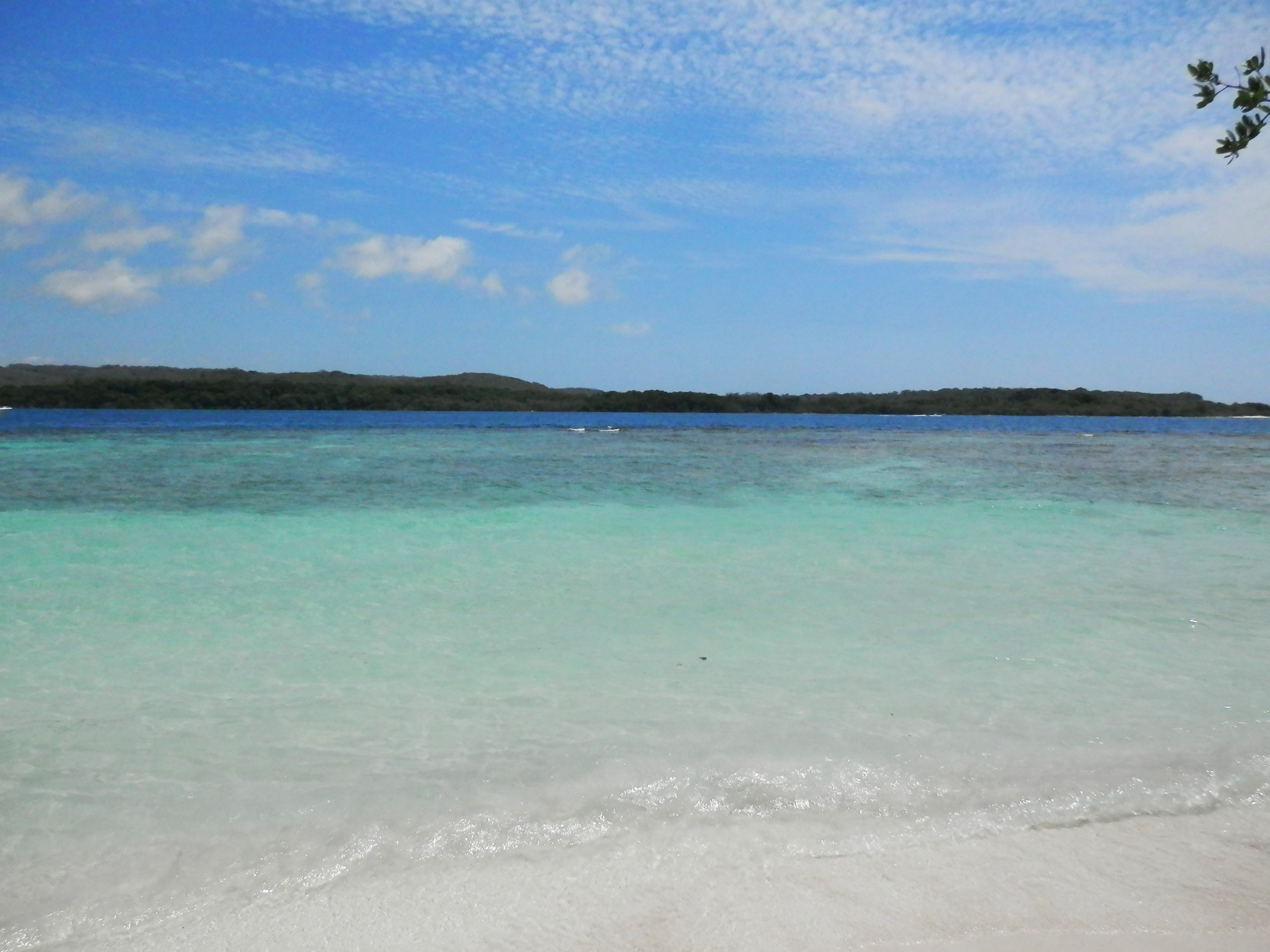
The clear waters of the Caribbean, Morrocoy National Park

== Environment ==
=== Flora ===
The flora corresponds to the area of tropical dry forests. The vegetation is quite varied and is closely associated with geomorphological positions, the most important subsets being the coast, coastal lagoons, marshes, saline shoals, cays and shallow seabed. It ranges from evergreen plants, such as olives, to deciduous plants such as Bursera simaruba. Plants, such as glass grass, are adapted to high salinity soils. Continuing toward Mayorquina on the eastern slopes of the Chichiriviche hills, the xerophytic vegetation of the cactus family can be seen.

Red, black, white and buttonwood mangroves are the dominant vegetation and landscape of the park and form a unit that preserves the ecologically fragile balance of the coastline in an area of about 4,500 ha. Among the underwater marine growth is a wide variety of algae as well as seagrass, a favorite food of the green turtle.

=== Fauna ===
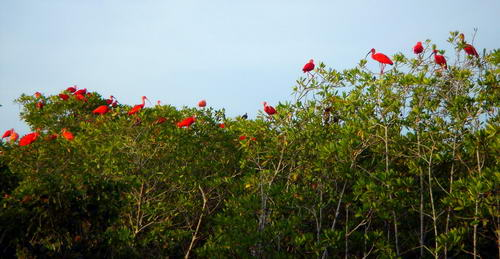
Scarlet ibises roosting in the park

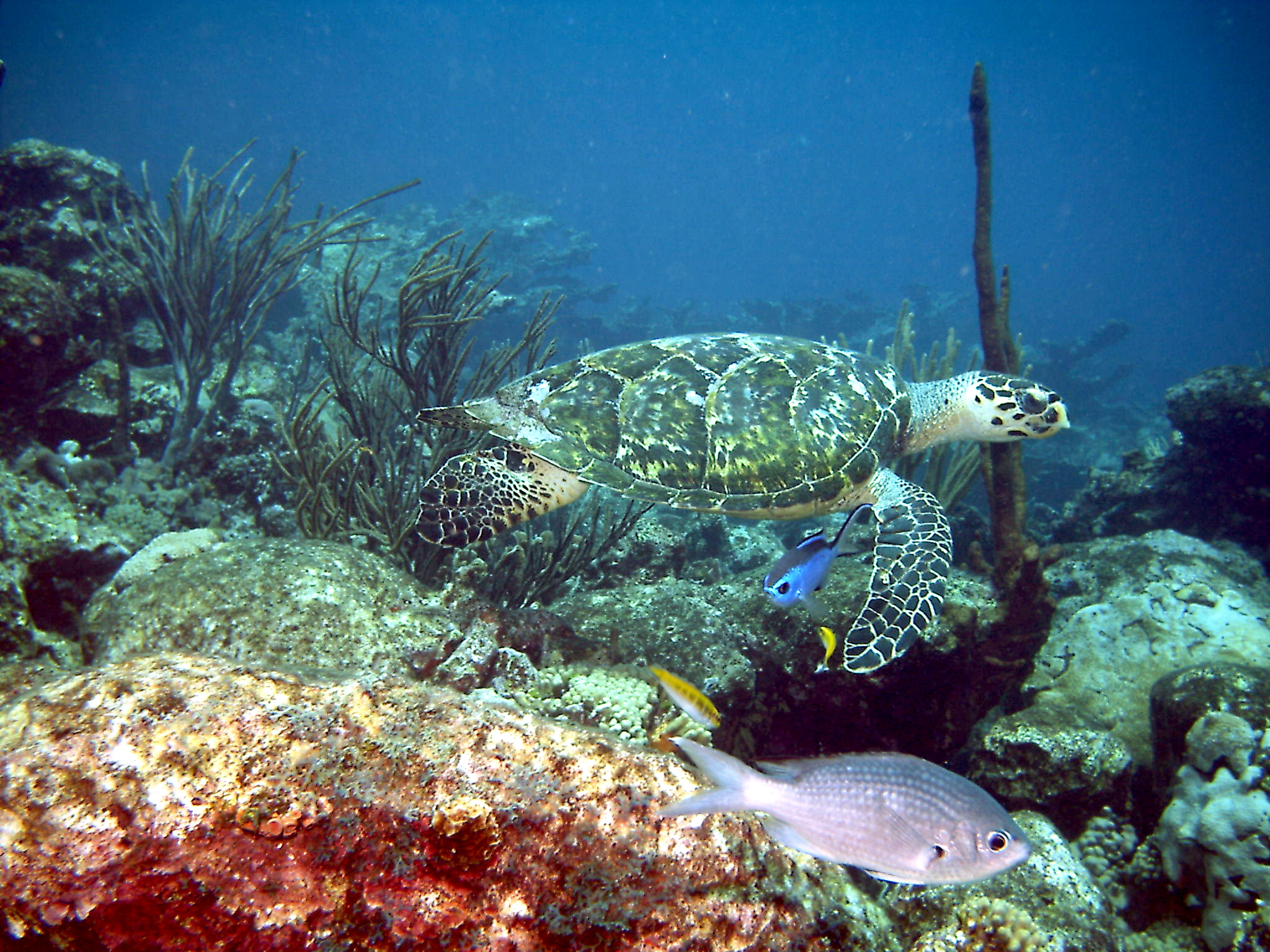
Reef fauna in the park

The park is inhabited by about 266 species of birds, as reported by the Cuare Wildlife Refuge. Because Morrocoy National Park and Wildlife Refuge Cuare are located in the same geographic area, it is inferred that the avifauna has a similar composition. Some notable bird species are the osprey; vulnerable species such as American flamingo, tricolored heron and brown pelican; species whose preferred habitat is the mangrove such as neotropic cormorant, snowy egret, scaled piculet, orange-winged amazon and scarlet ibis; and species with restricted distribution such as the magnificent frigatebird.

The mangroves of Morrocoy Bay act as bird sanctuaries, especially on the mangrove-covered island of Pájaros in the central area of the park. Morrocoy has been designated an Important Bird Area (IBA) by BirdLife International because it supports significant populations of many bird species.

Mammals include the dolphins and whales that use the park as a refuge. Land mammals are found mainly in the Chichiriviche Hill area, including brocket and white-tailed deer, anteaters, crab-eating foxes, howler monkeys, three-toed sloths, opossums, pacas, agoutis and peccaries. Marine reptiles include various turtle species such as green, hawksbill, leatherback and olive ridley sea turtles as well as the American crocodile, all considered threatened.

Fish breeding in the park include grouper, snapper, corvina, tarpon, snook, toadfish, school shark, sardines, mackerel, grunt, barracuda and the many species that inhabit the coral reefs. Shellfish species are the mangrove oyster, sea hares, quigua, spiny lobsters (Panulirus argus and Panulirus guttatus), blue and red crabs and other species. There is also a diverse range of insects.

== Access ==
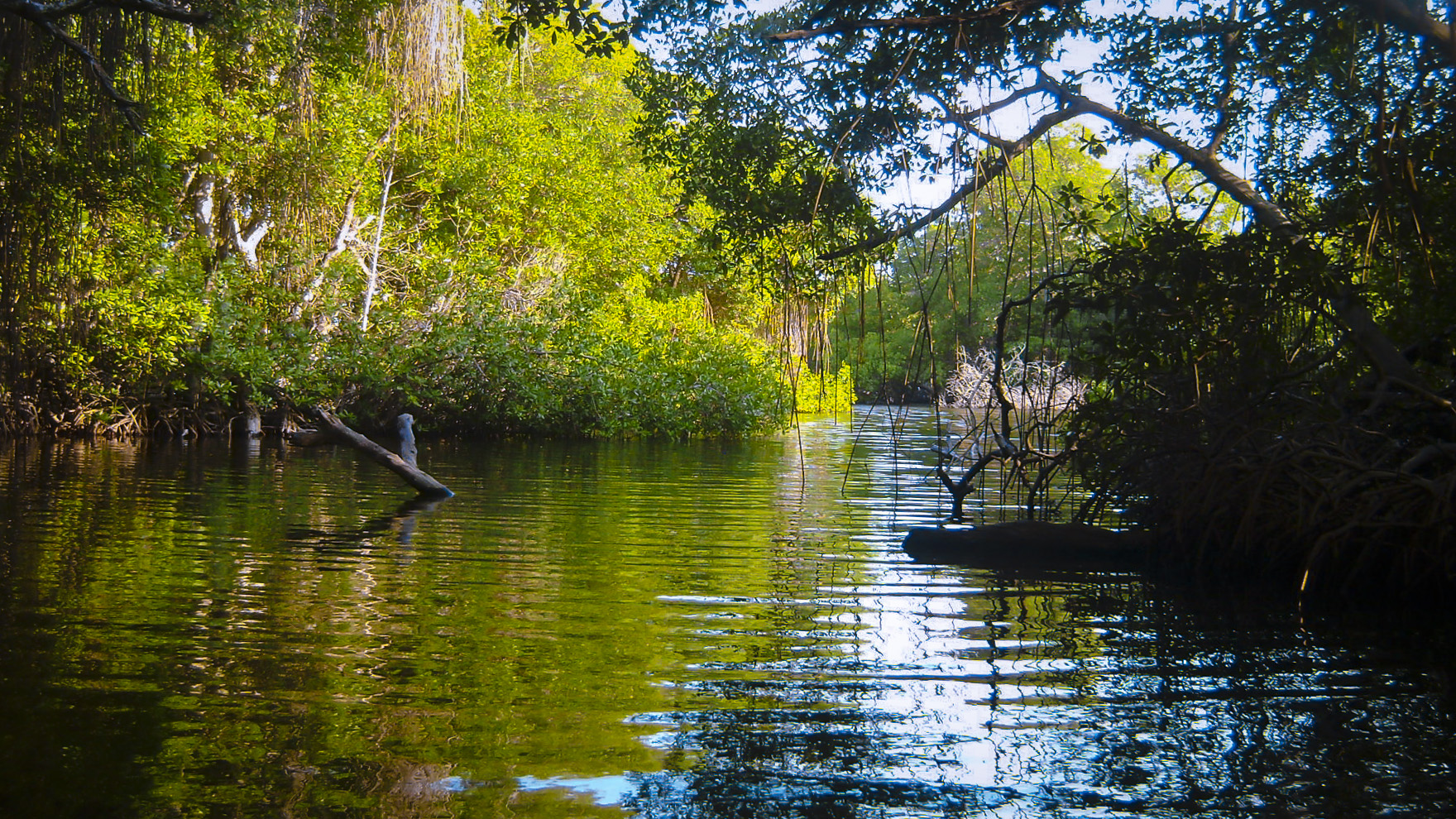
In the mangroves

From Caracas, one takes the Central Regional Highway past Guacara (approximately 140 km). A variant is taking the highway via Yagua to Puerto Cabello. In the Morón, one takes the highway Morón-Tucacas and, after traveling 40 km, one reaches the entrance to Morrocoy National Park.

=== Tourist activities ===
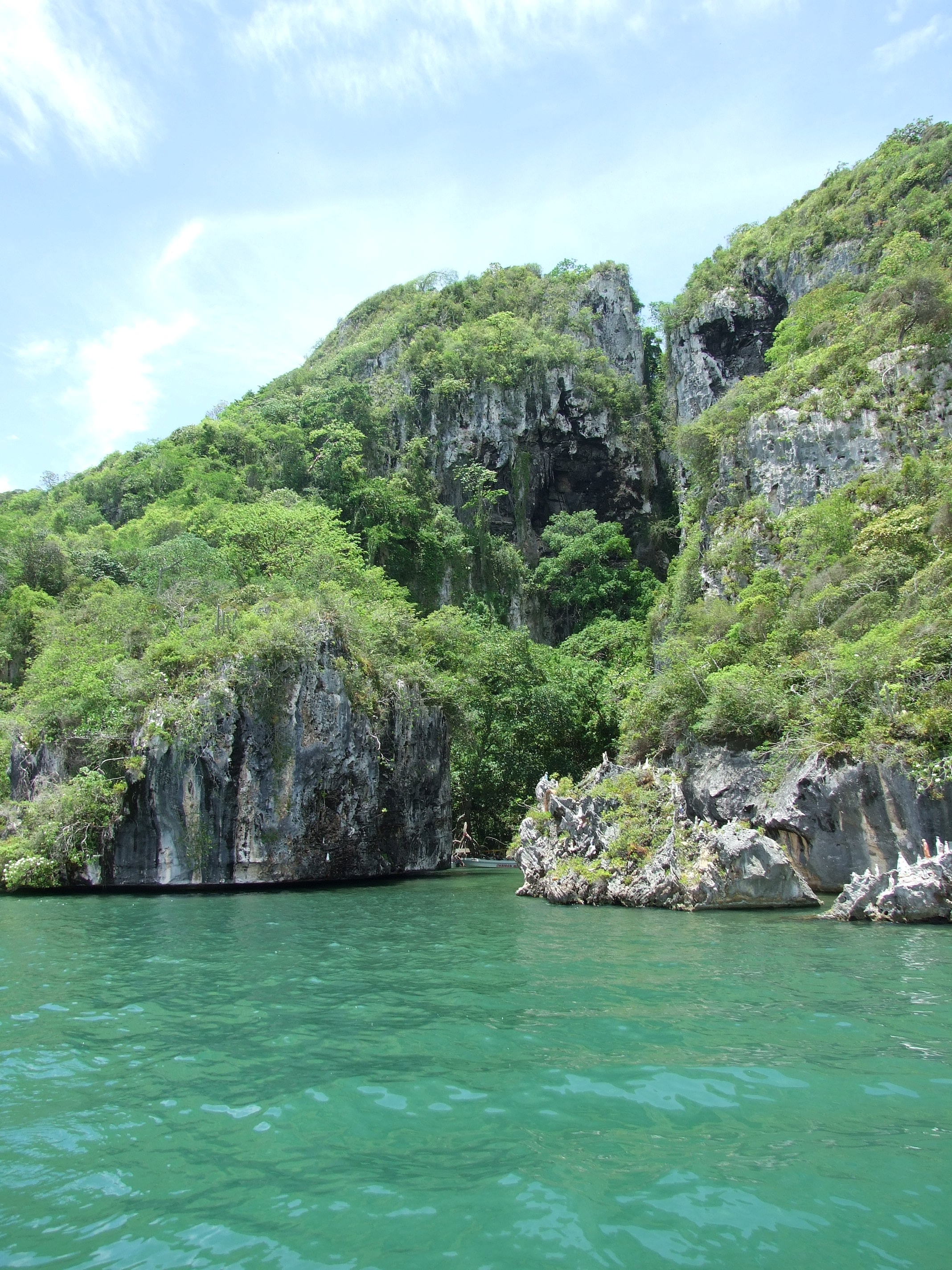
Cave of the Holy Virgin

Morrocoy National Park has a wide range of landscapes. Beaches include Sombrero Cay, Playuela, Playuelita, Alemán Cay, Mayorquina, Pescadores Cay, Mero Beach, Punta Brava, Boca Paiclás, Boca Seca, Los Juanes, Bajo Caimán, Tucupido, Sal Cay and Borracho Cay. Three islets outside the area of the park, Norte, Medio Cay, and Sur Cay, about 13 km (8 mi) from Tucacas, are in a Special Protection Area.

=== Los Juanes ===
Los Juanes is part of Morrocoy National Park, with access only by sea by private boat or small fishing boat. It has two islands ideal for snorkeling over coral reefs and among mangroves.

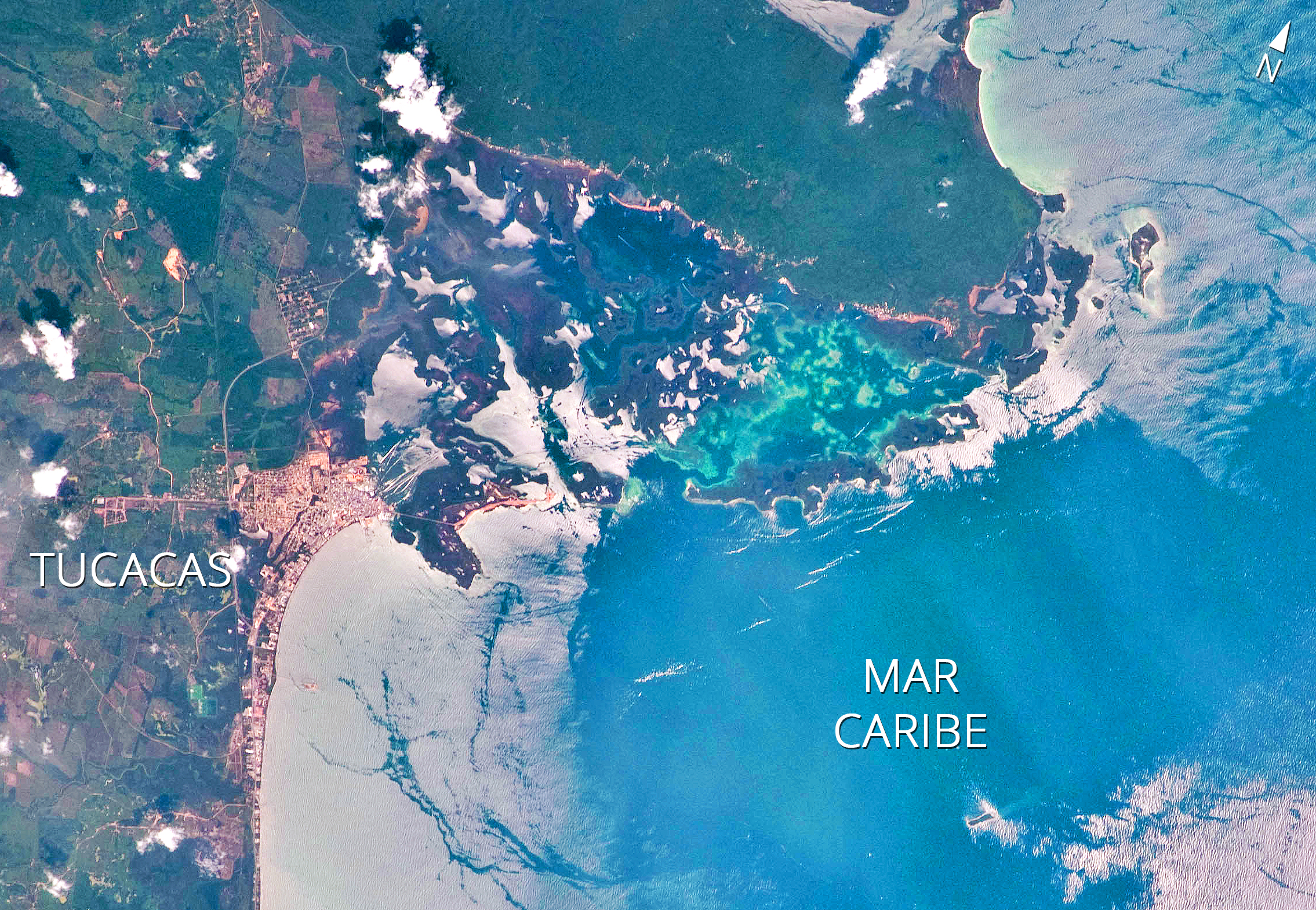
Aerial view of the park. We can see the mangroves area to the east of Tucacas
