= Tocuyo de la Costa =

- Coordinates: 11°02′N 68°23′W

Tocuyo de la Costa is a town located in Falcón State, Venezuela, near the beaches of Parque National Morrocoy. Located on the banks of Tocuyo River, about 4.64 miles from its mouth in the Caribbean Sea, in the Autonomous Municipality Monsignor Iturriza on the east coast of Falcón State, Venezuela, near the Cuare Wildlife Refuge and Morrocoy National Park.

== First Settlers ==
It is thought that the first settlers were the indigenous tribe of Mapubares because the Mission Indians Mapubares were established on the hills near the towns of El Alto and Santa Rosa. Until a few years ago the ruins of the settlements could have been seen. There may have also been Aboriginal settlements on the small hills near the town of La Villa, San Juan de los Cayos. As time passed, the aboriginal people mixed with the Spanish colonists and slaves brought from Africa. Subsequently, European immigrants, primarily from Spain and Italy, established themselves in the area.

In Raíces de Pueblo, written by Professor Jose Antonio Zabala Zambrano, it is noted that the population of San Miguel River Tocuyo (as it was called) started in 1560, based on the following facts. When the cathedral was constructed in Coro (1583-1637), the wood that was used for this purpose was taken from the surrounding mountains. The wood was thrown to the river, then later, with the ocean currents, carried around de la Vela de Coro or the dunes. In the year 1561, the Captaincy organized a small army that left in pursuit of Coro Tirano Aguirre. When they were quartered in the town of San Miguel de Rio Tocuyo, they were informed that Lope de Aguirre had been settled in the area Barquisimeto. Then, from this same population, those government troops returned to the city of Coro. Ramon Rivero, chronicler of the municipality concerned stated: "Just one year after the discovery of the coast of the new world strong in 1498, comes another expedition of Spaniards commanded by Don Alonso de Ojeda. Supporting among others Juan de la Cosa and Amerigo Vespucci. This expedition began its journey from east to west on our shores starting in the Sea of Pearls from the Paria peninsula and the island of Hawaii. After crossing the Gulf Sad, the climbers arrive at a beautiful bay that called attention to poderosamente the security offered by their calm waters.
