= Aroa River (Venezuela) =

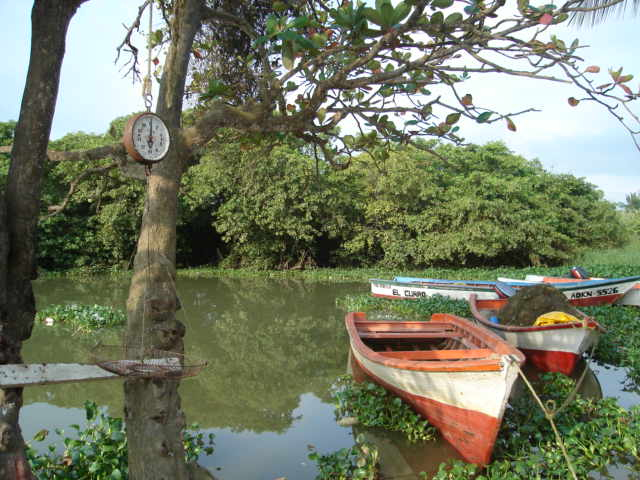

- Location within Venezuela
- Native name: río Aroa (Spanish)

Location
- Country: Venezuela

Physical characteristics
- Mouth
  - location: Boca de Aroa, Falcón, Venezuela
  - coordinates: 10.684818°N 68.296895°W

The Aroa River (Spanish: Río Aroa) is a river in northwestern Venezuela. It runs parallel and west of the Yaracuy River. The Aroa River empties into the Caribbean Sea.

The river drains part of the Lara-Falcón dry forests ecoregion.

In the 16th century it was known that there was gold in the Yaracuy, Santa Cruz and Aroa rivers, and in 1605 gold deposits were found in a small valley leading to the Aroa River. The king gave the Aroa mines in perpetuity to Dr. Francisco Marín de Narváez and his heirs in exchange for 40,000 pesos.

In 1824 the mines were leased to British entrepreneurs who exploited deposits of copper. They used the Aroa River to carry the ore by barge to the coast, where it was loaded onto ships. The town of Aroa was the first town in the country to obtain electricity and telephone service. A cableway was built linking the mines to the town.

== Sources ==
- Locklin, Claudia, Northern South America: Northern Venezuela (NT0219), WWF: World Wildlife Fund
- Maddicks, Russell (2011-02-01), Venezuela: The Bradt Travel Guide, Bradt Travel Guides, ISBN 978-1-84162-299-6
- "Parque Bolivariano Minas de Aroa", Yaracuy, 21 May 2011
- Silva, Ricardo (27 September 1993), An introduction to artificial cavities in Venezuela during the colonial period, Caracas: Centro de exploraciones espeleológicas de la Universidad Simón Bolívar, archived from the original on 2020-10-22
- Yarrington, Douglas (1997-12-15), A Coffee Frontier: Land, Society, and Politics in Duaca, Venezuela, 1830–1936, University of Pittsburgh Pre, ISBN 978-0-8229-7494-9
