= Benjamin Hawkshaw =

Benjamin Hawkshaw (died 1738) was an Irish Anglican divine.

== Life ==
Hawkshaw was born in Dublin, and entered Trinity College, Dublin in 1687. He left Ireland upon the revolution, and entered St. John's College, Cambridge, graduating B.A. there in 1691. He subsequently returned to Dublin, where he proceeded B.A. in 1693 and M.A. two years afterwards. He took orders, and was appointed to the parish of St. Nicholas-within-the-Walls at Dublin, a rectory in the gift of the Corporation of Dublin. Hawkshaw held four rectories in North Tipperary, in the Diocese of Killaloe (Nenagh, Monsea, Kneagh (Knigh), Killodiernan from 1720 to 1738, and may also have held two rectories in diocese of Kilmacud. He died in 1738.

== Works ==
Hawkshaw was author of an octavo volume entitled Poems upon Several Occasions, which was ‘printed by J. Heptinstall for Henry Dickinson, Bookseller in Cambridge,’ in 1693. In the dedicatory letter to ‘the Learned and Ingineous Dr. Willoughby,’ prefixed to the volume, the poet describes his effusions as ‘the essays but of a very young pen, a few by-thoughts in my vacancies from Irish studies.’ He also published in 1709 The Reasonableness of constant Communion with the Church of England represented to the Dissenters.
