= John Clarke Hawkshaw =

British civil engineer (1841–1921)

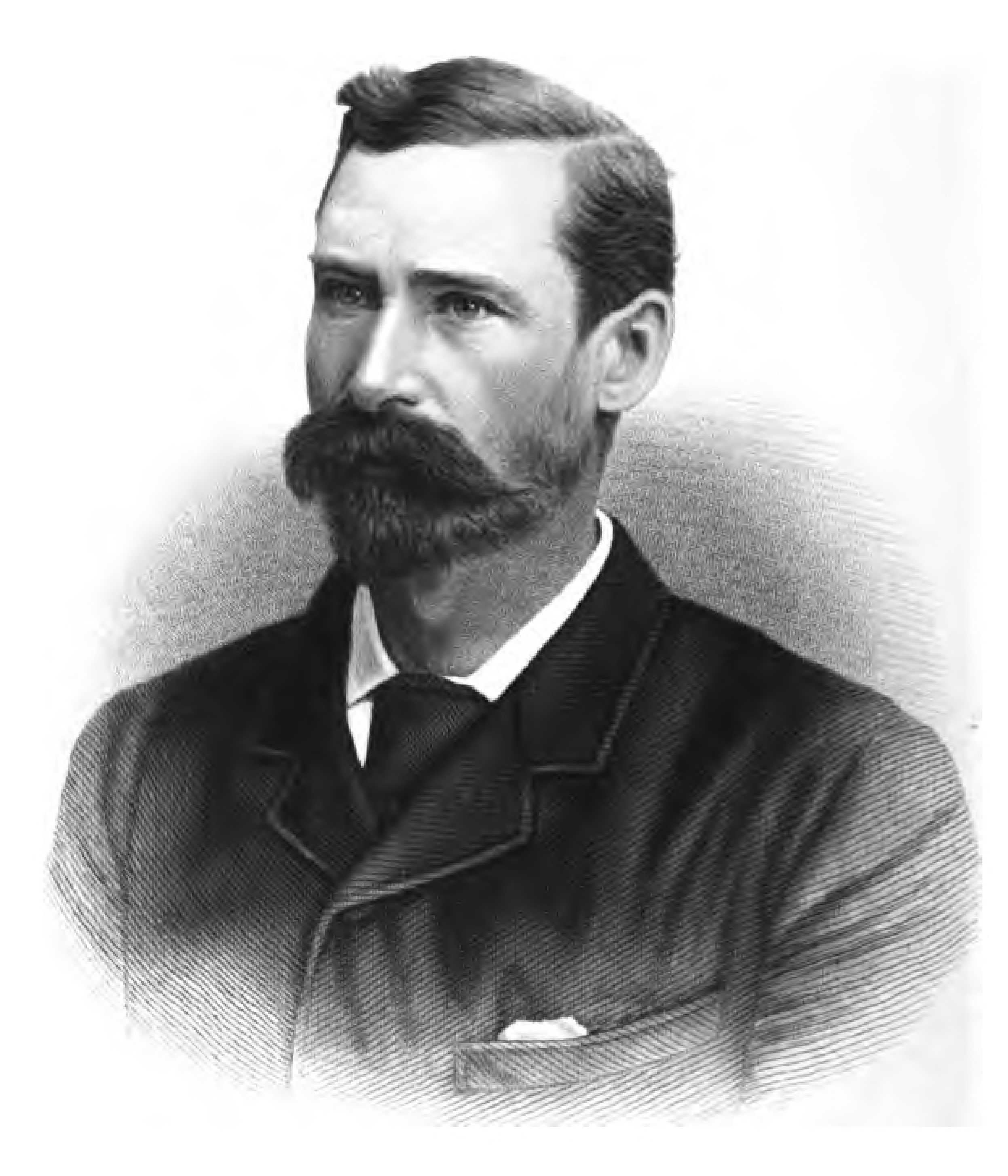
- J. Clarke Hawkshaw. Steel engraving by W. H. Gibbs from a photograph by Witcomb
- Born: 17 August 1841
- Died: 12 February 1921 (aged 79)
- Engineering career
- Discipline: Civil
- Institutions: Institution of Civil Engineers (president)

John Clarke Hawkshaw (7 August 1841 – 12 February 1921) was a British civil engineer.

== Biography ==
Hawkshaw was born in Manchester, England in 1841 and was the son of civil engineer Sir John Hawkshaw and Lady Ann Hawkshaw. He attended Westminster School and Trinity College, Cambridge, where he was president of the University Boat Club and rowed in the annual Boat Race against Oxford University in 1863 and 1864. On 9 December 1862 John Clarke Hawkshaw was commissioned as an ensign in the Third Cambridgeshire Rifle Volunteer Corps a Volunteer Force unit stationed at Cambridge University. He resigned his commission as ensign in the unit on 1 December 1863. Hawkshaw graduated with a Master of Arts degree and lived at Liphook in Hampshire. By 1876 Hawkshaw was a partner in his father's civil engineering firm.

In March 1876 Hawkshaw was elected a member of the Smeatonian Society of Civil Engineers, an institution that he would become president of in 1889. He served as the 39th president of the Institution of Civil Engineers from November 1902 to November 1903. In holding that office he followed in the footsteps of his father who had been the 11th president from December 1861 to December 1863. The largest civil engineering project undertaken by the firm which was initiated by John Clarke Hawkshaw was the Puerto Madero docks in Buenos Aires, Argentina (1887–98).

On 4 October 1884 Hawkshaw was appointed Lieutenant-Colonel in Command of the Engineer and Railway Staff Corps, an unpaid Royal Engineers volunteer unit which provides technical expertise to the British Army. He was granted the honorary rank of Colonel on 25 October 1902, and on 6 February 1903 received the Volunteer Officers' Decoration (VD), a reward for more than 20 years of volunteer military service. He continued as Lieutenant-Colonel in Command when the regiment became part of the Territorial Force on 1 April 1908. Hawkshaw also served as a Justice of the Peace.

In 1903 he was appointed a member of the Royal Commission to decide the British submission to the Louisiana Purchase Exposition of 1904.

Hawkshaw was married to Cicely Mary Wedgwood the daughter of Francis Wedgwood of the famous pottery firm. He died on 12 February 1921, Cicely had died on 6 September 1917.

Professional and academic associations
Preceded by Charles Hawksley	President of the Institution of Civil Engineers; November 1902 – November 1903	Succeeded by William Henry White
