= Bolívar Municipality, Yaracuy =

Bolívar Municipality Municipio Bolívar
- Municipality
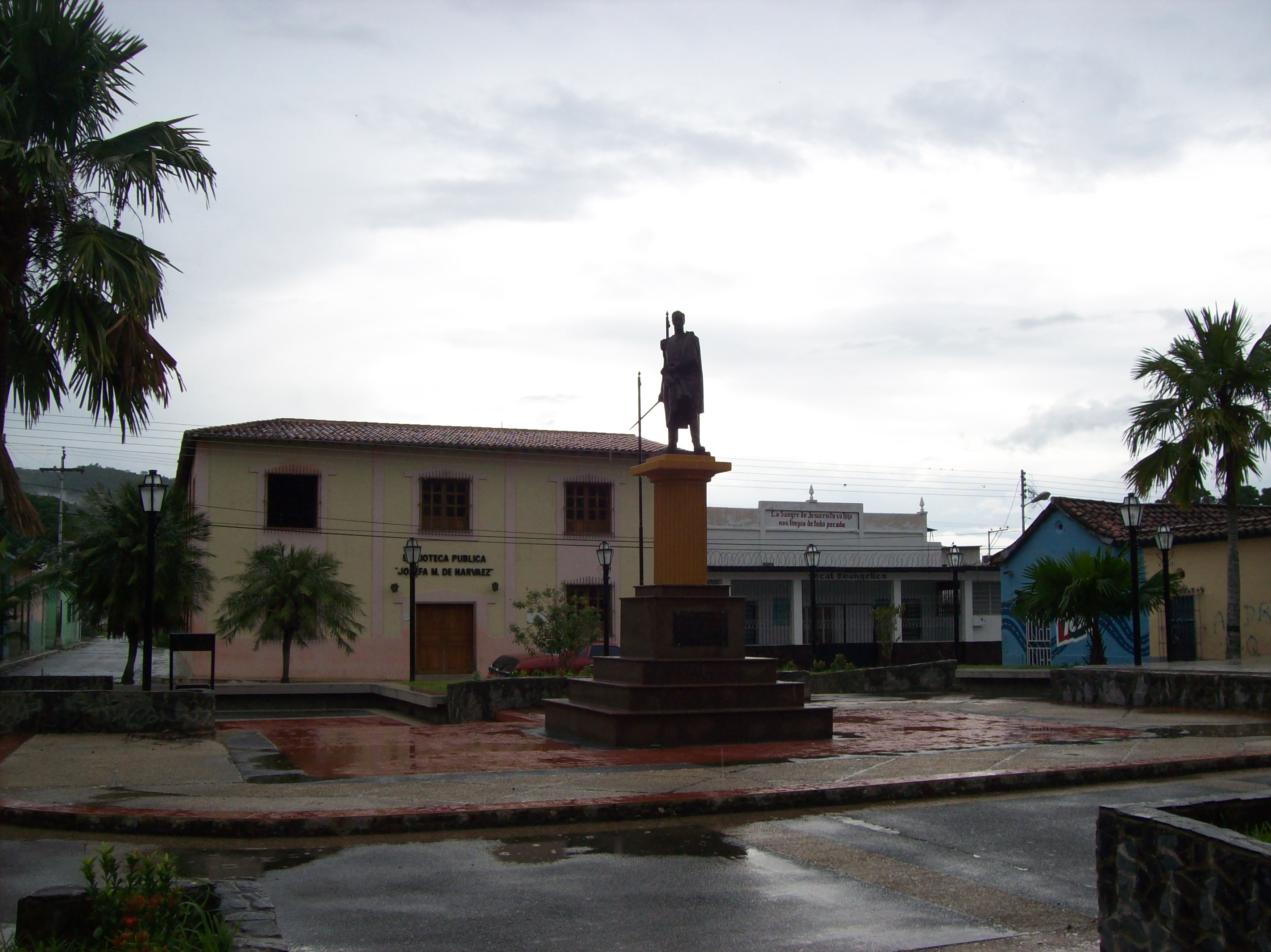

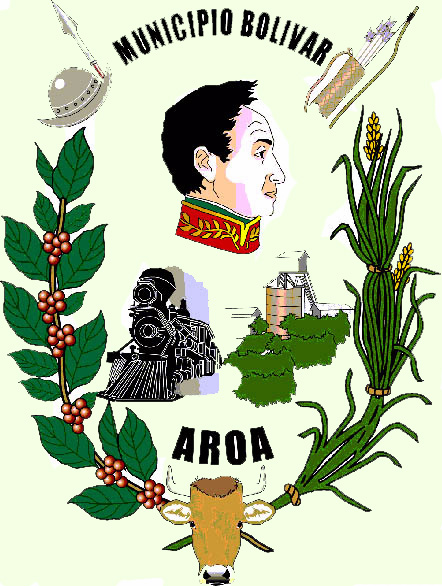
- Flag Coat of arms

- Location in Yaracuy

- Location in Venezuela
- Coordinates: 10°27′24″N 68°53′16″W
- Country: Venezuela
- State: Yaracuy

Government
  - Mayor: Sol Colmenárez (PSUV)

Area
  - Total: 840.4 km^{2} (324.5 sq mi)

Population (2001)
  - Total: 33,006
  - Density: 39.27/km^{2} (101.7/sq mi)
- Time zone: UTC−4 (VET)

Bolívar Municipality is one of the 14 municipalities of the state of Yaracuy, Venezuela. The municipality is located in northwestern Yaracuy, occupying an area of 1087 km² with a population of 33,006 inhabitants in 2011. The municipal seat is located in Aroa. The mayor is Sol Colmenárez of the PSUV party, since 2021.

== Name ==
The municipality is one of several in Venezuela named "Bolívar Municipality" in honour of Venezuelan independence hero Simón Bolívar.

== Demographics ==
Based on the 2011 Venezuelan census, The population of the Bolívar Municipality was 33,006 people, accounting for 5.14% of the total population of the state of Yaracuy. Less than half of the population (47.56%) resides in Arora, the municipal seat of the municipality.

By June 2019, official projections from the Venezuelan Statistics National Institute estimated the population of Bolívar as 37,905 people, representing an annual growth rate of 1.7% since 2011 and showing a population density of 34.87 inhabitants/km². However, these projections do not account for the impact of emigration linked to the country's recent economic and political circumstances.

The gender distribution of the population showed an even balance with 16,032 men (51.4%) and 15,153 women (48.6%). The age distribution showed that the largest segment of the population was aged 15 to 64, comprising 62.6% of the people. Younger people aged 0 to 14 made up 31.6% of the population, while those aged 65 and older accounted for the remaining 5.8%. The municipality is quite balanced in its rurality, with 52.6% of the inhabitants (16,389) living in rural areas compared to 47.4% (14,796) in urban centers.

Ethnically, the municipality identified as predominantly Mestizo (59.9%) and White people (33%). Minority groups included 6.1% Afro-Venezuelans and 0.9% belonging to other ethnic groups, with 26 individuals identifying as indigenous. The literacy rate was 88.5%, with 2,850 inhabitants of Bolívar not able to read or write.

== Government ==
The mayor of Bolívar Municipality is Sol Colmenárez of the United Socialist Party of Venezuela. She was first elected in November 2021. She was re-elected in July 2025, winning 93.91% of the votes.
