= Tucacas =

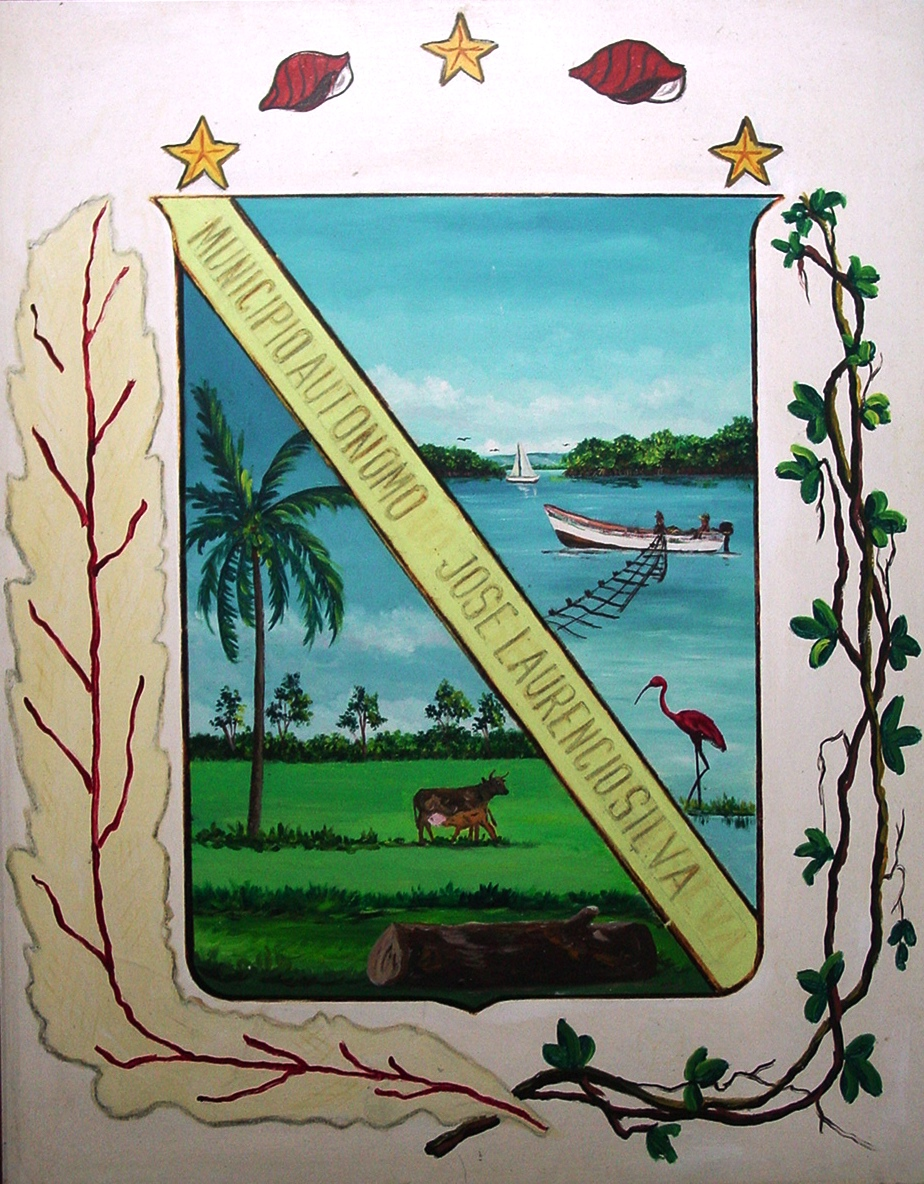
- Coat of arms

- Coordinates: 10°47′52″N 68°19′03″W

Tucacas is a northern coastal town of Venezuela. It is located in the state of Falcón.

== Geography ==
Tucacas is surrounded by two rivers making access from the interior of Venezuela difficult. It is at an elevation of 1m.

== History ==
In 1693 a large group of granas Jews originally from Leghorn left Curaçao for Tucacas. With the settlement of Jews there, the place became a lively commercial center. The Jews built houses, grew cattle, erected a fortress, and built a synagogue. They began to purchase cocoa beans and tobacco from the interior of Venezuela, and mule trains carrying cocoa from New Granada and Quito would arrive in Tucacas, sell their produce to the Jews, and purchase textiles and other European goods in return. The attempts by Spanish forces to attack the settlement failed, owing to the protection of Dutch naval units, the local Venezuelan population, and the defense by the Jews themselves. This Dutch enclave was under the command of Jorge Christian, Marquis of Tucacas, and Samuel Gradis Gabai, under the title Señor de Las Tucacas. Samuel was also president of the Hebrew congregation called "Santa Irmandad" (the Holy Brotherhood).

The Spanish provincial authorities collaborated with the Jews, since they saw them as an outlet for export and the suppliers of much-needed European goods, since the over-extended Spanish fleet could not meet the demands of all its American colonies.

At the end of 1717, the province of Venezuela became part of the viceroyalty of Nueva Granada which also included actual Colombia and Ecuador. The Viceroy Jorge de Villalonga, because of complaints from the Catholic clergy and from Spain, decided to eliminate Tucacas. Pedro Jose de Olivarriaga was nominated commissioner against the so-called Jewish "contraband trade." With special army units and 40 ships he attacked and captured the town in 1720. According to eyewitnesses the synagogue was destroyed, the Jews burned their own houses, and left for Curaçao.

=== Tucacas and Venezuelan independence ===
In the 19th century the port was used to export copper from the mines of Aroa. The mines belonged to the wealthy Bolívar family from colonial times until the 1830s. Simón Bolívar leased them to a British company in 1824. After Bolivar's death, his sisters who had inherited the mines, sold them to the British.

The ore was originally transported by river. However, a narrow gauge railway, which has been claimed to be the first railway in Venezuela, was built from Aroa to Tucacas. In 1924 the Bolivar Railway Company Limited, a British company which was part of a consortium which owned the copper mines merged with the Puerto Cabello and Valencia Railway.

== Local economy ==
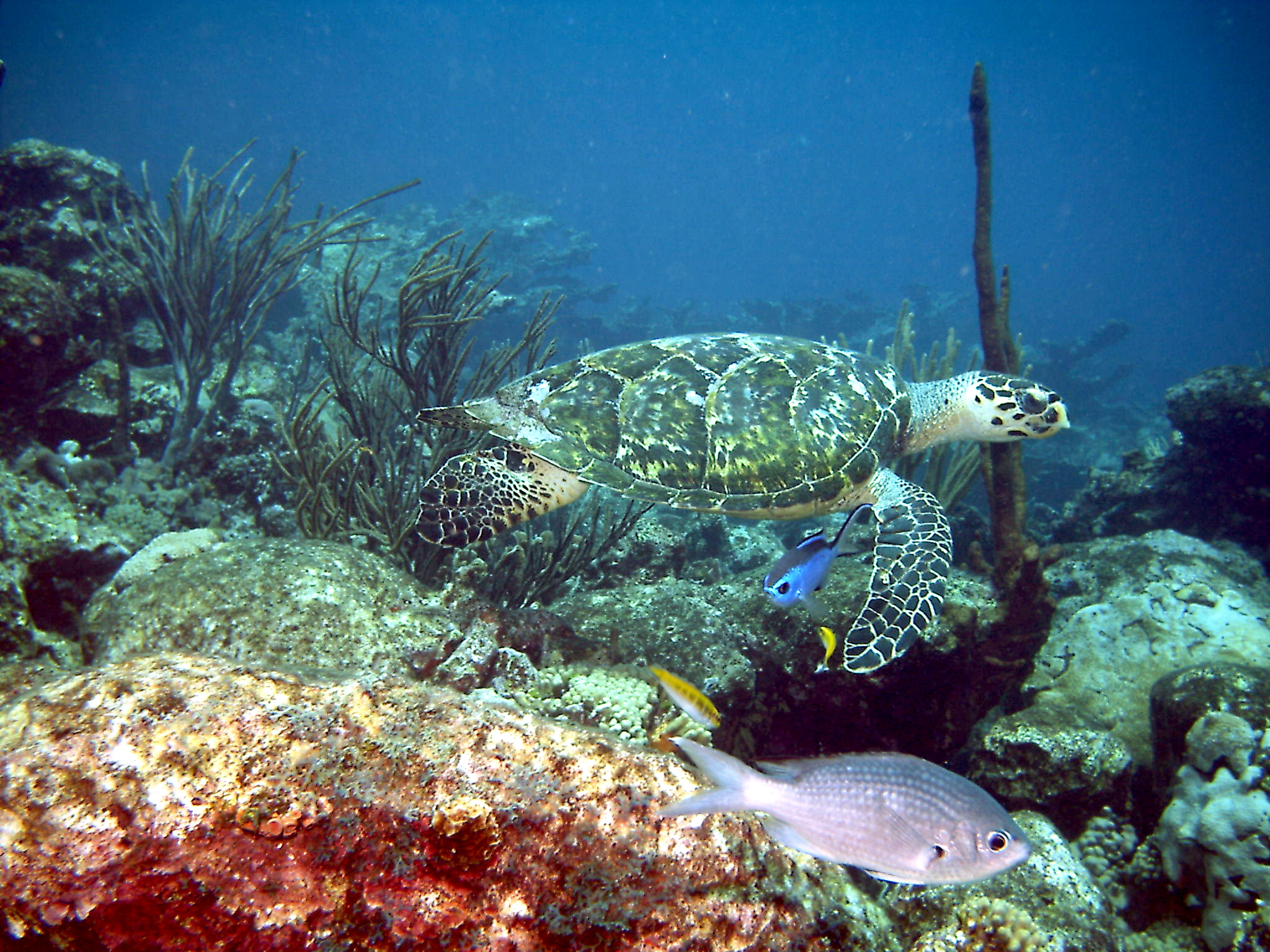
Turtle in Tucacas, Morrocoy National Park.

The economy is based mainly on tourism.

== Transport ==
It is mentioned as a station on the national railway network. However, there is not a train station in Tucacas and there is not railway service for passengers in this network. The railway is for transport of raw materials for the petrochemical industry. There are permanent bus services to and from Puerto Cabello, Valencia, Barquisimeto, Coro and to most important localities in the region. There is fuel, gas and diesel, available 24/7, repair shops, tow service and traffic police. There are boats for rent and taxi boats, marine fuel from 6 am to 6 pm, ship yards, boat parts stores and mayor repair services. Scooter and personal watercraft rentals, but no car rentals in town.

Tucacas is also mentioned as a destination at Conviasa's United States web-page.

== See also ==
- Parque Nacional Morrocoy
