= Yaracuy River =

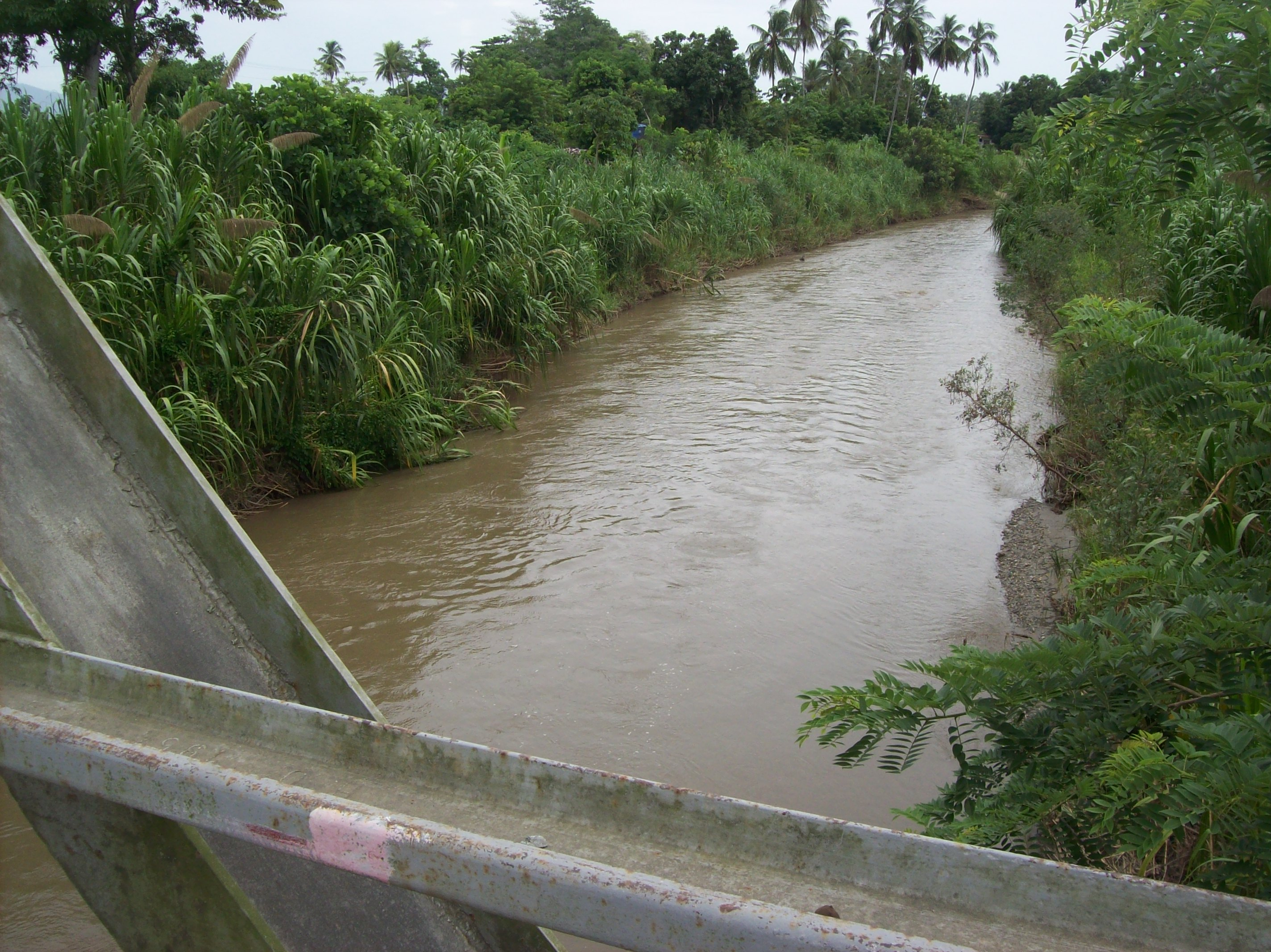

Location
- Country: Venezuela

The Yaracuy River is a river of Venezuela. It drains into the Caribbean Sea.

== See also ==
- List of rivers of Venezuela
