= Pa Lek-Pa Yai mango sticky rice =

Coordinates: 13°44′33.2″N 100°30′41.53″E

Pa Lek-Pa Yai mango sticky rice ข้าวเหนียวมะม่วงป้าเล็ก-ป้าใหญ่
- Interactive map of Pa Lek-Pa Yai mango sticky rice ข้าวเหนียวมะม่วงป้าเล็ก-ป้าใหญ่

Restaurant information
- Established: 1940
- Owners: Sermsi and Sirisak
- Previous owners: Pa Lek and Pa Yai
- Food type: Thai desserts
- Location: 164 Santiphap Road, Pom Prap Sattru Phai, Bangkok, Thailand, 10100

Pa Lek-Pa Yai mango sticky rice (Thai: ข้าวเหนียวมะม่วงป้าเล็ก-ป้าใหญ่, pronounced [kʰâːw.nǐaw maː.mûaŋ pâː.lék–pâː.jàj]) is a Thai dessert shop, known for its mango sticky rice and pandan custard sticky rice. It is located in the 22 July Circle area of Pom Prap Sattru Phai, between Hua Lamphong and Chinatown in Bangkok.

== History ==
The shop has a long history, having been established in 1940 by two pioneering sisters, Pa Lek (auntie Lek) and Pa Yai (auntie Yai) (from whom the shop takes its name). In those early days, there was no fixed shop like today; the sisters sold their desserts by roaming with a cart. Today, it is run by the third generation of the family, Sermsi (auntie Si) and Sirisak (uncle Sak).

== At present ==
Currently, Sirisak personally steams the sticky rice himself, not allowing any staff to assist, as every step must strictly follow the traditional recipe. He begins as early as 5 a.m., using only Khao Niew Kiew Ngu (lit. 'snake fang sticky rice') from Chiang Rai, harvested in the early season (December–January), to ensure the grains are of the highest quality and flavor. The process of steaming the sticky rice and preparing the coconut milk is carried out with great strictness and seriousness to avoid any mistakes. He does not even lose focus to engage in conversation. When finished, the rice grains are neatly aligned and glisten with the coconut milk coating. After steaming, the rice is never opened immediately; it must rest for 15 minutes before serving, otherwise it will harden.

The mangoes used are the Nam Dok Mai variety, a trusted staple sourced from Bang Khla, Chachoengsao, a region renowned for its high-quality mangoes with generous flesh, perfect for making mango sticky rice. The shop does not operate year-round; it opens only for about 5–6 months a year, during the mango season (roughly from early to mid-year, the Thai summer), when the fruit is at its peak in both yield and quality.

In addition, the shop also offers roasted golden mung beans and crispy dried fish as toppings to enjoy with the mango sticky rice.

== See more ==
- Kor Panich – another famous and old mango sticky rice shop in Bangkok
