= Kor Panich =

Coordinates: 13.7521°N 100.4984°E

Kor Panich ก.พานิช
- Interactive map of Kor Panich ก.พานิช

Restaurant information
- Established: 1932
- Owner: Anchalee Chiabchalard
- Food type: Thai desserts
- Location: 431-433 Tanao Road, San Chaopho Suea, Phra Nakhon, Bangkok, Thailand

Kor Panich (Thai: ก.พานิช) is a Thai sweet shop in Bangkok, Thailand. Founded in 1932 by Kab and Sarapee Chiabchalard in a shophouse on Tanao Road, the bakery is renowned for its sticky rice desserts, including mango sticky rice. The restaurant uses sticky rice from Chiang Rai, and Nam Dok Mai and Ok Rong mangoes, along with coconuts from Chumphon. Freshly grated coconut flesh is kneaded to produce coconut cream and coconut milk. Sugar, salt, and other ingredients are measured by weight and mixed by machine and weighed by scale. Independent vendors sell mangoes in front of the shop.

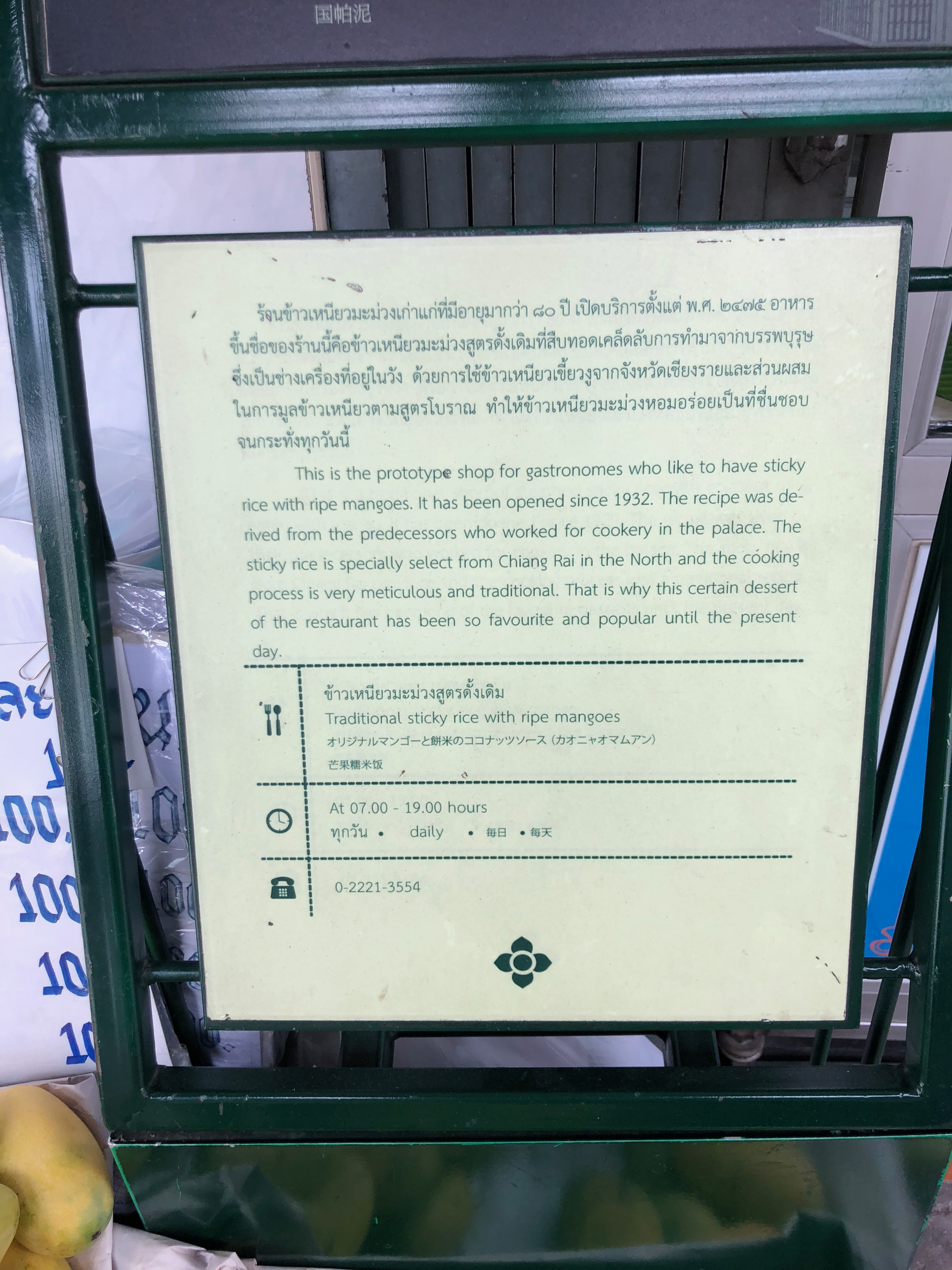
An information plaque for Kor Panich

== See more ==
- Pa Lek-Pa Yai mango sticky rice – another famous mango sticky rice shop in Bangkok
