= Manuel Monge Municipality =

Manuel Monge Municipality Municipio Manuel Monge
- Municipality
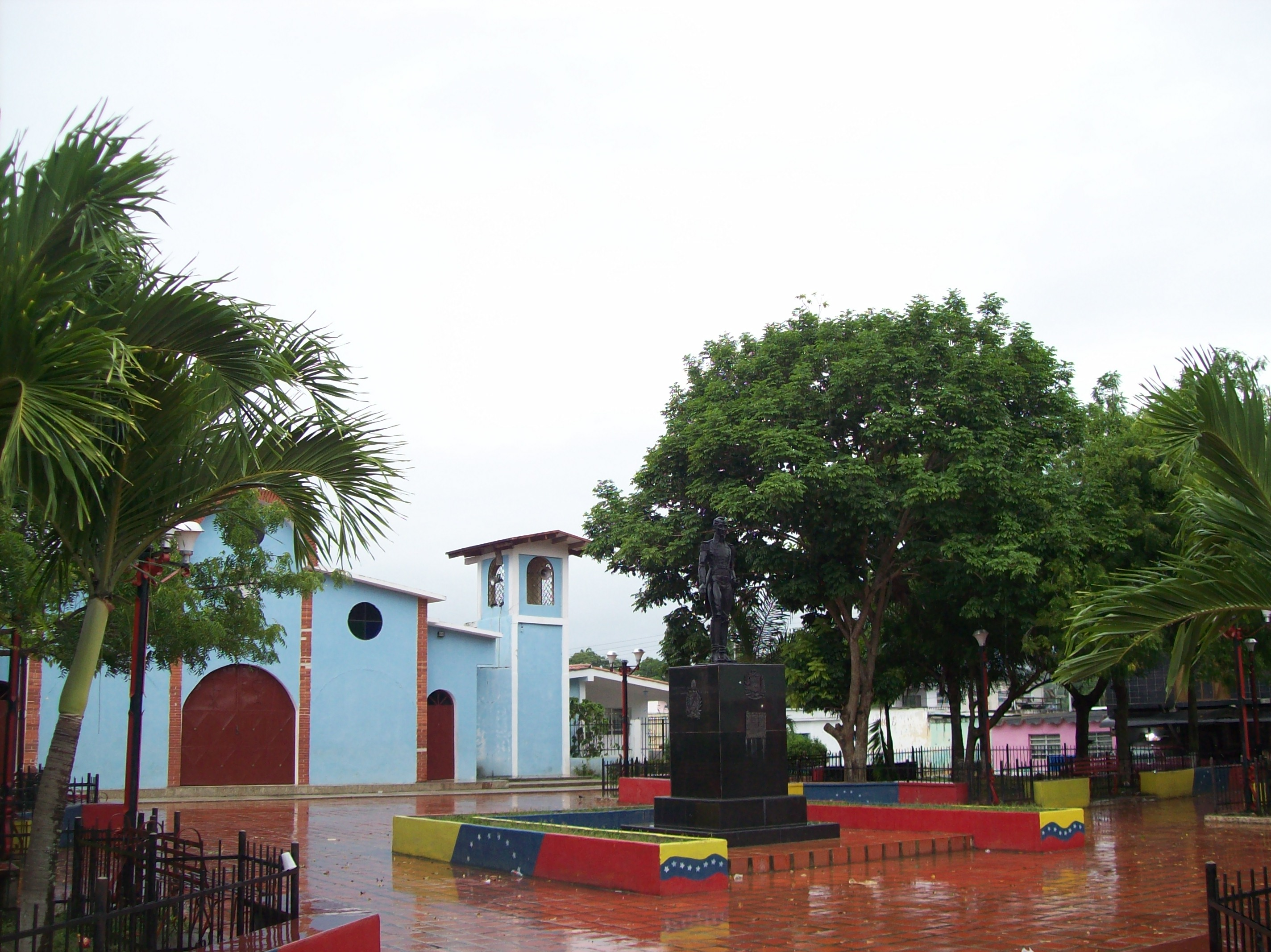

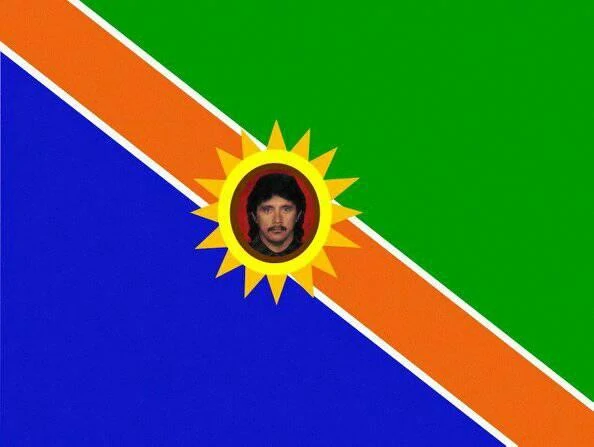
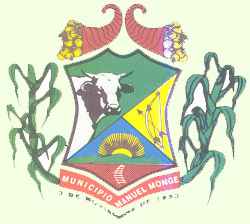
- Flag Coat of arms

- Location in Yaracuy

- Location in Venezuela
- Coordinates: 10°36′46″N 68°42′01″W
- Country: Venezuela
- State: Yaracuy

Area
  - Total: 542.6 km^{2} (209.5 sq mi)

Population (2011)
  - Total: 13,431
  - Density: 24.75/km^{2} (64.11/sq mi)
- Time zone: UTC−4 (VET)
- Website: Official website

Manuel Monge is one of the 14 municipalities of the state of Yaracuy, Venezuela. The municipality is located in northern Yaracuy, occupying an area of 474km² with a population of 13,431 inhabitants, as of the 2011 census. The municipal seat is located in Yumare. The municipality's economy relies heavily on agriculture and livestock. It is a notable regional producer of sugarcane, black beans, sweet potatoes, and low-acidity oranges, alongside a significant dual-purpose cattle sector where milk production is a major source of income.

== Economy ==
Like most municipalities in Yaracuy State, the economy of Manuel Monge is based on agriculture, being the fourth largest producer of sweet potatoes (13.7%) and oranges (11.9%), as well as sugarcane (3.8%) and black beans (0.9%). Particularly around the capital Yumare, the municipality is well known for its citrus production, which are uniquely characterised by low acidity levels.

As well as agriculture, the economy of Manuel Monge municipality relies on livestock with small and medium-scale farms dedicated to dual-purpose cattle farming, where milk production serves a primary source of income for the local rural population.

== Demographics ==
Based on the 2011 Venezuelan census, The population of the Manuel Monge Municipality was 13,431 people, accounting for 2.09% of the total population of the state of Yaracuy. Only a third of the population (32.09%) resides in Yumare, the municipal seat of the municipality.

By June 2019, official projections from the Venezuelan Statistics National Institute estimated the population of Manuel Monge as 15,417 people, representing an annual growth rate of 1.7% since 2011 and showing a population density of 32.53 inhabitants/km². However, these projections do not account for the impact of emigration linked to the country's recent economic and political circumstances.

The gender distribution of the population showed an even balance with 6,809 men (51.7%) and 6,371 women (48.3%). The age distribution showed that the largest segment of the population was aged 15 to 64, comprising 63% of the people. Younger people aged 0 to 14 made up 32.1% of the population, while those aged 65 and older accounted for the remaining 4.9%. The municipality is mostly rural, with 67.9% of the inhabitants (8,951) living in rural areas compared to 32.1% (4,229) in urban centers.

Ethnically, the municipality identified as predominantly Mestizo (59%) and White people (31.5%). Minority groups included 7.3% Afro-Venezuelans and 2.2% belonging to other ethnic groups, with 11 individuals identifying as indigenous. The literacy rate was 90%, with 1,044 inhabitants of Manuel Monge not able to read or write.
