= Farofa =

Toasted cassava flour

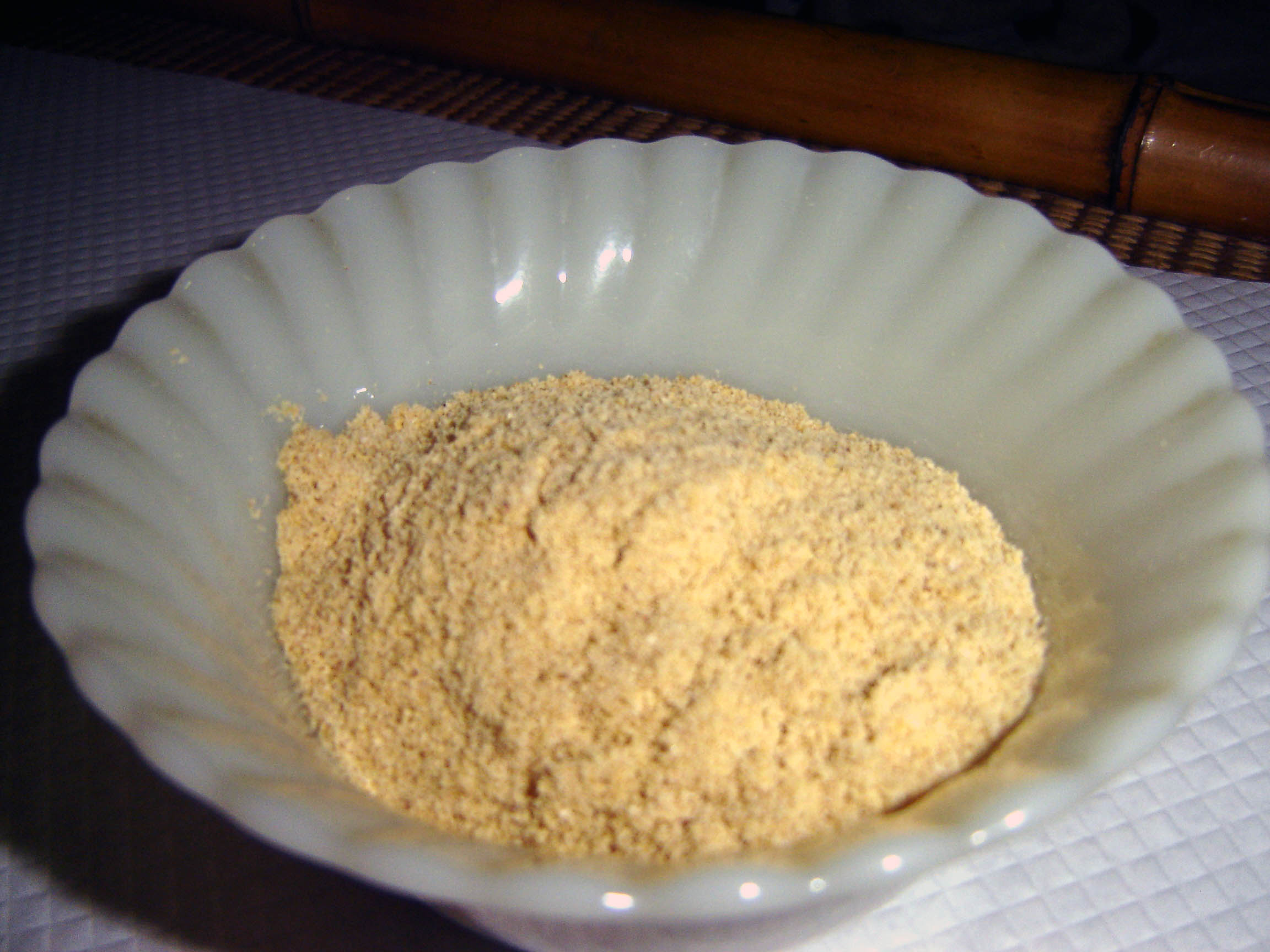
Farofa

Farofa (Brazilian Portuguese: [fa'ɾɔfɐ]) is toasted cassava meal. It is eaten mainly in Brazil. It can be found commercially produced and packaged but can also be prepared at home based on family recipes. Most recipes also contain some salt, smoked meat, and spices. The consistency of the mixture ranges from large grains the size of cracked bulgur wheat or couscous down to a table-salt-sized powder. Most farofas have a very smoky and slightly salty taste, by and large used to accentuate the taste of meat, particularly barbecued meat and hearty stews.

In Brazil, where farofa is particularly popular, typical recipes call for raw cassava flour to be toasted with abundant butter, vegetable oil or olive oil, salt, bacon, onions, garlic, sausage, or olives until golden brown. It is sometimes served as an accompaniment to Brazilian feijoada and Brazilian churrasco. In Brazil, farofa is also used in a stuffing for poultry and other dishes, usually containing raisins, nuts, and/or finely chopped sweet fruits like apples and bananas. In the state of Bahia, it is common for farofa to be prepared with dendê oil, giving it a stronger taste and a rich yellow coloring.

Farofa is served alongside the main course and can either be sprinkled on by individual diners to their taste before eating, or eaten as an accompaniment in its own right, as rice is often consumed. Besides cassava, corn meal is also used for farofa making.

In West Africa, a variant of cassava flour known as garri is used in various dishes.

== See also ==
- Garri
- List of Brazilian dishes
