= Black beans sticky rice =

Thai dessert

Black beans sticky rice (Thai: ข้าวเหนียวถั่วดำ, khao niew tua dum) is a Thai dessert made of glutinous rice, black beans and coconut milk. It is available throughout the year, unlike seasonal desserts such as mango sticky rice and durian sticky rice. It can have other ingredients added to create variations, such as mixing black and white Thai sticky rice. Black beans sticky rice is served warm. In Thailand, black beans sticky rice is a street food style dessert.

== Variations ==
Variations include pandan sticky rice, Thai black sticky rice and magenta plant sticky rice.
