= Yumare =

- Town
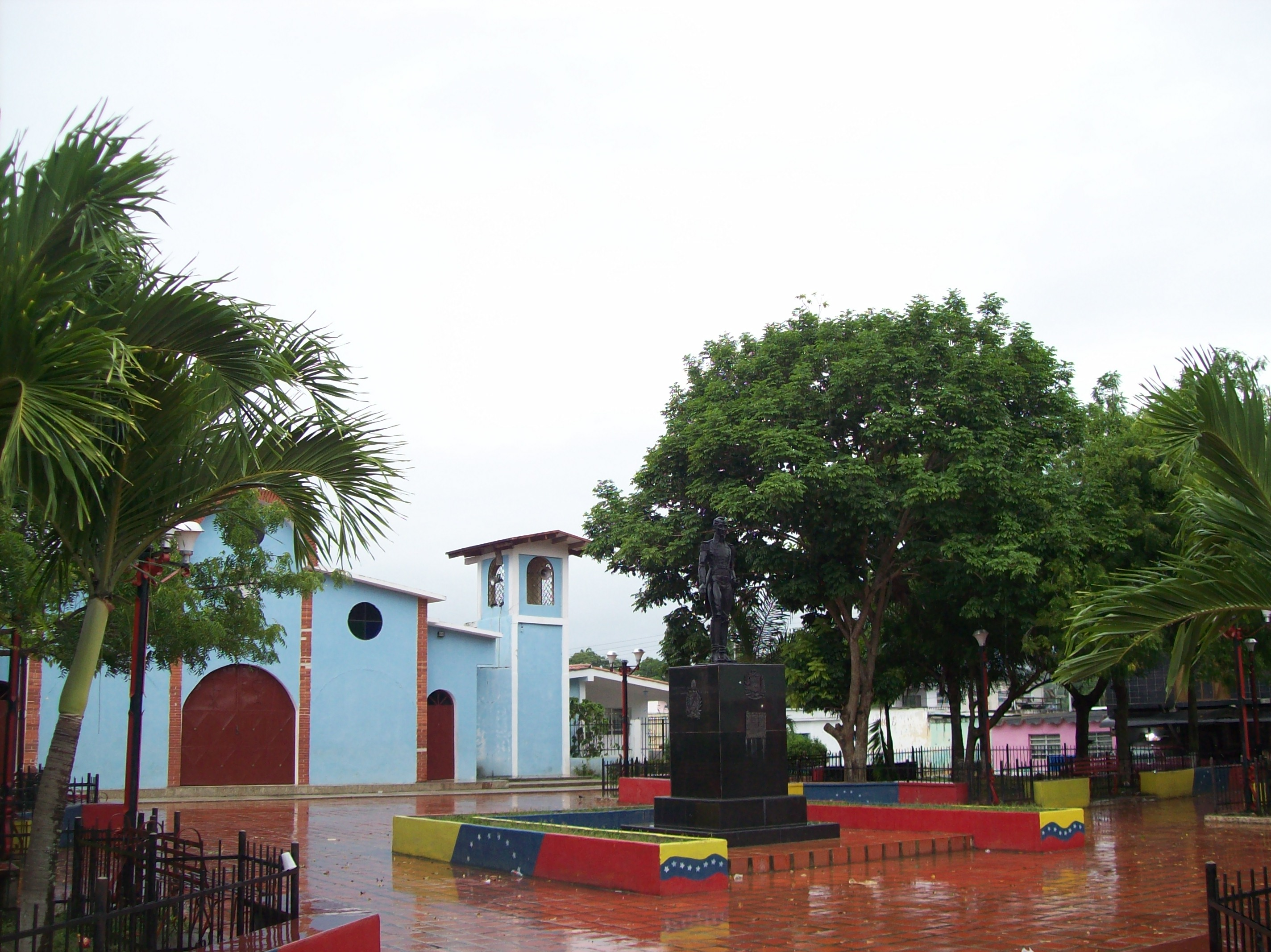
- Bolívar Plaza

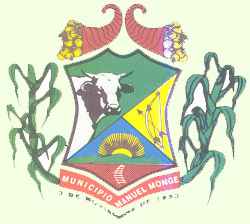
- Coat of arms

- Location in Venezuela
- Coordinates: 10°35′50″N 68°40′20″W
- Country: Venezuela
- State: Yaracuy
- Municipality: Manuel Monge

Government
  - Mayor: Jhoan Quero (PSUV)
- Elevation: 424 m (1,391 ft)

Population (2011)
  - Total: 4,229
- Time zone: UTC−4 (VET)
- Postal code(s): 3201

Yumare is a town and the seat of the Manuel Monge Municipality in the state of Yaracuy, Venezuela.
