= Feijoada (Brazilian dish) =

Traditional bean-based stew

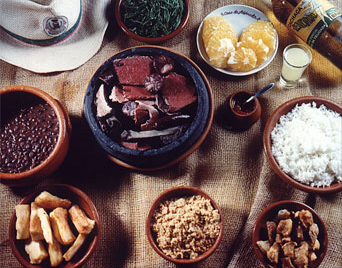
- Brazilian-style feijoada with a variety of side dishes: rice, fried cassava, pork rinds, oranges, caipirinha, etc.
- Alternative names: Brazilian feijoada, feijoada à brasileira
- Type: Stew
- Course: Main course
- Place of origin: Brazil
- Main ingredients: Black beans
- Ingredients generally used: Pork, beef
- Similar dishes: Feijoada

Feijoada or feijoada à brasileira (lit. Portuguese for "Brazilian-style feijoada") is a dish that consists of a stew of black beans with various types of pork and beef. It is served with farofa, white rice, sautéed collard green, and sliced oranges, among other sides. It is a popular dish, typical of Brazilian cuisine.

First documented in Recife, State of Pernambuco, feijoada has been described as a national dish of Brazil, especially of Pernambuco and Bahia, as other parts of Brazil have other regional dishes.

== History ==
Feijoada is a common name given to dishes from Portuguese-speaking countries. The Brazilian version of the delicacy is probably an adaptation of the Portuguese stew, which originated in the north of this country.

The first known mention of "feijoada à brasileira" was in Recife, Pernambuco, in 1827. In Brazil, the first mention of the dish dates back to the beginning of the 19th century in an advertisement published in no. 47 of the Diário de Pernambuco, in the city of Recife, on March 2, 1827, stating that at the Locanda da Águia d'Ouro, in das Cruzes Street, on Thursdays "excellent Brazilian-style feijoada would be served, all for a comfortable price." On August 7, 1833, also in Recife, the advertisement for the newly opened Hôtel Théatre, published in the Diário de Pernambuco, stated that "Feijoada à brasileira" would be served on Thursdays. On March 3, 1840, still in the Diário de Pernambuco, Father Carapuceiro published an article in which he said:

In families where true gastronomy is unknown, where they have gatherings, it is usual and common practice to convert the leftovers of the previous day's dinner into feijoada, which they call 'the burial of the bones' [...] Leftover turkey, roast suckling pigs, bacon and ham cutouts are thrown into a large pot or cauldron, as well as a good few pieces of dried meat, known as ceará, all mixed with the indispensable beans: everything is reduced to a grease!

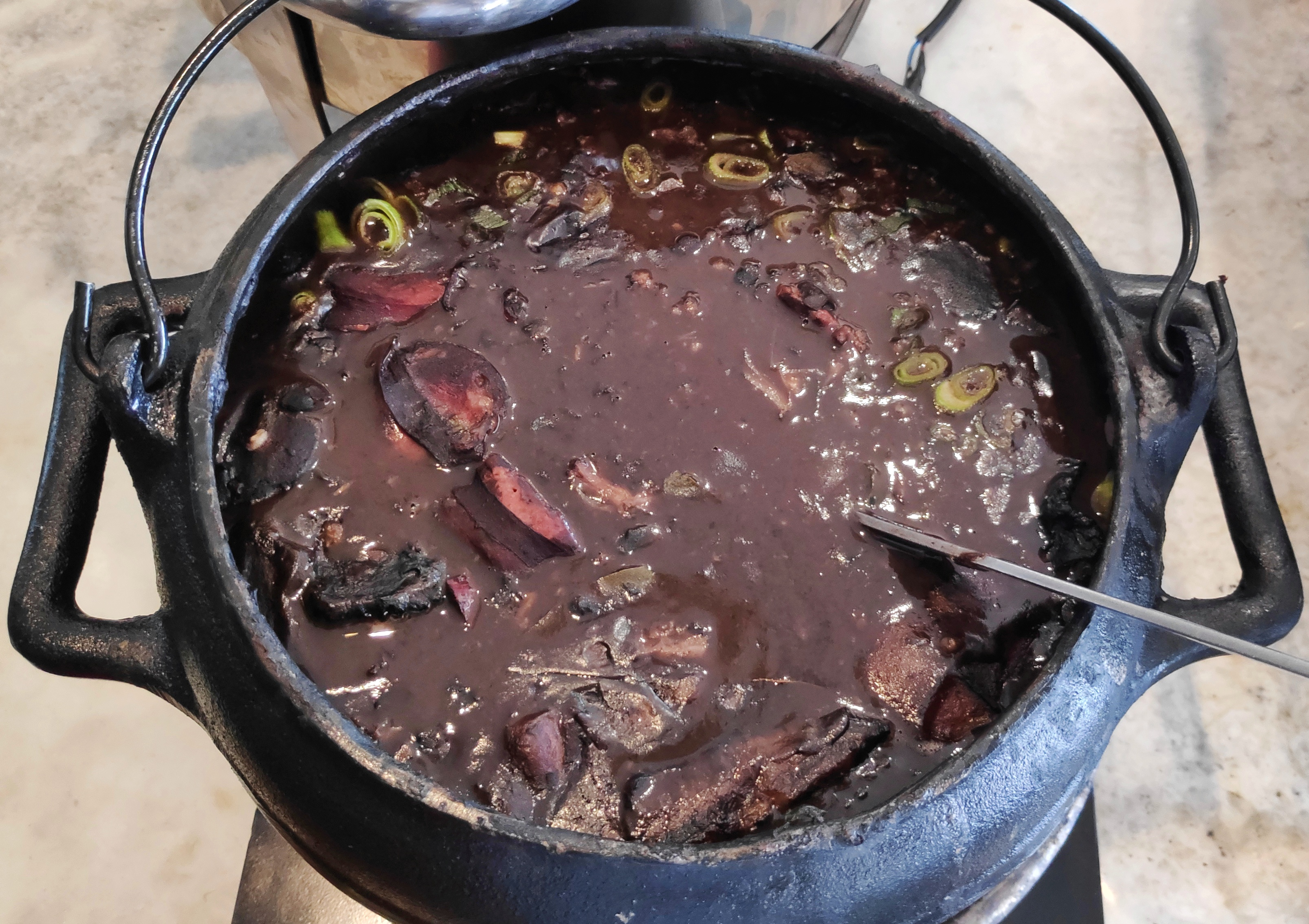
Brazilian-style feijoada stew

In 1848, the same Recife newspaper announced the sale of "bacon meat, suitable for feijoadas, at 80 réis a pound". On January 6, 1849, the Jornal do Commercio, from Rio de Janeiro, announced that the newly installed "Novo Café do Commércio" restaurant, next to the "Fama do Café com Leite" bar, would serve "A Bella Feijoada à Brazilleira" every Tuesday and Thursday, at the request of many customers.

On page two of the October 1st, 1860 edition of the Ceará newspaper D. Pedro II, in a pamphlet entitled "Amor d'um Escravo", Oscar Comettant describes feijoada as follows: "This food consists of salted meat, dried in the sun, black beans, small but very good, bacon, and to combine everything, a very coarse flour, which is made from the cassava root. From the mixture of these ingredients, a kind of dark porridge is formed, which may look unappealing but has a very pleasant taste. Feijoada (that is what that mixture is called) is the important dish of every modest dinner in Brazil: it is the meat pot [a reference to the French pot-au-feu] among us, and the puchero in Spain."

There is also a receipt for a purchase by the Imperial Household, dated April 30, 1889, from a butcher in the city of Petrópolis, in the state of Rio de Janeiro, which shows that green meat, veal, mutton, pork, sausage, blood sausage, liver, kidneys, tongue, brains, offal, and tripe sauces were consumed. This proves that it was not only slaves who ate these ingredients and that they were considered delicacies. In 1817, Jean-Baptiste Debret already reported on the regulation of the profession of "tripeiro" ("triper") in the city of Rio de Janeiro, who were street vendors who obtained these animal parts from cattle and pig slaughterhouses. Debret also reports that the brains went to hospitals and that the liver, heart, and guts (of cows, oxen, and pigs) were used to make angu (a type of porridge), which was commonly sold by female slaves or freedwomen in the city's squares and streets. This practice gave rise to what in Rio de Janeiro is known as "angu à baiana", mainly because it contains dendê oil (palm oil).

Black beans were domesticated by indigenous peoples in the Americas. Cheap and easy to cultivate, they became a staple among European settlers in Brazil. Both the upper classes and the poor ate black beans, but the upper classes particularly enjoyed them with an assortment of meat and vegetables, similar to feijoada. In contrast, the poor and enslaved usually ate a mixture of black beans and manioc flour. The most widespread popular legend about the origin of feijoada is that the masters gave their slaves the "leftovers" of the pigs when they were being slaughtered. Cooking these ingredients with beans and water gave rise to the recipe. This version, however, is not supported either by culinary tradition or by the slightest historical research. For example, pig's feet were part of Portuguese eating habits, judging by Camilo Castelo Branco's novel A Brasileira de Prazins, published in 1882, where it reads: "[...] he preferred the butter of his country, like veal, and the loin of the pig in Portuguese sausages, and the pig's foot in Portuguese tripe." According to historian Carlos Augusto Ditadi, in an article published in Gula magazine in May 1998, this myth is born of modern folklore, in a romanticized vision of the social and cultural relations of slavery in Brazil.

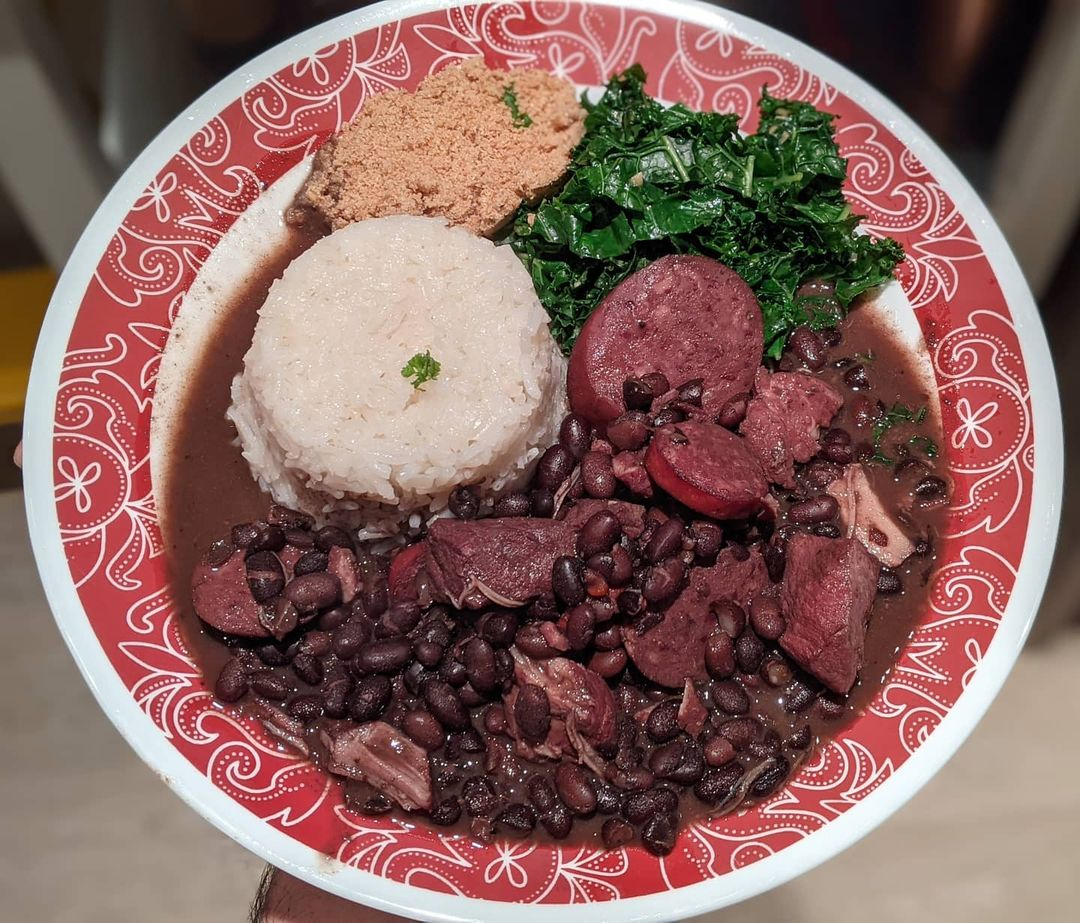
Typical feijoada dish accompanied by rice, kale and farofa

The feijoada completa ("complete feijoada"), as it is known, accompanied by rice, sliced oranges, sautéed kale and farofa, was very popular at the Rio de Janeiro restaurant G. Lobo, which was located at 135 General Câmara Street in downtown Rio de Janeiro. The establishment, founded at the end of the 19th century, but disappeared in 1905 with the widening of Uruguaiana Street.

In his books Baú de Ossos and Chão de Ferro, Pedro Nava describes G. Lobo's feijoada, praising the one prepared by Mestre Lobo. The contemporary recipe would have migrated from the kitchen of the G. Lobo's kitchen to the whole country. But Pedro Nava points out that it is (...) "rather the venerable evolution of Latin dishes".

(...) It can't be said to have been a spontaneous creation. Rather, it is the venerable evolution of Latin dishes such as the French cassoulet - a white bean ragù with goose, duck or mutton meat - which requires a stoneware pot - cassole - to be prepared."

The feijoada, in any case, became popular among all social strata in Brazil, always in a spirit of festivity and celebration, far from recalling scarcity. Those prepared at the end of the 19th century and beginning of the 20th century in Rio de Janeiro by the Bahian woman Tia Ciata were famous.

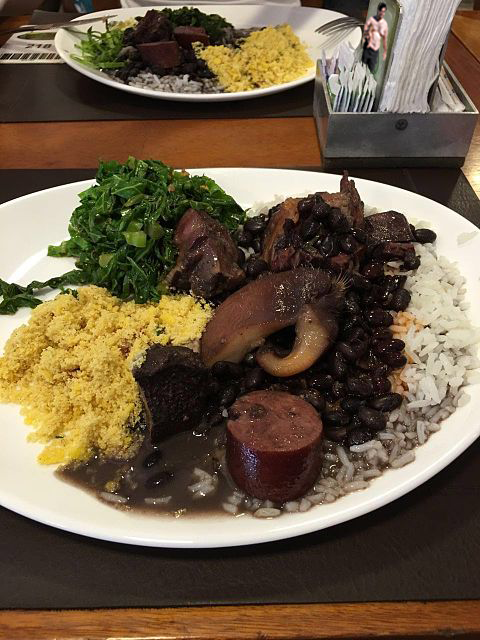
Typical feijoada accompanied by rice, sautéed kale and farofa

And earlier, the writer Joaquim José de França Júnior, in a text from 1867, fictitiously describes a picnic in the Cadeia Velha field, where a feijoada was served with "(...) loin, pig's head, tripe, mocotós, Rio Grande tongue, ham, dried meat, paio, bacon, sausages (...)", and, in 1878, he describes a feijoada in Paquetá: "The word feijoada, whose origin is lost in the night of the times of El-Rei Our Lord, does not always designate the same thing. In the common sense, feijoada is the appetizing and succulent delicacy of our ancestors, the bulwark of the poor man's table, the ephemeral whim of the rich man's banquet, the essentially national dish, like Martins Pena's theater, and the thrush of Gonçalves Dias' heartfelt poetry. In the figurative sense, the word refers to a patuscada, that is, 'a function among friends held in a remote or inconspicuous place."

The dish has spread throughout the country as the most representative recipe of Brazilian cuisine. Revised, expanded, and enriched, feijoada is no longer just a dish. Today, as Câmara Cascudo also noted, it is a complete meal.

The culinary historian Jessica B. Harris has compared Feijoada to American soul food. She has also linked the use of mixed meats, slow-cooking, and the accompaniment of collard greens to the traditions of enslaved African people.

== Preparation ==
The Brazilian version of feijoada (feijoada completa) is prepared with black beans, a variety of salted pork or beef products, such as pork trimmings (ears, tail, feet), bacon, smoked pork ribs, and at least two types of smoked sausage and jerked beef (loin and tongue). The final dish has the beans and meat pieces barely covered by a dark purplish-brown broth. The taste is strong, moderately salty but not spicy, dominated by black bean and meat stew flavors. It is customary to serve it with white rice and oranges, the latter to help with digestion, as well as couve, a side dish of stir-fried, chopped collard greens, and a crumbly topping called farofa, made of manioc flour.

== Regional variations ==
Many modern variants of the dish are based on feijoada recipes popularized in the Brazilian regions of Rio de Janeiro, São Paulo, Recife, and Salvador. The type of bean used in feijoada varies by region. While in the southeast, including Rio de Janeiro and Minas Gerais, feijoada is typically prepared with black beans, but in Bahia, Sergipe and Goiás, brown or red beans are more commonly used.

In Pernambuco, where it was first described and used, it was modified over time because Pernambucans prefer brown beans to black beans. This modified dish is called Feijoada pernambucana.

In most of Brazil, feijoada consists of only beans and meat, but in Bahia and Sergipe it is common to add vegetables including plantains, kale, potatoes, carrots, cabbage, and pumpkins, usually near the end of the cooking process, when they are cooked from beneath by the vapors of the stew.

== Cultural significance ==
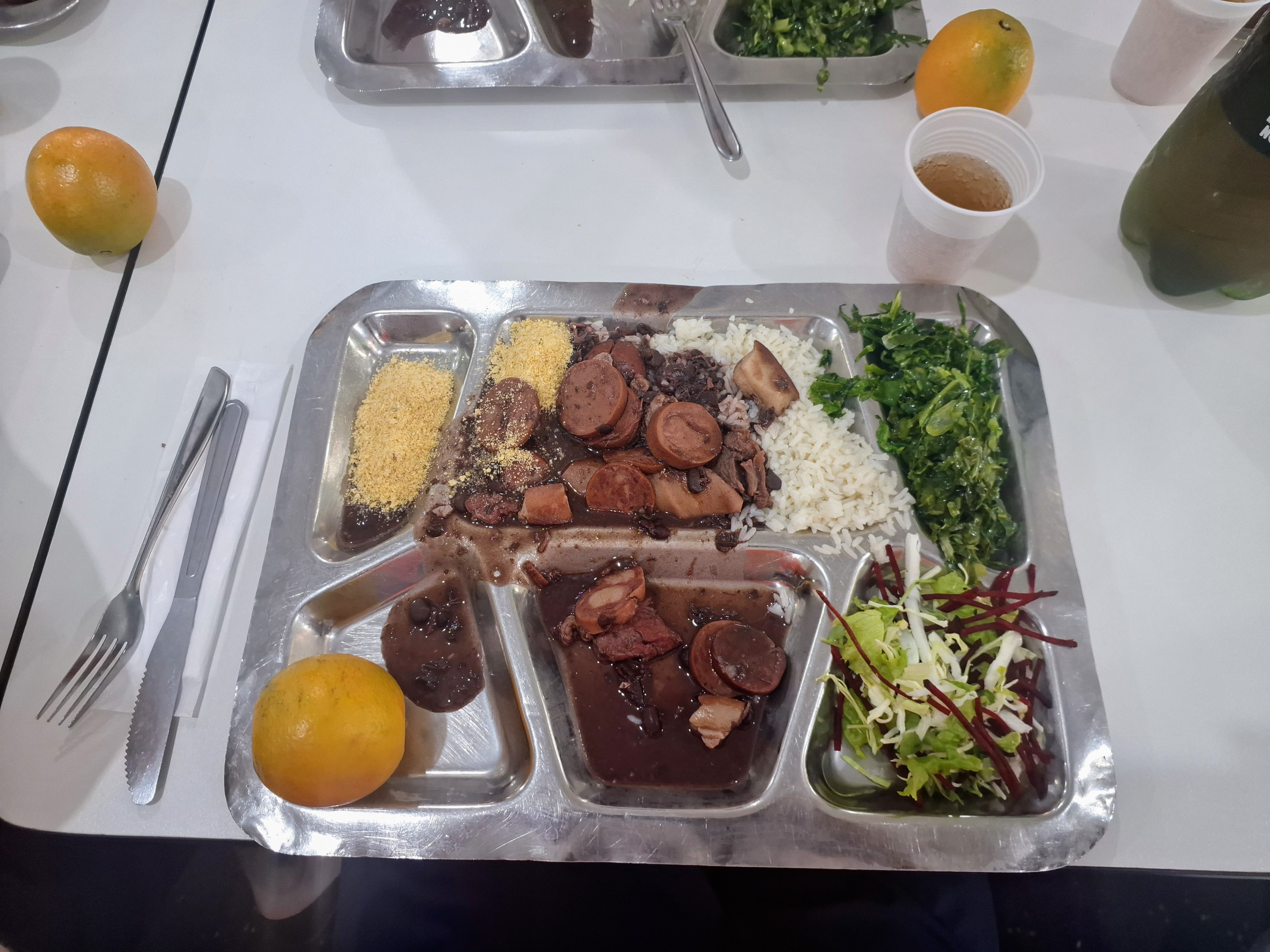
Brazilian feijoada served at the State University of Campinas

As a celebratory dish, feijoada is traditionally served on Saturday afternoons or Sunday lunch and intended to be a leisurely midday meal. It is meant to be enjoyed throughout the day and not eaten under rushed circumstances. The meal is usually eaten among extended family and paired with an event like watching a football match or other social event. Because of the dish's heavy ingredients and rich flavors, feijoada is viewed as Brazilian soul food. In the city of São Paulo, feijoada is a typical dish in working-class restaurants on Wednesdays and Saturdays, mainly in the commercial area. In Rio de Janeiro, restaurants traditionally serve it on Fridays. The dish is normally served with a choice among a selection of meats, e.g. pork, bacon, pig ears, pig feet, to fulfill the customer's needs. Other variations of feijoada also exist, such as low fat or vegetarian versions.

== In popular culture ==
Chico Buarque's 1978 album contains a song called "Feijoada Completa". The song's lyrics describe the ingredients, the method of preparation, and a typical way in which feijoada is consumed.

Feijoada was featured on the Netflix TV series Street Food volume 2, which focused on Latin American street foods.

== See also ==
- Feijoada
- Brazilian cuisine
- Rice and beans
- List of Brazilian dishes

== Bibliography ==
- Cascudo, Luís da Câmara (1983). História da Alimentação no Brasil (2ª ed.). Rio de Janeiro: Itatiaia.
- Ditadi, Carlos Augusto Silva - Cozinha Brasileira: Feijoada Completa- Revista Gula, n. 67, Editora Trad. São Paulo. 1998.
- El-Kareh, Almir Chaiban - A vitória da feijoada - Niterói : Editora da UFF, 2012. ISBN 978-85-228-0665-2.
- Elias, Rodrigo - Breve História da Feijoada - Revista Nossa História, ano 1, n. 4, Editora Vera Cruz, São Paulo. Fevereiro de 2004.
- Figueiredo, Guilherme - Comidas, Meu Santo - Rio de Janeiro, Editora Civilização Brasileira. 1964.
- França Júnior, Joaquim José da. Histórias e Paisagens do Brasil. Sd.
- França Júnior, Joaquim José da. Política e Costumes; Folhetins Esquecidos (1867-1868). Rio de Janeiro, Editora Civilização Brasileira, Coleção Vera Cruz, 6. 1957.
- Nava, Pedro, - Baú de Ossos, Memórias 1 - 4ª ed. Rio de Janeiro : Livraria José Olympio Editora. 1974.
- Nava, Pedro, - Chão de Ferro, Memórias 3 - 4ª ed. Rio de Janeiro : Livraria José Olympio Editora. 1976.
- Querino, Manoel Raymundo, A Arte Culinária na Bahia- Papelaria Brasileira, Bahia, 1928.
