= Mango sticky rice =

South and Southeast Asian dessert

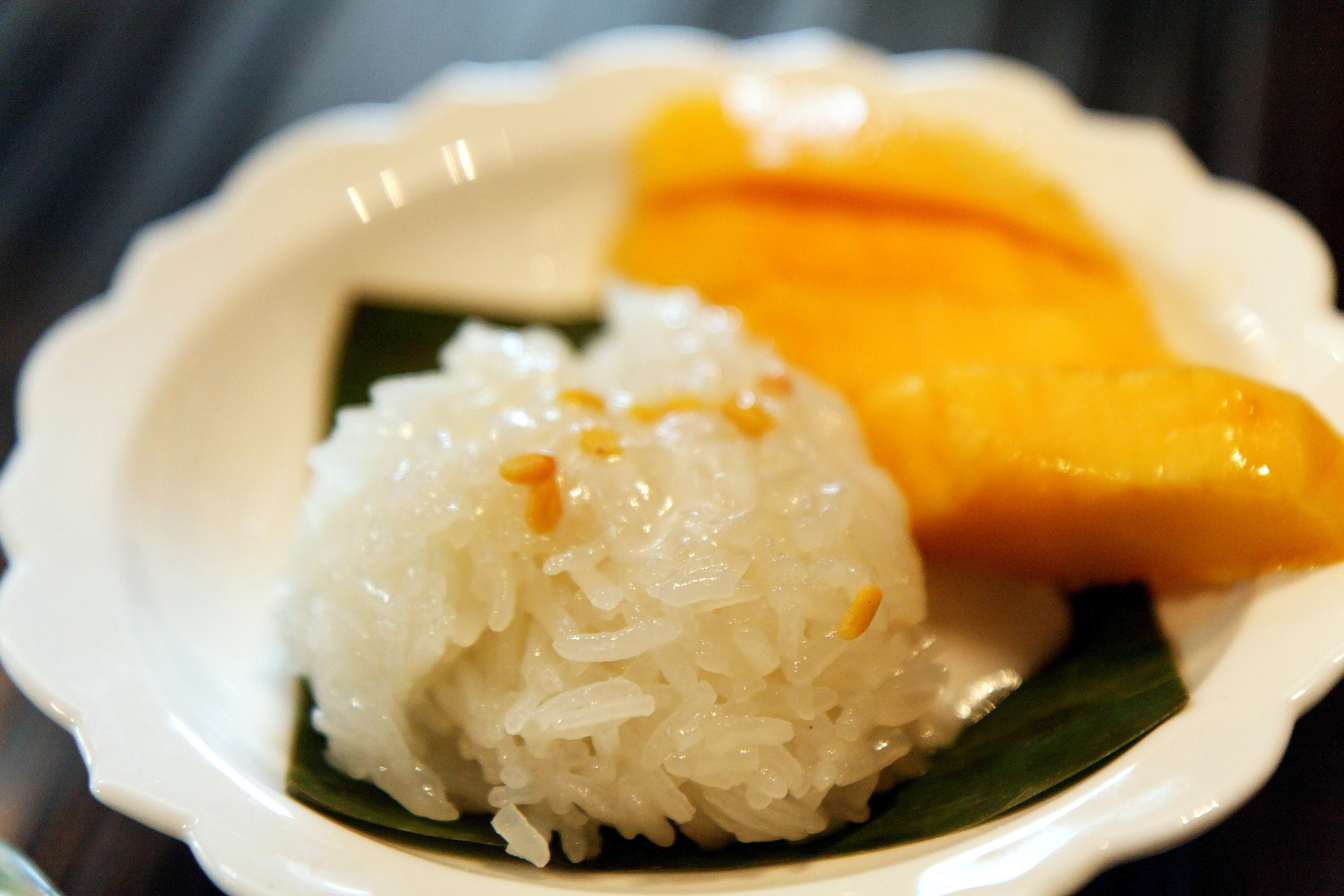
- Mango sticky rice
- Course: Dessert
- Region or state: Southeast Asia and South Asia
- Associated cuisine: Bangladeshi, Cambodian, Filipino, Lao, Malaysian, Northeast Indian, Thai.
- Main ingredients: Sticky rice, mango, coconut milk

Mango sticky rice is a traditional Southeast Asian and South Asian dessert made with glutinous rice, fresh mango and coconut milk.

== Preparation ==
Desserts involving sticky rice are sweetened with palm sugar or jaggery combined with coconut milk and coconut flakes, wrapped in banana leaf, then steamed or stuffed in bamboo and roasted on an open fire such as sticky rice in bamboo. The main ingredients needed are sticky rice (glutinous rice), canned or fresh coconut milk, salt, palm sugar and mangoes.

To prepare the dish, the rice is soaked in water and then cooked by steaming or the use of a rice cooker. Meanwhile, the coconut milk is mixed with salt and sugar then heated without boiling. After the rice is finished cooking, the coconut milk mixture and the rice are mixed together evenly and allowed to sit to allow the milk to absorb into the rice. The mangoes are peeled and sliced. To serve the dish, the rice is scooped onto a plate, a few mango slices are placed on top or to the side, and the remaining coconut milk is drizzled on top. Sometimes, the sticky rice is topped with crispy yellow mung beans.

Typically, yellow mango is used which has a sweeter taste than green mango. Traditionally, the Nam Dok Mai (flower nectar mango) and ok-rong varieties of mango are used. Glutinous sticky rice, which is sweeter than normal sticky rice, is used for the best texture.

== Variations ==
There are variations to the classic mango sticky rice, such as substituting white sticky rice with black sticky rice, imparting a purple color.

=== In Cambodia ===
In Cambodia, mango sticky rice (Khmer: បាយដំណើបស្វាយទុំ bai damnoep svaytoum) is eaten during mango season. It is prepared by soaking sticky rice in room temperature water for at least one hour, then washing, draining and steaming the rice for 20 minutes. Once the rice has almost cooked, a mixture of coconut milk, sugar and salt is gradually mixed into the rice before cooking the mixture at low heat for another 5 to 10 minutes. The dish is served with freshly squeezed coconut milk on top and bite-sized cubes of peeled mango on the side.

=== In Laos ===
Mango sticky rice is a common dessert of the Lao people of the Greater Mekong Subregion where glutinous rice has been cultivated throughout history. Sticky or glutinous rice is a Laotian national dish connected to their culture and religious traditions. In mango-ripening season, sticky rice garnished with sweetened coconut milk and dry roasted sesame seeds is served with ripe mango pieces. Sticky rice may be served plain with only mango and no toppings.

=== In Malaysia ===
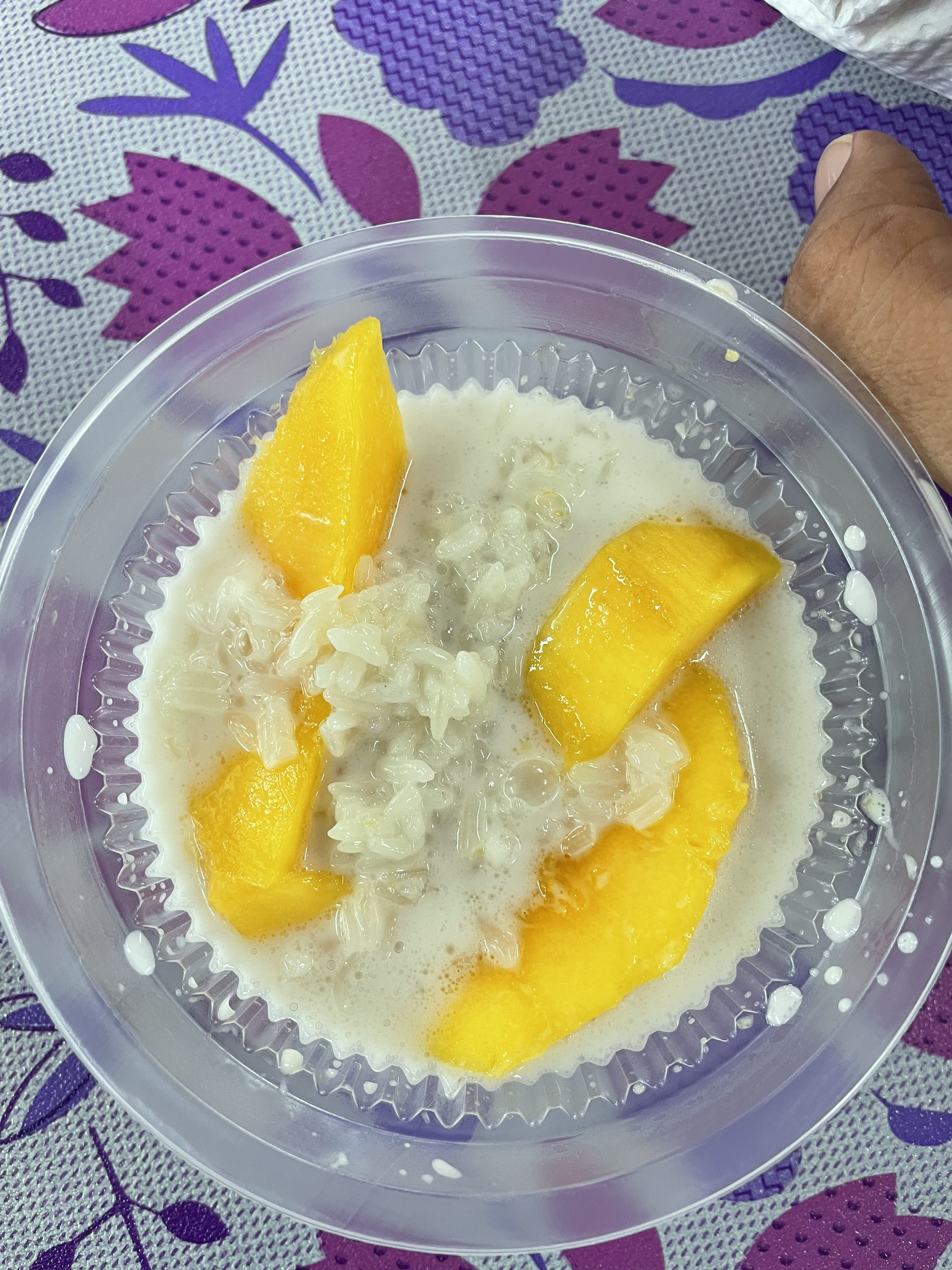
Mango sticky rice in Malaysia

Mango sticky rice called Pulut Mangga in Malay is popular in Malaysia and mainly comes from Kelantan region due to its shared culture with Thai Malays in the Southern Thailand.

=== In the Philippines ===
A sticky rice snack cooked in coconut milk and sometimes ginger, called puto maya, is a favorite among the Visayan people. It is served with sweet ripe mangoes (if in season) and is paired with sikwate, a Filipino hot chocolate which may be poured over the rice. In Cagayan de Oro, a violet variety of sticky rice is used and it may be shaped into triangles and wrapped in banana leaves.

=== In Thailand ===
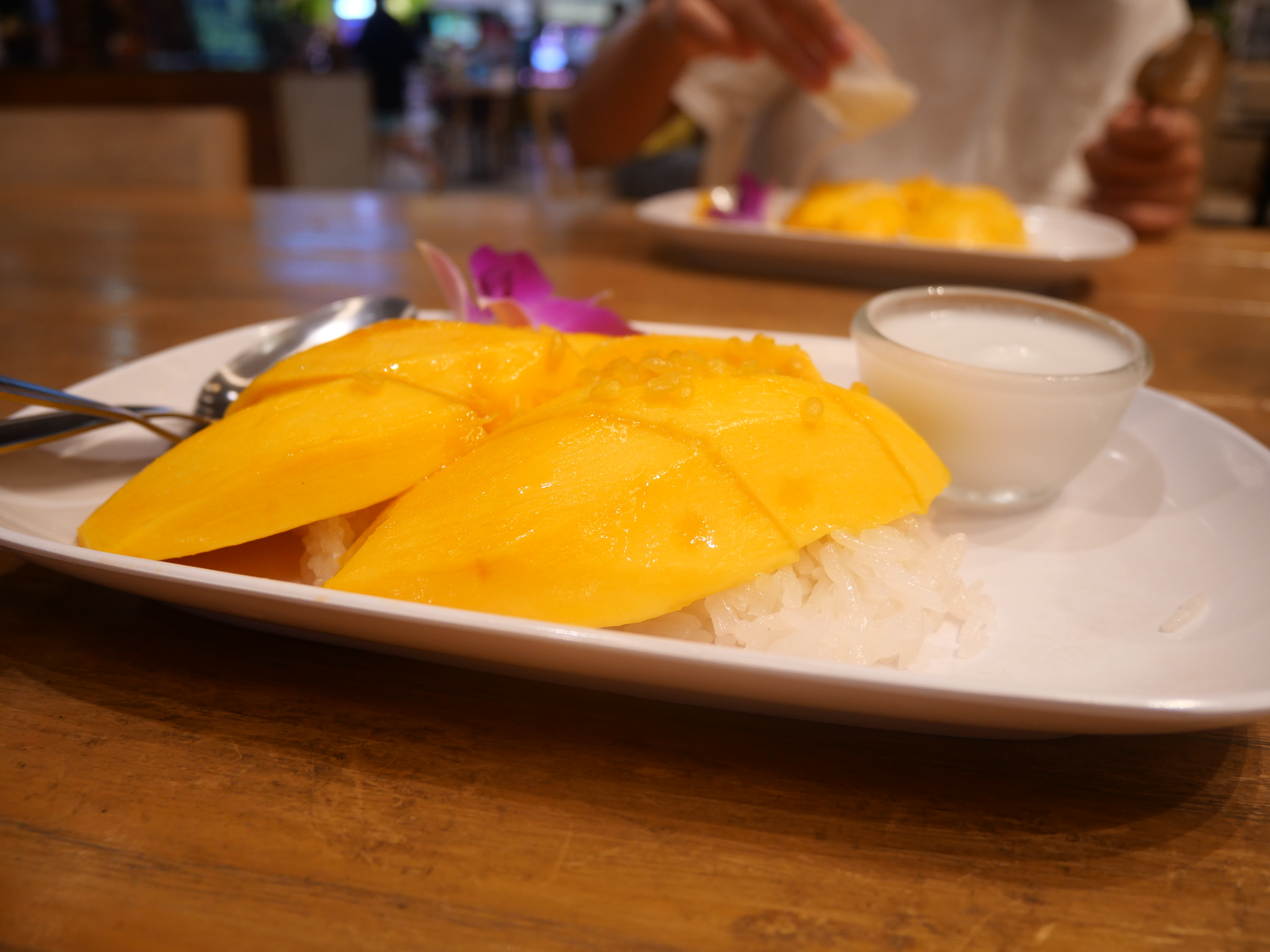
Mango sticky rice served in the food court of Central Pattaya in Pattaya, Thailand

Khao niao mamuang (Thai: ข้าวเหนียวมะม่วง), which translates to mango sticky rice, is a traditional Thai dessert that typically consists of sticky rice cooked with coconut milk and served with fresh sliced mangoes on top. Optional toppings for mango sticky rice include roasted mung beans and toasted sesame seeds, which can be sprinkled on top for added crunch and flavor. In Central Thailand, coconut milk is a primary ingredient due to the abundance of coconut trees in these regions. However, in the colder Northern region, where it can be challenging to obtain fresh coconuts, the use of coconut milk is less common. Khao niao moon, a glutinous rice mixed with coconut milk, is commonly used in Central Thailand for desserts like mango sticky rice, while in Northern and Northeastern Thailand, plain sticky rice is more commonly used as a staple food and eaten with one's hands, without the addition of coconut.

The exact origin of mango sticky rice in Thailand it is believed to date back to the late Ayutthaya period. A written record from that era describes a fondness for sweet dishes, including a mention of ok rong mango, which is a cultivar native to Thailand. During King Chulalongkorn's reign, khao niao moon was consumed alongside ripe mango. Although mango sticky rice is said to have originated in Thailand, it has spread to many other Southeast and South Asian countries.

Mango sticky rice is a common street food in Thailand and is popular among foreign tourists in Thailand. It is usually eaten during the peak mango season of April and May. Common sweet mango cultivars, such as Nam Dok Mai or Ok rong, are combined with glutinous rice sweetened with coconut milk, and served warm.

== See also ==
- Black beans sticky rice
