= Black turtle bean =

Small, shiny variety of the common bean

Black turtle bean, boiled, with salt
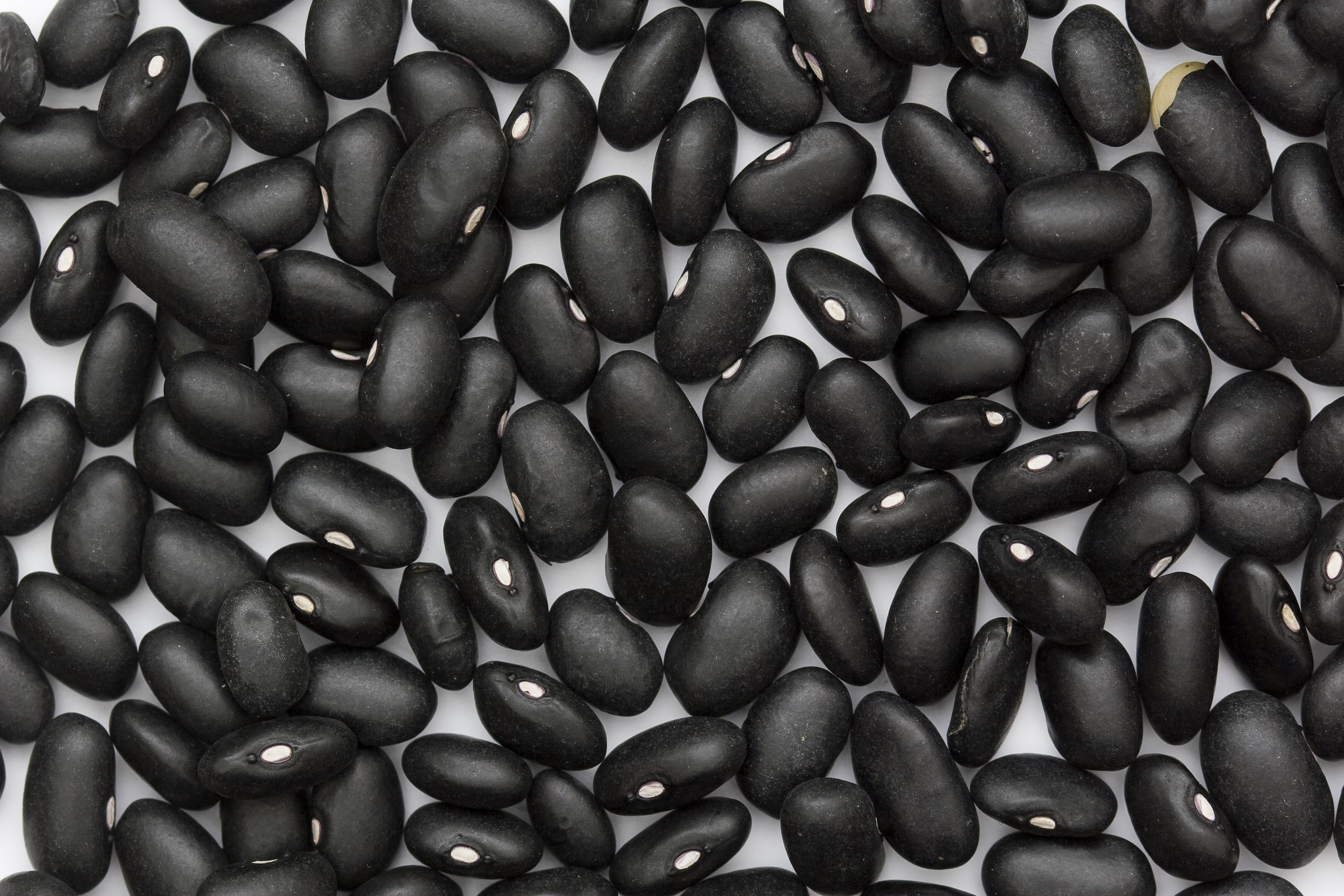

Nutritional value per 100 g (3.5 oz)
- Energy: 552 kJ (132 kcal)
- Carbohydrates: 23.71
- Sugars: 0.32
- Dietary fiber: 8.7
- Fat: 0.54
- Saturated: 0.139
- Trans: 0
- Monounsaturated: 0.047
- Polyunsaturated: 0.231
- Protein: 8.86
Vitamins and minerals
Vitamins	Quantity %DV^{†}
Vitamin A equiv.	0% 0 μg
Vitamin A	6 IU
Thiamine (B1)	20% 0.244 mg
Riboflavin (B2)	5% 0.059 mg
Niacin (B3)	3% 0.505 mg
Vitamin B6	4% 0.069 mg
Folate (B9)	37% 149 μg
Vitamin B12	0% 0 μg
Vitamin C	0% 0 mg
Vitamin D	0% 0 μg
Vitamin E	6% 0.87 mg
Vitamin K	3% 3.3 μg
Minerals	Quantity %DV^{†}
Calcium	2% 27 mg
Iron	12% 2.10 mg
Magnesium	17% 70 mg
Phosphorus	11% 140 mg
Potassium	12% 355 mg
Sodium	10% 237 mg
Zinc	10% 1.12 mg
- Other constituents: Quantity
- Water: 65.74 g
- Link to FoodData Central, USDA database
- ^{†}Percentages estimated using US recommendations for adults, except for potassium, which is estimated based on expert recommendation from the National Academies.

The black turtle bean is a small, shiny variety of the common bean (Phaseolus vulgaris) used in many cuisines. Like all varieties of the common bean, it is native to the Americas, but has been introduced around the world.

The black turtle bean is simply called the black bean (frijoles negros, zaragoza, judía negra, poroto negro, caraota negra, or habichuela negra in Spanish; and feijão preto in Portuguese), although this terminology can cause confusion with at least three other types of black beans.

The black turtle bean is the only type of turtle bean. It is called turtle because of its hard outer "shell". It is not the same bean as used for douchi, the Chinese dish made with black hulled soybeans.

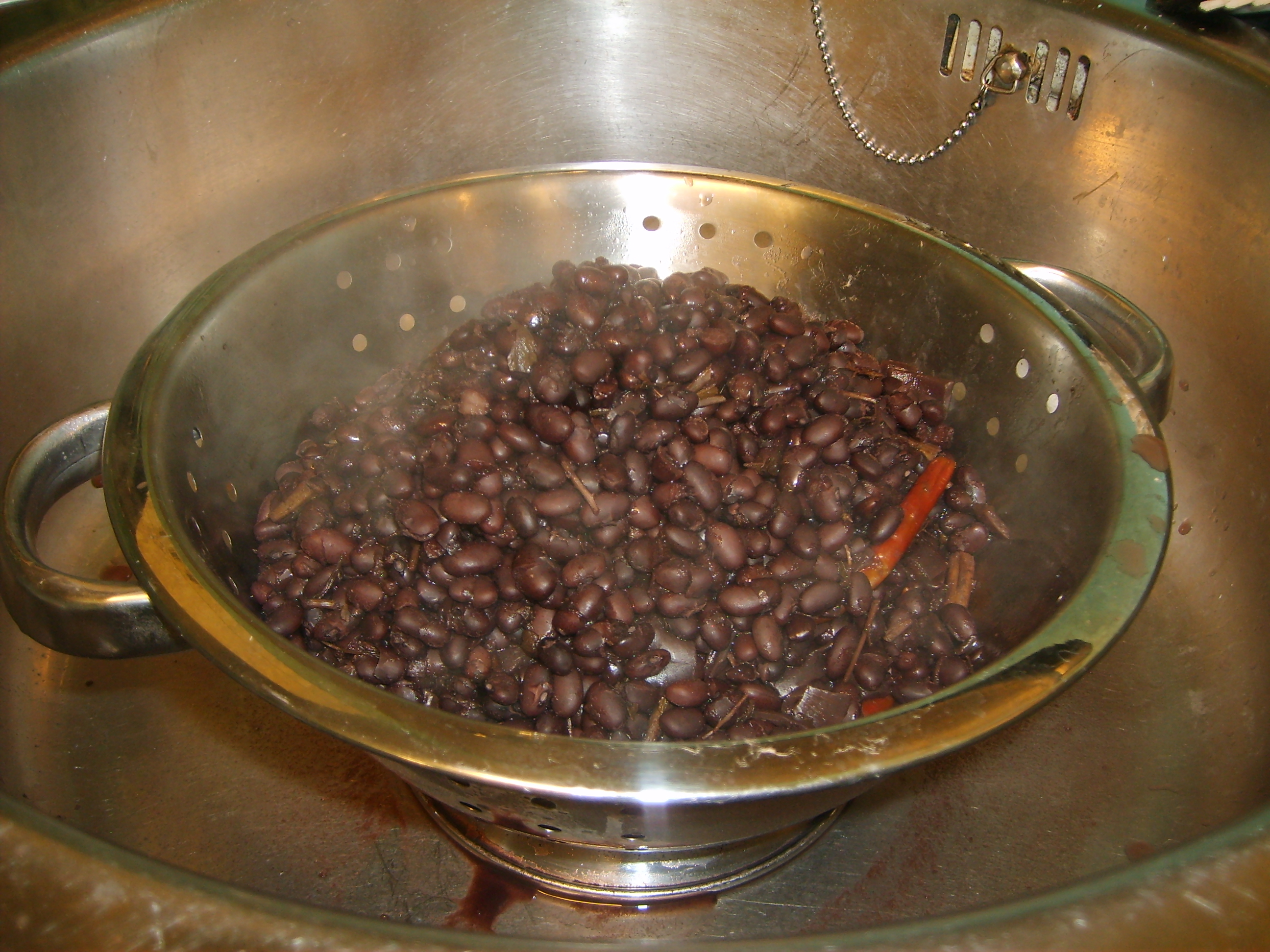
Cooked black beans

== Nutrition ==
Once boiled and salted to prepare for eating, black turtle beans are 66% water, 24% carbohydrates, 9% protein, and 0.5% fat (table). In a reference amount of 100 g (3.5 oz), boiled black turtle beans supply 132 calories of food energy, and are a rich source (20% or more the Daily Value, DV) of thiamine and folate, with several dietary minerals in moderate content (table).

== Use in cuisines ==
The black bean has a dense, meaty texture used in vegetarian dishes, such as frijoles negros and the Mexican-American black bean burrito. It is a commonly consumed in various regions of Brazil, and is used in the national dish, feijoada. It is also a main ingredient of Moros y Cristianos in Cuba, is a required ingredient in the typical gallo pinto of Costa Rica and Nicaragua, is a fundamental part of Pabellón criollo in Venezuela, and is served in almost all of Latin America, as well as many Hispanic enclaves in the United States. In the Dominican Republic cuisine, it is also used for a variation of the Moros y Cristianos simply called Moro de habichuelas negras. The black turtle bean is a soup ingredient. In Cuba, black bean soup is a traditional dish, usually served with white rice. Black beans sticky rice is a Thai dessert.

The bean was first widely grown in the present-day United States after the Mexican–American War (1846–1848). However, initially the variety was primarily grown as a snap pea (for the edible seed pod).

It is also common to keep the boiled water of these beans (which acquires a black coloring) and consume it as a soup with other ingredients for seasoning (known as sopa negra, black soup, or as sopa de frijoles, bean soup), as a broth (caldo de frijol, bean broth) or to season or color other dishes (aforementioned gallo pinto, for example).

== Anthocyanins ==
Black turtle beans contain anthocyanins in their dried seed coats, giving the beans their dark color.

== Gallery ==
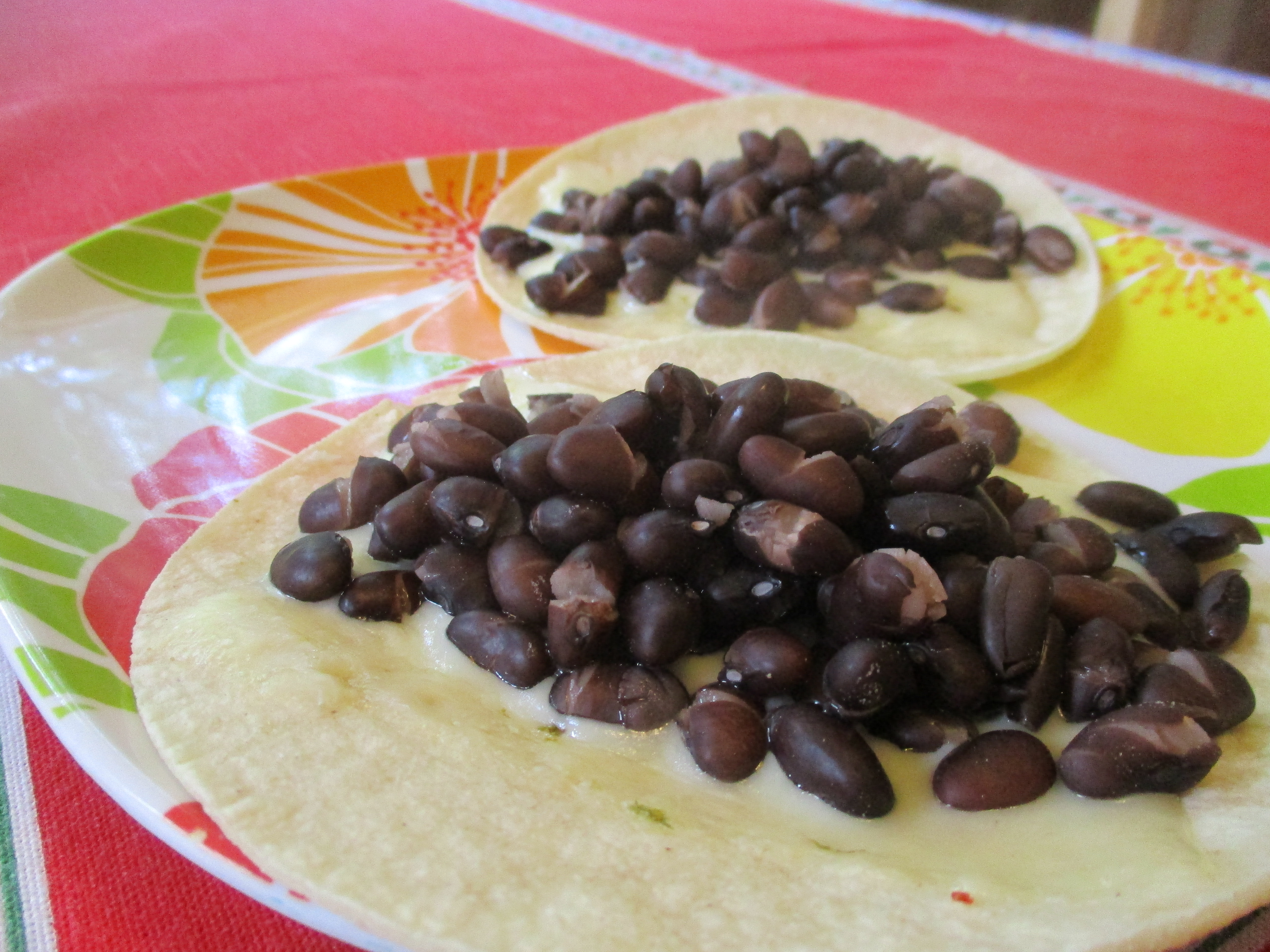
Cooked whole black turtle beans on tortillas

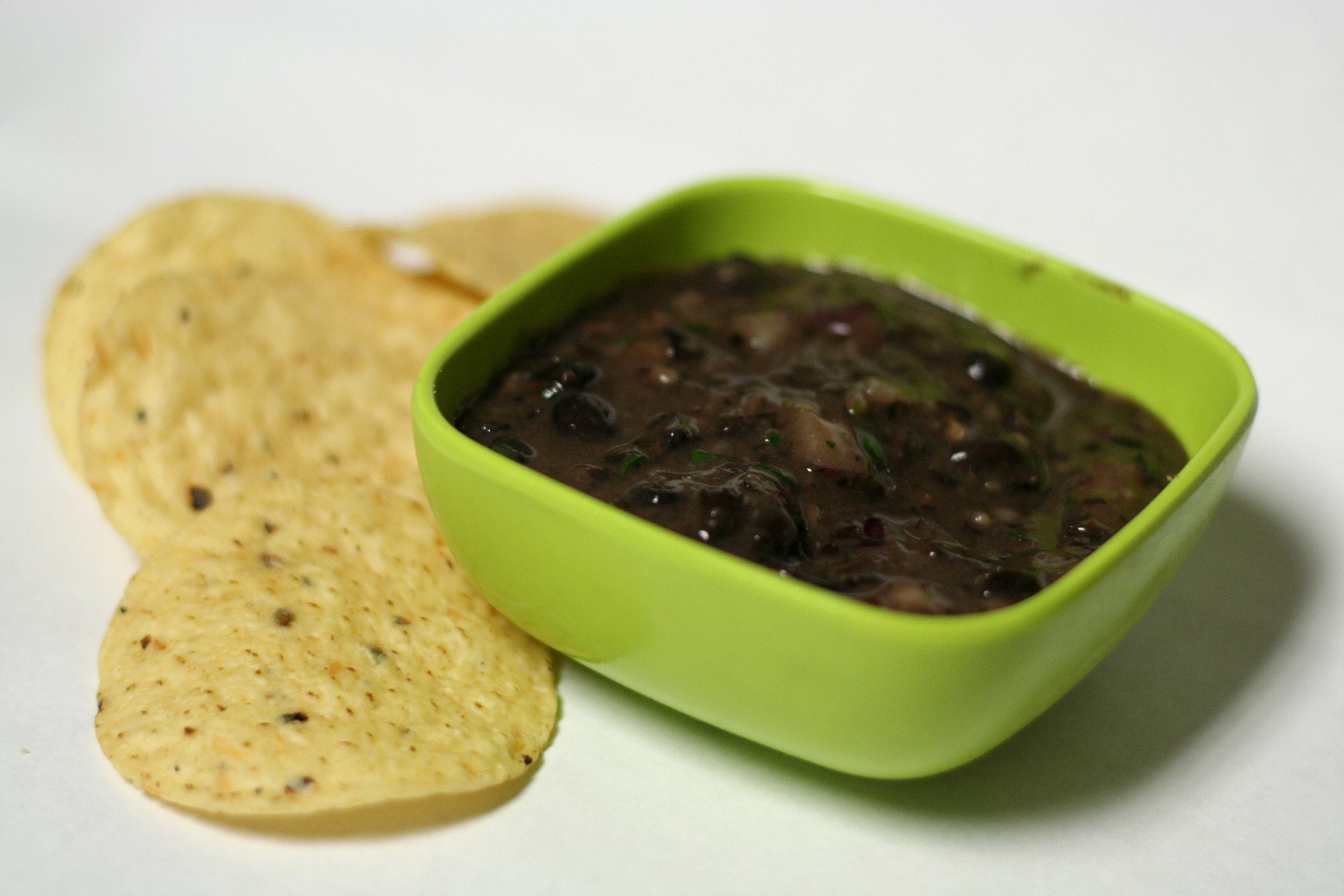
A bean dip from black beans

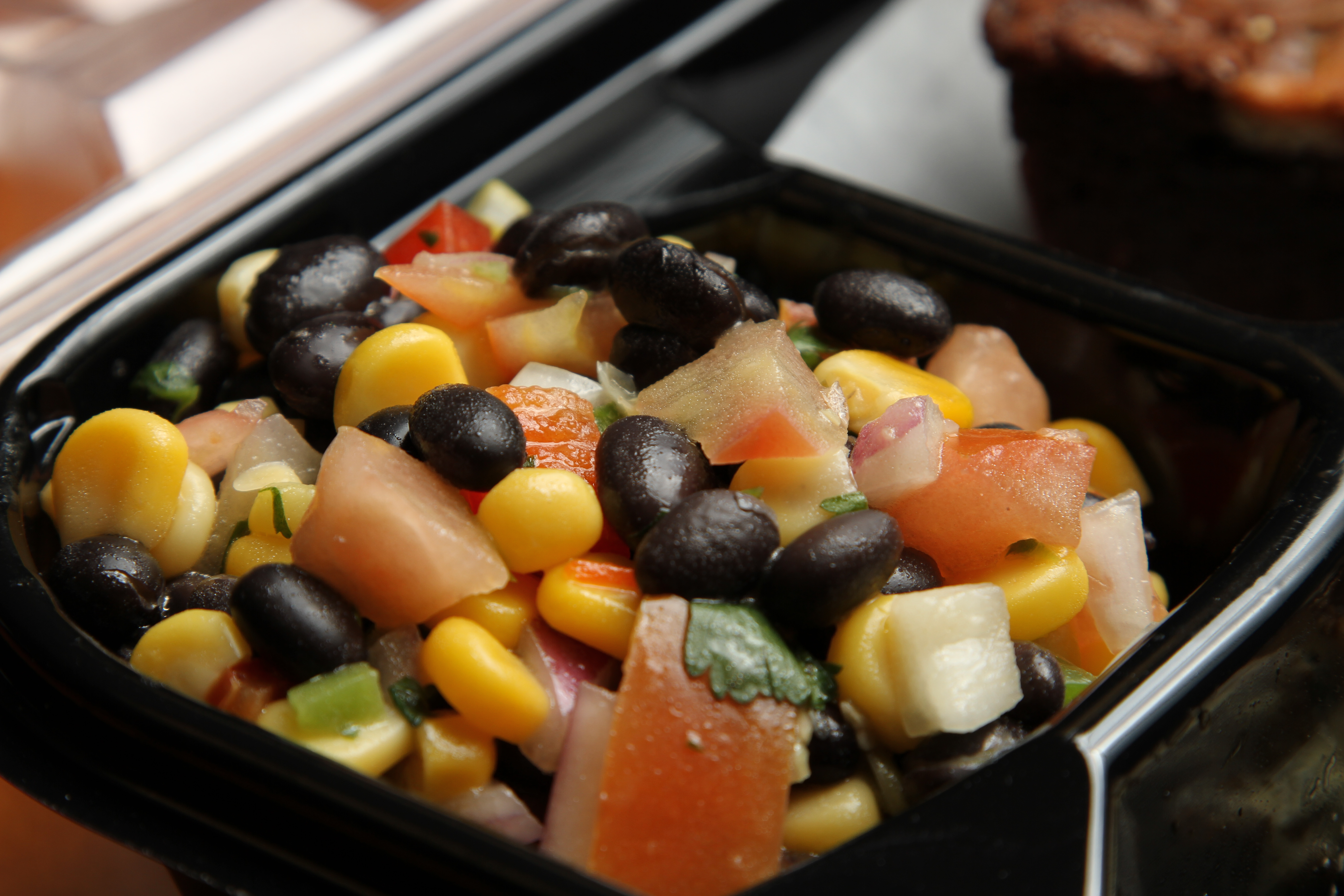
Salad with corn and beans

== See also ==
- Pinto bean
- Kidney bean
- Bolita bean
