= Nam Dok Mai =

Mango cultivar

Mangifera 'Nam Dok Mai'
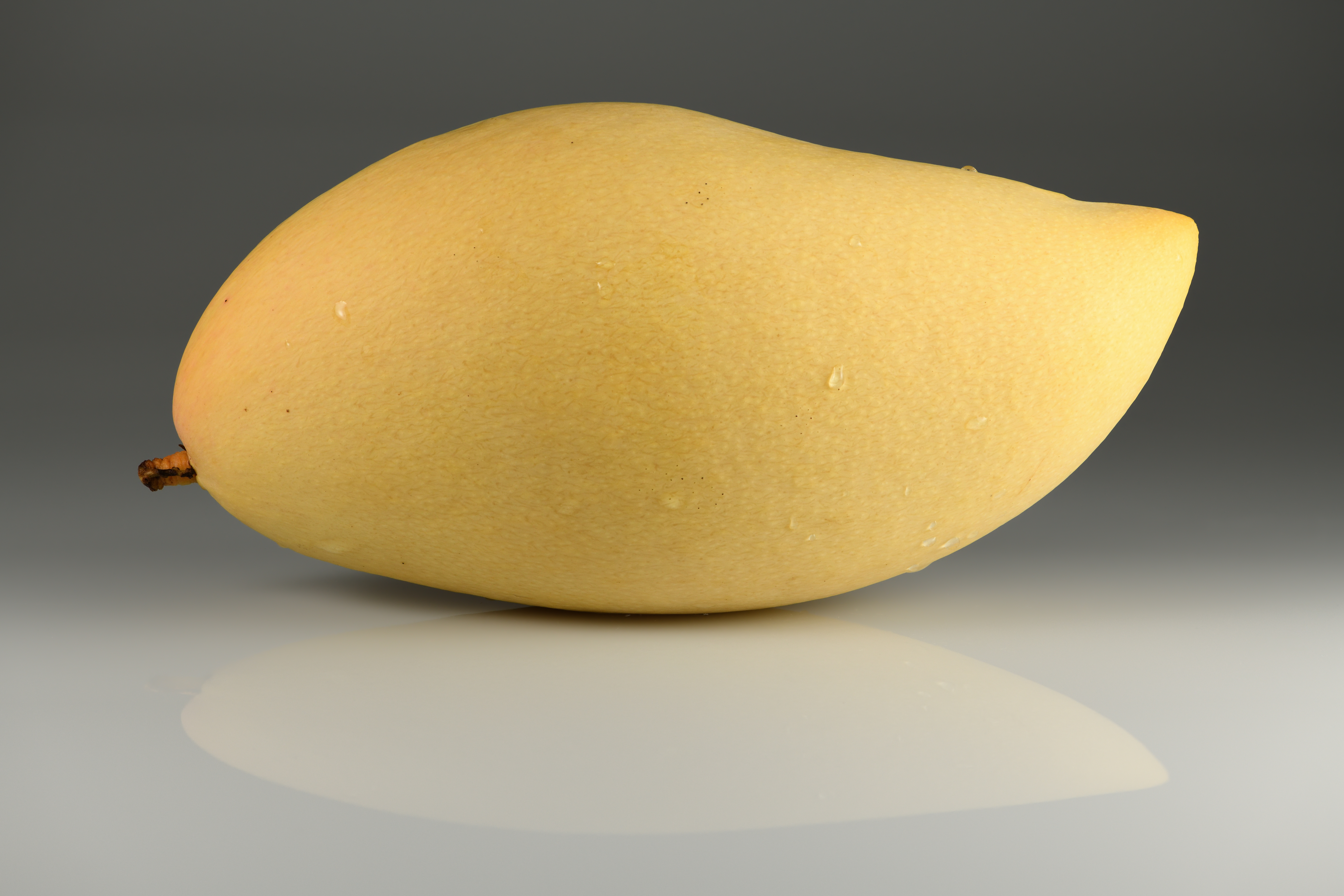
- Genus: Mangifera
- Cultivar: 'Nam Dok Mai'
- Origin: Thailand

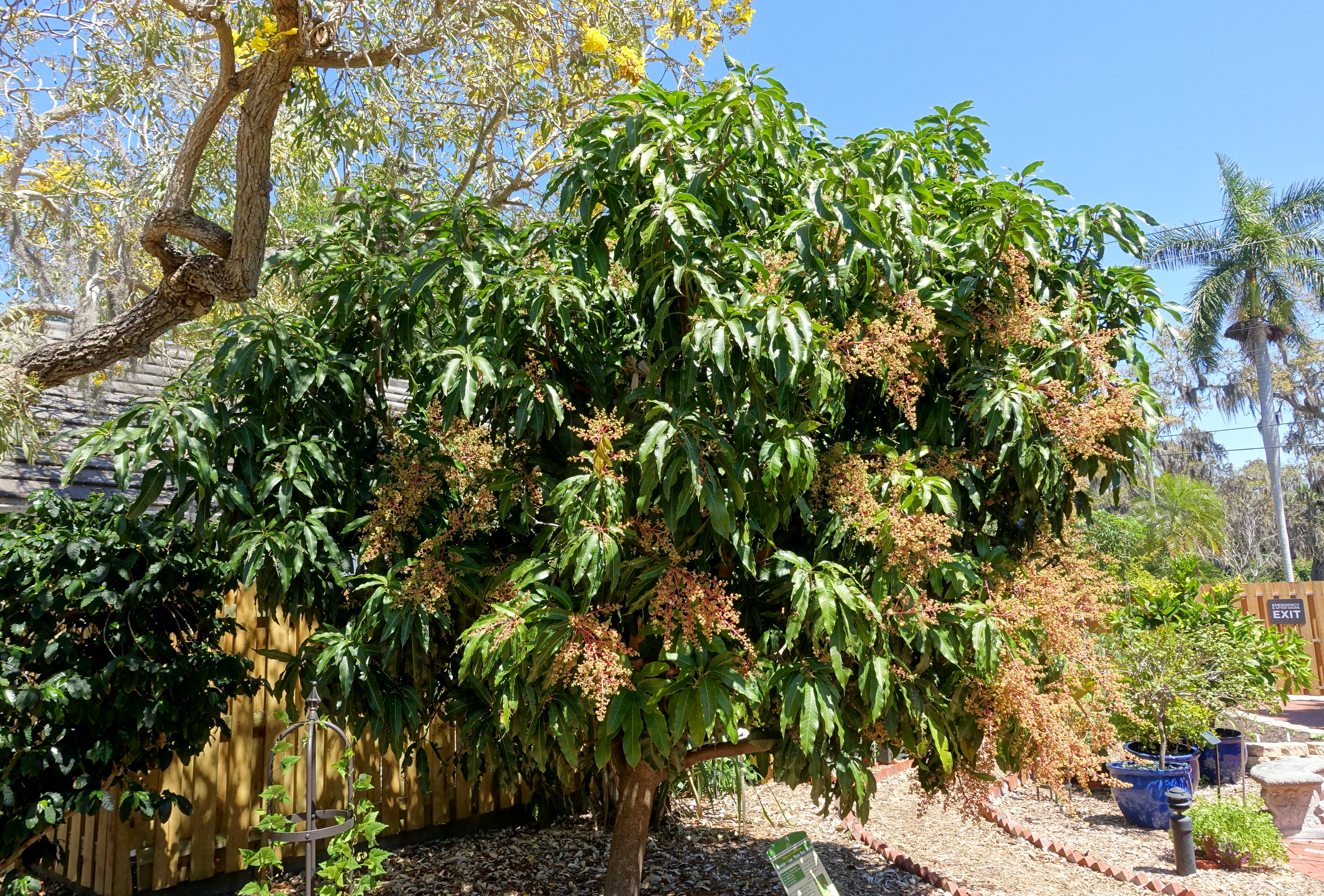
Nam Dok Mai specimen at the Marie Selby Botanical Gardens in Sarasota, Florida

The Nam Dok Mai mango (Thai: น้ำดอกไม้, also spelled Nam Doc Mai) is a mango cultivar which originated in Thailand. It is the most popular mango variety in Thailand, and is grown commercially in Australia and Colombia as well, albeit as a minor variety.

The Nam Dok Mai tree is medium-sized, and can potentially reach heights of over six metres. It is an early-midseason variety, with the potential for multiple crops in a year. The fruit is elongated, with a prominent beak, and is normally yellow with green spots. It is a polyembryonic-seeded variety. The flesh of the fruit is known for having very little fibre, strong and pleasant aroma, and very sweet taste.

Nam Dok Mai trees are planted in the USDA germplasm repository in Miami, Florida, as well as the University of Florida's Tropical Research and Education Center.

== See also ==
- List of mango cultivars
