= Glossary of French words and expressions in English =

Many words in the English language are of French origin ("gallicism"s). Most of them came from the Anglo-Norman spoken by the upper classes in England for several hundred years after the Norman Conquest, before the language settled into what became Modern English. English words of French origin, such as art, competition, force, money, and table are pronounced according to English rules of phonology, rather than French, and English speakers commonly use them without any awareness of their French origin.

This article covers French words and phrases that have entered the English lexicon without ever losing their character as Gallicisms: they remain unmistakably "French" to an English speaker. They are most common in written English, where they retain French diacritics and are usually printed in italics. In spoken English, at least some attempt is generally made to pronounce them as they would sound in French. An entirely English pronunciation is regarded as a solecism.

Some of the entries were never "good French", in the sense of being grammatical, idiomatic French usage. Others were once normal French but have either become very old-fashioned or have acquired different meanings and connotations in the original language, to the extent that a native French speaker would not understand them, either at all or in the intended sense.

== Used in English and French ==
=== A ===
à fond
lit. "to the bottom"; thoroughly, completely, with maximum effort or intensity. Often used to describe giving one's all in a particular endeavor, as in "going à fond" in sports or other activities, or as in discussion "we discussed the subject à fond".
à la
short for (ellipsis of) à la manière de; in the manner of/in the style of
à la carte
lit. "on the card, i.e. menu". In restaurants it refers to ordering individual dishes from the menu rather than a fixed-price meal. In America "à la carte menu" can be found, an oxymoron and a pleonasm.
à propos
regarding/concerning (the correct French is à propos de)
affaire de cœur
lit. a love affair
aide-de-camp
lit. "camp helper"; "camp assistant", a military officer who serves as an adjutant to a higher-ranking officer, prince or other political dignitary. In Canada, it may also refer to the honorary position a person holds as a personal assistant to a high civil servant. In French, it is written aide de camp (without any hyphens).
aide-mémoire
lit. "memory aid"; an object or memorandum to help one to remember things, or a diplomatic paper proposing the major points of discussion.
amour propre
"Self-love", self-respect.
amuse-bouche or amuse-gueule
lit. "mouth-amuser"; a single, bite-sized hors d'œuvre. In France, the exact expression used is amuse-gueule, gueule being slang for mouth (gueule is the mouth of a carnivorous animal; when used to describe a human mouth, it is vulgar—akin to "gob"— although the expression itself is not vulgar). The expression refers to a small mouthful of food, served at the discretion of the chef before a meal as an hors d'oeuvre or between main courses.
ancien régime
a sociopolitical or other system that no longer exists, an allusion to pre-revolutionary France (used with capital letters in French with this meaning: Ancien Régime)
aperçu
preview; a first impression; initial insight.

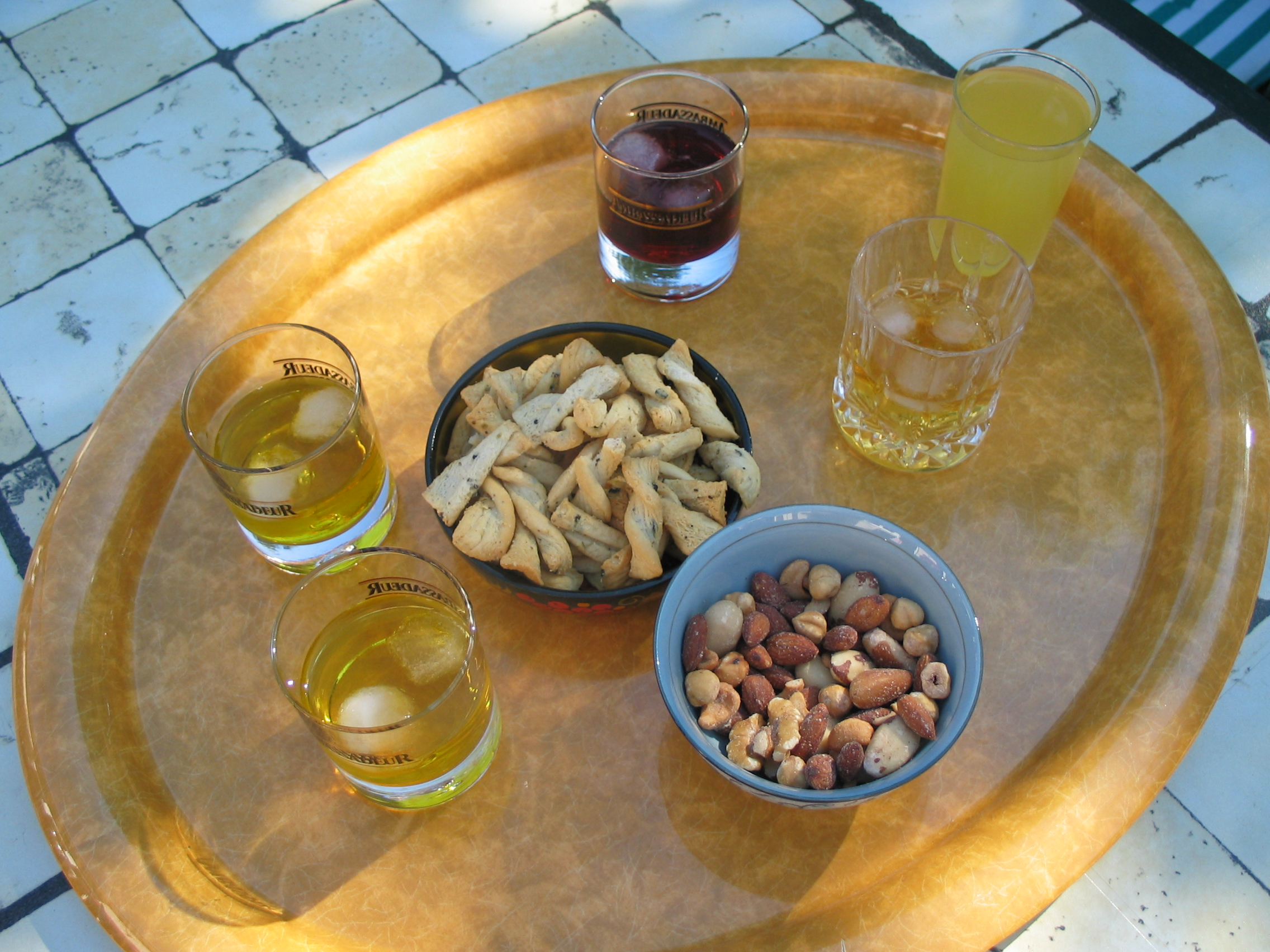
Apéritifs with amuse-gueules

apéritif or aperitif
lit. [drink] that "opens" the appetite, a pre-meal drink. In colloquial French, un apéritif is usually shortened to un apéro.
appellation contrôlée
supervised use of a name. For the conventional use of the term, see Appellation d'origine contrôlée.
appetence
1. A natural craving or desire 2. An attraction or affinity; from the French "appétence", derived from "appétit" (appetite). In French, this has a high register language.
après moi, le déluge
lit. "After me, the flood", a remark attributed to Louis XV of France, referring to the impending end of a functioning French monarchy and predicting the French Revolution. It is derived from Madame de Pompadour's après nous, le déluge, "after us, the flood". The Royal Air Force No. 617 Squadron, famously known as the "Dambusters", uses this as its motto.

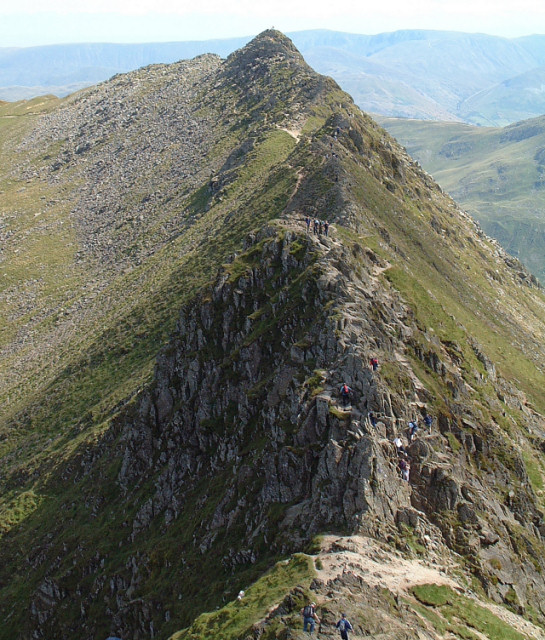
Arête

arête
a narrow ridge. In French, also fishbone; edge of a polyhedron or graph; bridge of the nose.
armoire
a type of cabinet; wardrobe.
arrière-pensée
ulterior motive; concealed thought, plan, or motive.
Art Nouveau
a style of decoration and architecture of the late 19th and early 20th centuries. It takes capitals in French (Art Nouveau).
attaché
a person attached to an embassy; in French it is also the past participle of the verb attacher (= to fasten, to tighten, to be linked)
attaque au fer
an attack on the opponent's blade in fencing, e.g. beat, expulsion, pressure.
au contraire
on the contrary.
au courant
up-to-date; abreast of current affairs.
au fait
being familiar with or know about something.
au gratin
"with gratings", anything that is grated onto a food dish. In English, specifically 'with cheese'.
au jus
lit. "with juice", referring to a food course served with sauce. Often redundantly formulated, as in 'Open-faced steak sandwich, served with au jus.' No longer used in French, except for the colloquial, être au jus (to be informed).
au naturel
1. a. Nude. b. In a natural state: an au naturel hairstyle. 2. Cooked simply. Also used in French heraldry to mean "proper" i.e. in natural colours.
au pair
a young foreigner who does domestic chores in exchange for room and board. In France, those chores are mainly child care/education. Lit. "on par", in the sense of "equal to" (see parity), indicating that the person is considered an equal member of the household rather than a servant.
au revoir!
"See you later!" In French, a contraction of Au plaisir de vous revoir ('to the pleasure of seeing you again').
au sec
lit. "almost dry", reducing liquid to the point of almost being dry though the food is still moist.
avant-garde (pl. avant-gardes)
applied to cutting-edge or radically innovative movements in art, music and literature; figuratively 'on the edge', literally, a military term, meaning 'vanguard' (which is a corruption of avant-garde) or "advance guard", in other words, "first to attack" (antonym of arrière-garde).
avant la lettre
used to describe something or someone seen as a forerunner of something (such as an artistic or political movement) before that thing was recognized and named, e.g., "a post-modernist avant la lettre", "a feminist avant la lettre". The expression literally means "before the letter", i.e., "before it had a name". An alternative modern French version of this expression is avant l'heure.
avoirdupois
used in Middle English, avoir de pois = commodities sold by weight, alteration of Old French aveir de peis = "goods of weight". In Modern French, only used to refer to English weight measures, as in une livre avoirdupois (1 lb. avdp) as opposed to une livre troy (1 lb. troy).

=== B ===
baguette
a long, narrow loaf of white bread with a crisp crust, often called "French bread" or "French stick" in the United Kingdom. In French, a baguette is any long and narrow stick-like object such as a chopstick; a rectangular diamond cut to 25 facets and a magic wand.
banquette
a long upholstered bench or a sofa.
beaucoup de
Used interchangeably with the English equivalent of "lots of/many/a great number of". Appropriate when the speaker wants to convey a greater positive connotation and/or greater emphasis. Often used as an informal expression, mostly in small regional dialect-pockets in the Canadian Prairies and the American South, especially in Alberta and Louisiana respectively.
Beau geste
lit. "beautiful gesture", a gracious gesture, noble in form but often futile or meaningless in substance. This French expression has been on the periphery of the standard English lexicon since the appearance of P. C. Wren's Beau Geste (1924), the first of his Foreign Legion novels.
Beau idéal
lit. "beautiful ideal," used to suggest the perfect or most supreme version of something to exist. The expression was coined during the late 18th century during the aesthetic period known as classicism. Invoking the balance and refinement of Greek and Roman art and architecture, the term was used for examples of such that conformed to purity, wholesomeness, equilibrium, and simple elegance.
Beaux-Arts
monumental architectural style of the early 20th century made famous by the Académie des Beaux-Arts.
bel esprit (pl. beaux esprits)
lit. "fine mind"; a cultivated, highly intelligent person.
Belle Époque
a period in European social history that began during the late 19th century and lasted until World War I.
belles-lettres
lit. "fine letters"; literature regarded for its aesthetic value rather than its didactic or informative content; also, light, stylish writings, usually on literary or intellectual subjects.
bête noire
lit "black beast"; nemesis.
bien entendu
well understood, well known, obvious – "of course".
bien pensant
lit. "well thinking"; right thinking, orthodox. Formerly implied wilful blindness to dangers or suffering faced by others but, nowadays corresponds to "politically correct". The noun form bien-pensance is rarely seen in English.
billet-doux
lit. "sweet note", love letter
blasé
unimpressed with something because of overfamiliarity, jaded.
bon appétit
lit. "good appetite"; "enjoy your meal".
bon mot (pl. bons mots)
well-chosen word(s), particularly a witty remark ("each bon mot which falls from his lips is analysed and filed away for posterity", The European Magazine, August 29 – September 4, 1996)
bon vivant
one who enjoys the good life, an epicurean.
bon voyage
lit. "good journey"; have a good trip!
boudoir
lit. "sulking place"; a woman's private dressing or sitting room in a house.
bourgeois
member of the bourgeoisie, originally councilmen, burghers or even aristocrats living in towns in the Middle Ages. Now the term is derogatory, and it applies to a person whose beliefs, attitudes, and practices are conventionally middle-class.

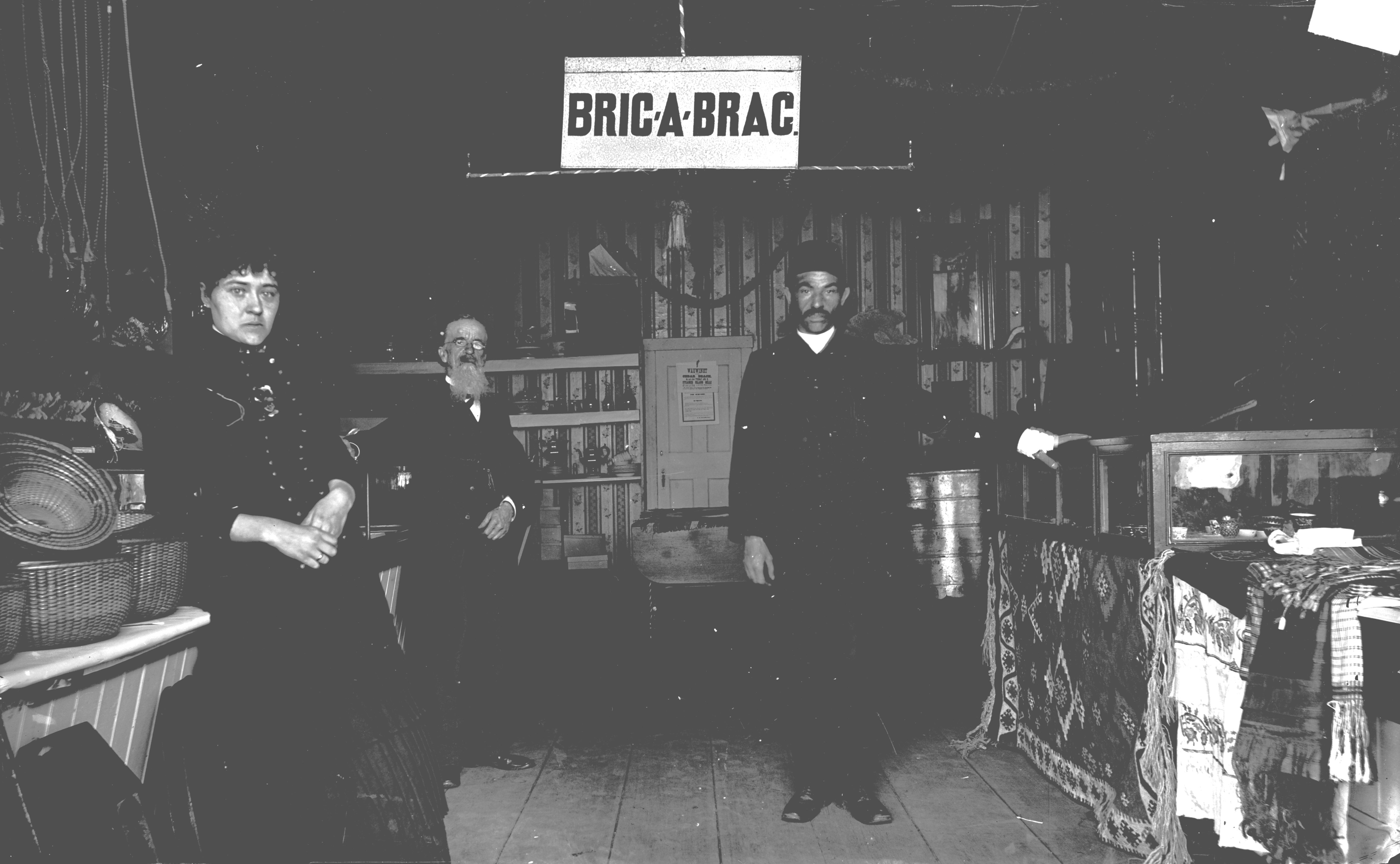
Bric-à-brac

bric-à-brac
small ornamental objects, less valuable than antiques; a collection of old furniture, china, plates and curiosities. Cf. de bric et de broc, corresponding to English "by hook or by crook", and brack, refuse.
bricolage
to improvise or assemble something useful from what happens to be at hand; to expedite or economize a project with readily available components, versus a kit or outside sources; to reuse spare parts for other than their original purpose; to create something new by arranging old material; to create a new, valuable purpose for an object that has completed its original purpose and would otherwise be discarded. Connotes an intrepid do-it-yourself spirit or clever repurposing. Differs from tinkering which merely modifies an existing arrangement. The term is used metaphorically to describe inventive philosophy, theories, and practices in business and academic fields, where new concepts are found in interactions of old ideas.

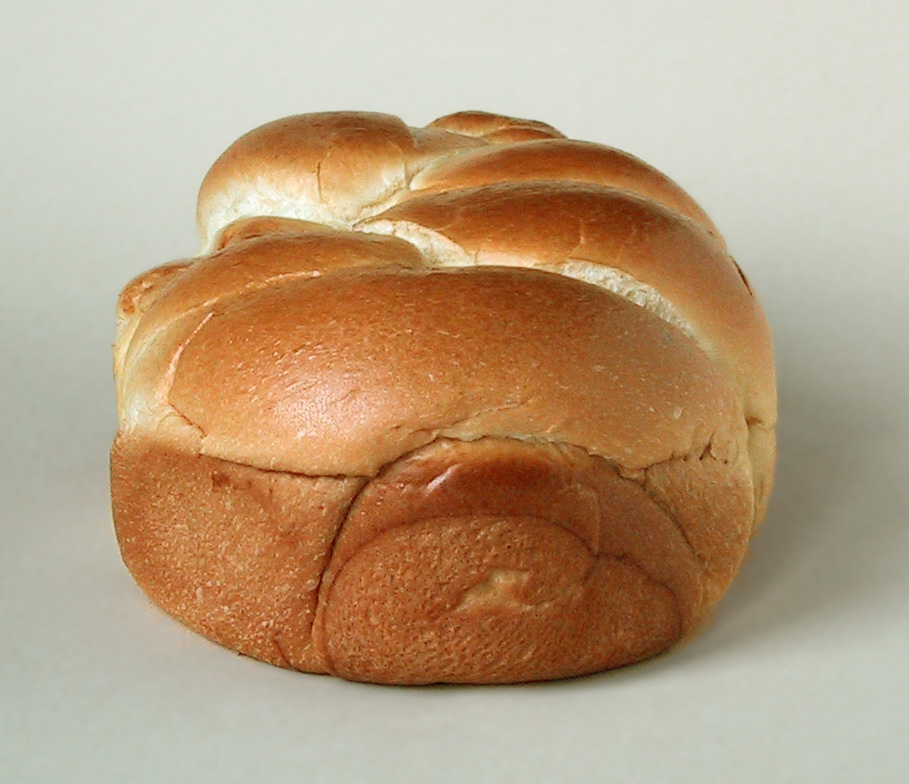
Brioche

brioche
a sweet yeast bun, kind of a crossover between a popover and a light muffin; French also use the term as slang for 'pot belly', because of the overhang effect.
bureau (pl. bureaux)
government office; an agency for information exchange. Also means "desk" in French, and in the U.K.
bureau de change
a location where one country's money can be exchanged for another.

=== C ===
ça ne fait rien
"that doesn't matter"; rendered as san fairy Ann in British World War I slang.
cache
a collection of items of the same type stored in a hidden or inaccessible place (such as in an oubliette). Often used for weapons.
cachet
lit. "stamp"; a distinctive quality; quality, prestige.
café
a coffee shop (also used in French for "coffee").

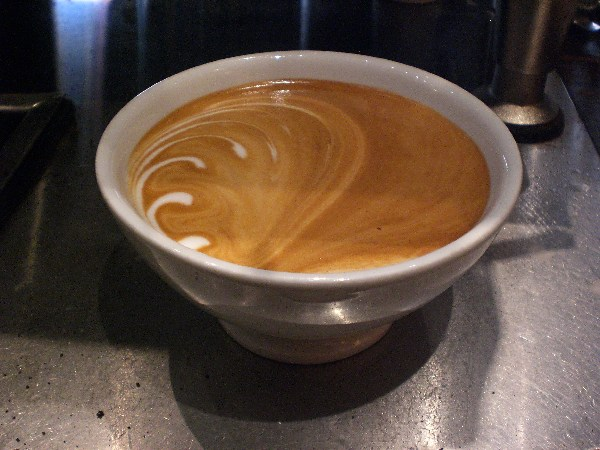
Café au lait

café au lait
coffee with milk; or a light-brown color. In medicine, it is also used to describe a birthmark that is of a light-brown color (café au lait spot).
calque
a copied term/thing. In linguistics, a loan translation.
canard
(canard means "duck" in French)

1. an unfounded rumor or anecdote.
2. a leading airfoil attached to an aircraft forward of the main wing.
3. a slang word for "newspaper".
4. a piece of sugar slightly soused with coffee or cognac (or another strong alcohol).

canapé
A small, prepared and usually decorative food, eaten by hand, often in one bite. In French, it can also refer to a "sofa".
carte blanche
lit. "white card" (i.e. blank check); unlimited authority.
carte de visite
lit. "visiting card"; a calling card.
cause célèbre
controversial celebrity issue.

c'est la guerre: "That's war!", or...

c'est la vie: "That's life!" or "Such is life!"

Though either foreign expression can be used to say that life is harsh but that one must accept it, the former may imply a more deliberate cause and the latter more accidental.

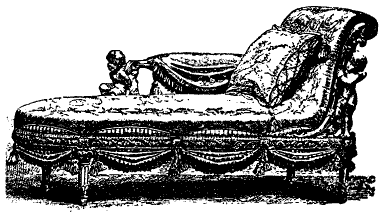
Chaise longue

chaise longue
a long chair for reclining; sometimes misspelled "chaise lounge."
Champs-Élysées
lit. "Elysian Fields"; Avenue des Champs-Élysées, one of the broadest boulevards in Paris. Often referred to as simply les Champs.
chanteuse
'(female) singer', a female singer, especially at a nightclub, bar, cabaret, or diner.
chargé d'affaires
a diplomat left in charge of day-to-day business at a diplomatic mission. For example, within the United States Department of State, a "chargé" is any officer left in charge of the mission in the absence of the mission's titular leader.
charrette
a collaborative session in which a group of designers draft a solution to a design problem.

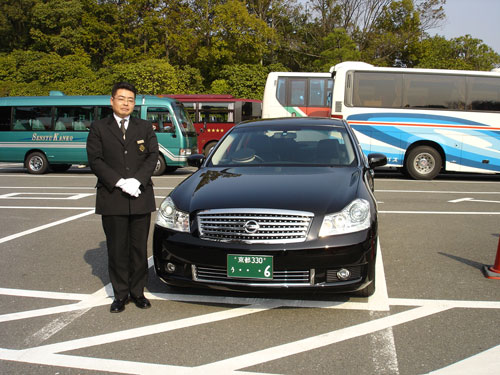
Chauffeur

chauffeur
driver.
chef d'œuvre
a masterpiece.
cherchez la femme
"look for / seek the woman", in the sense that, when a man behaves out of character or in an otherwise apparently inexplicable manner, the reason may be found in his trying to cover up an illicit affair with a woman, or to impress or gain favour with a woman. This expression was first used in a novel by Alexandre Dumas (père), in the third chapter of Les Mohicans de Paris (1854), in the form of cherchons la femme ("let's look for the woman"). The expression is found in John Latey's 1878 English translation: "Ah! Monsieur Jackal, you were right when you said, 'Seek the woman.'" The phrase was adopted into everyday English use and crossed the Atlantic by 1909.
chez
at the house of: often used in the names of restaurants and the like; Chez Marie = "Marie's".
chic
stylish.

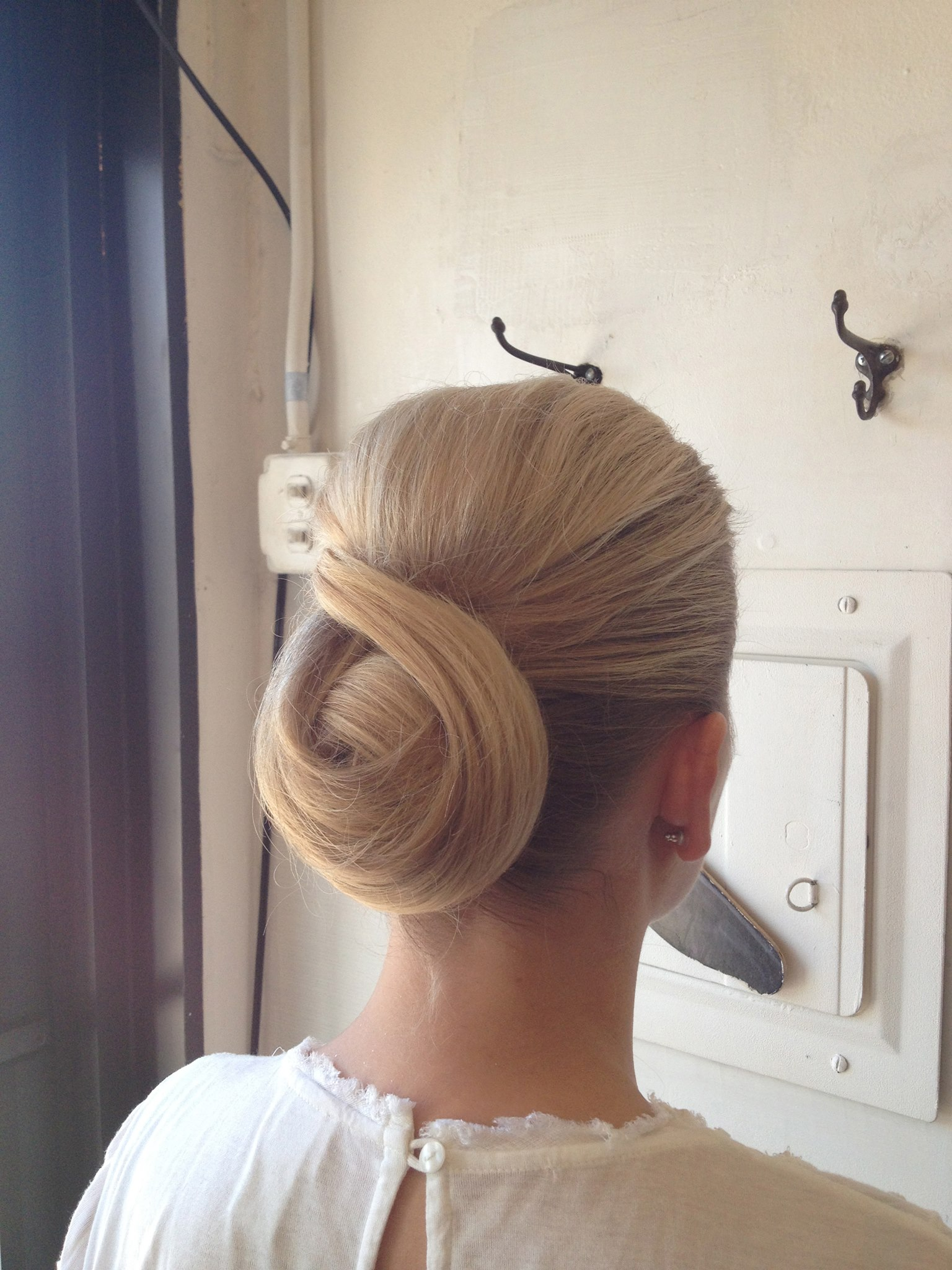
Chignon

chignon
a hairstyle worn in a roll at the nape of the neck.
cinéma pur
an avant-garde film movement which was born in Paris in the 1920s and 1930s.
cinéma vérité
realism in documentary filmmaking. "Vérité" means "truth".
cliché
originally referred to a printer's block used to reproduce type, compare the original meaning of stereotype. A phrase that has become trite through overuse; a stereotype.
clique
a small exclusive group of friends; always used in a pejorative way in French and, usually, in English. Often pronounced the same as "click" in British English.
cloisonné
an ancient technique for decorating metalwork objects.
commandant
commanding officer of a base, depot or training area. In France, used for an airline pilot (le commandant de bord), in the Army as appellative for a chef de bataillon or a chef d'escadron (roughly equivalent to a major) or in the Navy for any officer from capitaine de corvette to capitaine de vaisseau (equivalent to the Army's majors, lieutenant-colonels and colonels) or for any officer heading a ship.
comme ci, comme ça
lit. "like this, like that"; neither good nor bad, so-so.
communiqué
lit. "communicated"; an official communication.
concierge
a receptionist at a hotel or residence.
concordat
an agreement; a treaty; when used with a capital C in French, it refers to the treaty between the French State and Judaeo-Christian religions during the French Empire (Napoleon): priests, ministers and rabbis became civil servants. This treaty was abolished in 1905 (law Church-State separation) but is still in use in Alsace-Lorraine (those territories were under German administration during 1871–1918).
confrère (also confrere)
a colleague, an associate
contre-coup
against the blow. This word describes the repercussion of a physical or mental shock, or an indirect consequence of an event.

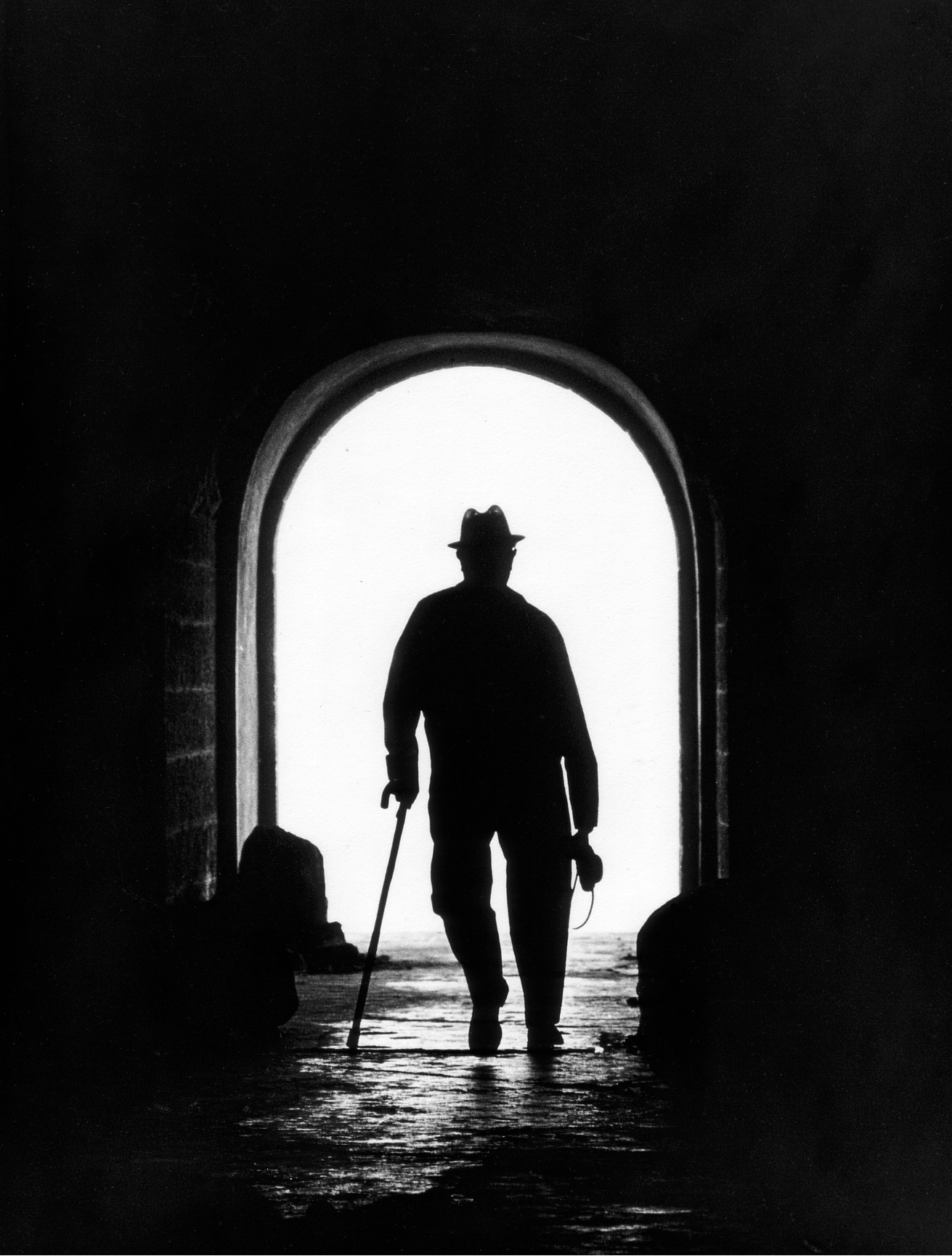
Contre-jour

contre-jour
against daylight. This word (mostly used in art namely photography, cinema or painting) describes the light that illumines an object from the other point of view.
contretemps
an awkward clash; a delay.
coquette
a flirtatious girl; a tease.
cordon bleu
(lit. 'blue ribbon'). A "cordon bleu" may refer to several things, both in French and in English :

1. A person who excels in cooking.
2. An award given to such a person.
3. An international group of hospitality management and cooking schools teaching French cuisine, founded in France.
4. An escalope of veal, chicken or pork stuffed with ham and cheese, then breaded and fried.

cordon sanitaire
a policy of containment directed against a hostile entity or ideology; a chain of buffer states; lit. "quarantine line".
corniche
a road that clings like a ledge to the side of a cliff or mountain.
cornichon
a small pickled cucumber; French for "little horn".
cortège
a funeral procession; in French has a broader meaning and refers to all kinds of processions.
coup de foudre
lit. "thunderbolt" ("strike of thunder"); a sudden unforeseen event, usually used to describe love at first sight.
coup d'état
political coup, government overthrow
coup de grâce
the final blow that results in victory (lit. 'blow of mercy'), historically used in the context of the battlefield to refer to the killing of badly wounded enemy soldiers, now more often used in a figurative context (e.g., business).
coup de main
(lit. 'a blow with the hand'), means "help from someone". Example: "Besoin d'un coup de main?" means "Need help?"

coup de maître
stroke of the master, master stroke. This word describes a planned action skilfully done. See also tour de force below
coup de théâtre
a dramatic turn of events.
coup d'œil
lit. "a blow (or touch) of the eye"; a glance.
couture
litt. sewing. Fashion (usually refers to high fashion). haute couture in French.
couturier
a fashion designer (usually refers to high fashion, rather than everyday clothes design. In French, it means 'tailor'; a couturière is a seamstress.
crèche
a nativity display; more commonly (in the United Kingdom), a place where children are left by their parents for short periods in the supervision of childminders; both meanings still exist in French.
crème brûlée
lit. "burnt cream"; a dessert consisting primarily of custard and toasted sugar, that is, caramel.
crème de la crème
best of the best, "cream of the cream", used to describe highly skilled people or objects. A synonymous expression in French is fin du fin.
crème fraîche
lit. "fresh cream", a heavy cream slightly soured with bacterial culture, but not as sour or as thick as sour cream and does not curdle.
crêpe
a thin sweet or savoury pancake eaten as a light meal or dessert.

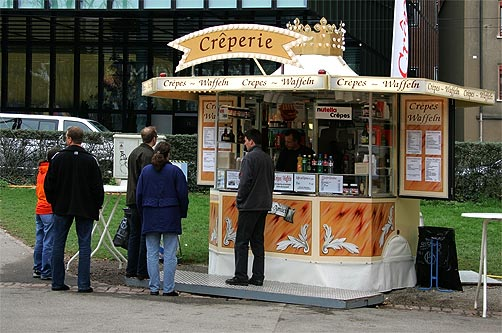
Crêperie

crêperie
a takeaway restaurant or stall, serving crêpes as a form of fast food or street food, or may be a more formal sit-down restaurant or café.
critique
a critical analysis or evaluation of a work, or the art of criticizing. From Latin criticus, from Ancient Greek κριτικός (kritikos).
croissant
a crescent-shaped bread made of flaky pastry; in French also the word for crescent.
crudités
raw vegetables, served with a dipping sauce. Always plural in English.

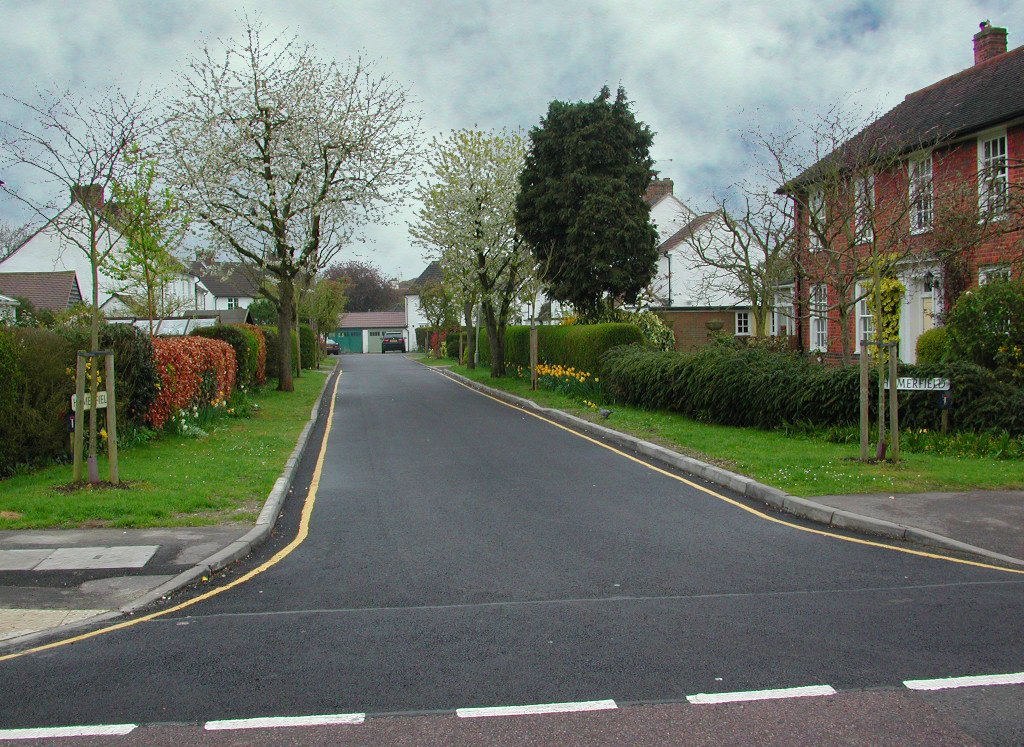
Cul-de-sac

cul-de-sac
originally "bottom of sack" and used in English in anatomy since 1738. Used for dead end (street) since 1800 in English, since 14th century in French. The often heard erroneous folk etymology "arse [buttocks] of the sack" is based on the current meaning of cul in French, but cul-de-sac is used to refer to dead ends in modern French and is not vulgar, though the terms impasse and voie sans issue are more common in modern French.

=== D ===
de rigueur
required or expected, especially in fashion or etiquette.
de trop
unnecessary, unwanted, or more than is suitable.
déclassé
inferior.
décolleté
a woman's garment with a low-cut neckline that exposes cleavage, or a situation in which a woman's chest or cleavage is exposed; décolletage is dealt with below.
décor
the layout and furnishing of a room.
découpage
decoration with cut paper.
demi-glace
a reduced wine-based sauce for meats and poultry.
demi-sec
semi-dry, usually said of wine.
déjà vu
lit. "already seen": an impression or illusion of having seen or experienced something before.
dénouement
lit. "untying": the resolution of a narrative.
dépanneur
(Quebec English) a convenience store.
dérailleur
a bicycle gear-shift mechanism.
dernier cri
lit. "latest scream": the latest fashion.
derrière
lit. "behind": rear, buttocks.
déshabillé
partially clad or scantily dressed; also a special type of garment.
détente
easing of diplomatic tension.
digestif
a digestive aid, esp., an after-dinner drink, as brandy.
directeur sportif
lit. "sports director". A person responsible for the operation of a cycling team during a road bicycle race. In French, it means any kind of sports director.
divertissement
an amusing diversion; entertainment.
dossier
a file containing detailed information about a person. In modern French it can be any type of file, including a computer directory. In slang, J'ai des dossiers sur toi ("I have files about you") means having materials for blackmail.
doyen
the senior member of a group; the feminine is doyenne. Also dean (of faculty, or medicine).

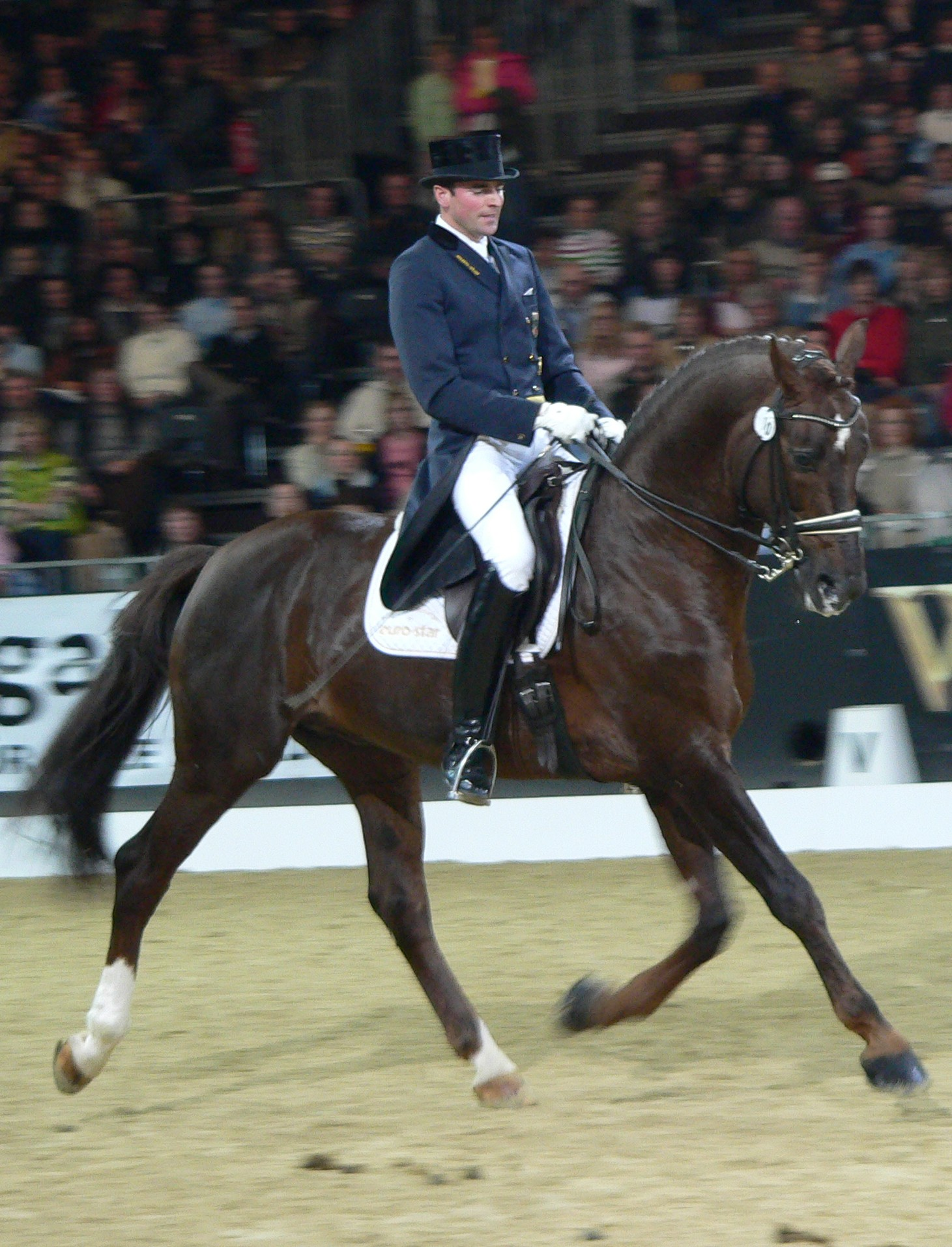
Dressage

dressage
a form of competitive horse training, in French has the broader meaning of taming any kind of animal.
droit du seigneur
lit. "right of the lord": the purported right of a lord in feudal times to take the virginity of one of his vassals' brides on her wedding night (in precedence to her new husband). The French term for this hypothetical custom is droit de cuissage (from cuisse: thigh).
du jour
lit. "of the day": said of something fashionable or hip for a day and quickly forgotten; today's choice on the menu, as soup du jour.

=== E ===
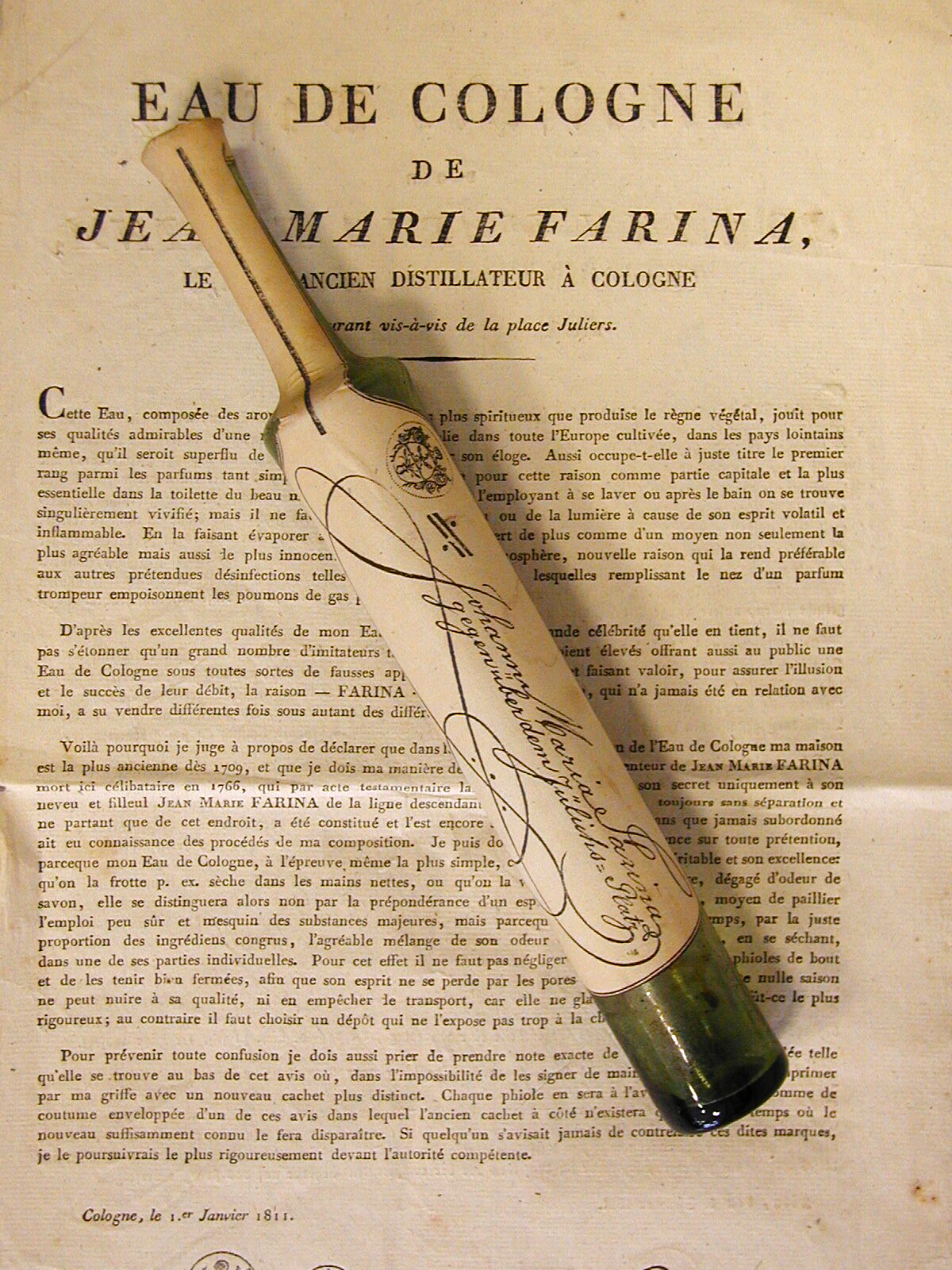
eau de Cologne

eau de Cologne
a type of perfume, originating in Cologne. Its Italian creator used a French name to commercialize it, Cologne at that time being under the control of France.
eau de toilette
lit. 'grooming water'. It usually refers to an aromatic product that is less expensive than a perfume because it has less of the aromatic compounds and is more for an everyday use. Cannot be shortened to eau, which means something else altogether in French (water).

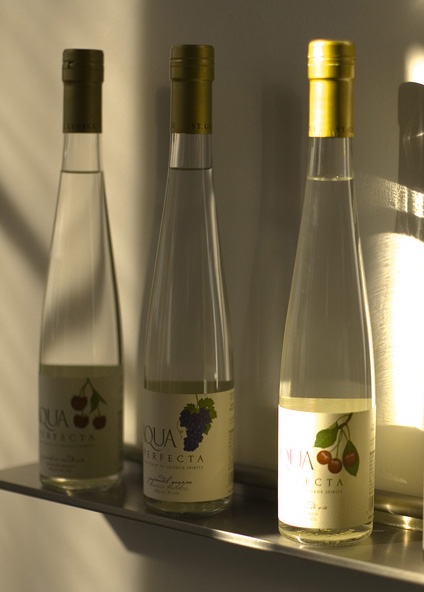
eau de vie

eau de vie
lit. "water of life" (cf. Aquavit and whisky), a type of fruit brandy.
écarté
a card game; also a ballet position.
échappé
dance movement foot position.
éclair
a cream and chocolate icing pastry.
éclat
great brilliance, as of performance or achievement. Conspicuous success. Great acclamation or applause.
écorché
flayed; biological graphic or model with skin removed.
élan
a distinctive flair or style.
élan vital
lit. "vital ardor"; the vital force hypothesized by Henri Bergson as a source of efficient causation and evolution in nature; also called "life-force"
embonpoint
a plump, hourglass figure.
éminence grise
lit. "grey eminence": a publicity-shy person with little formal power but great influence over those in authority.
en banc
court hearing of the entire group of judges instead of a subset panel.
en bloc
as a group.
en coulisse
lit. "in the wings"; behind the scenes, out of public view. Originally a theatrical term referring to the side areas of a stage hidden from the audience's view, now used figuratively to describe activities conducted privately or away from public attention.
en garde
"[be] on [your] guard". "On guard" is of course perfectly good English: the French spelling is used for the fencing term.
en passant
in passing; term used in chess and in neurobiology ("synapse en passant.")

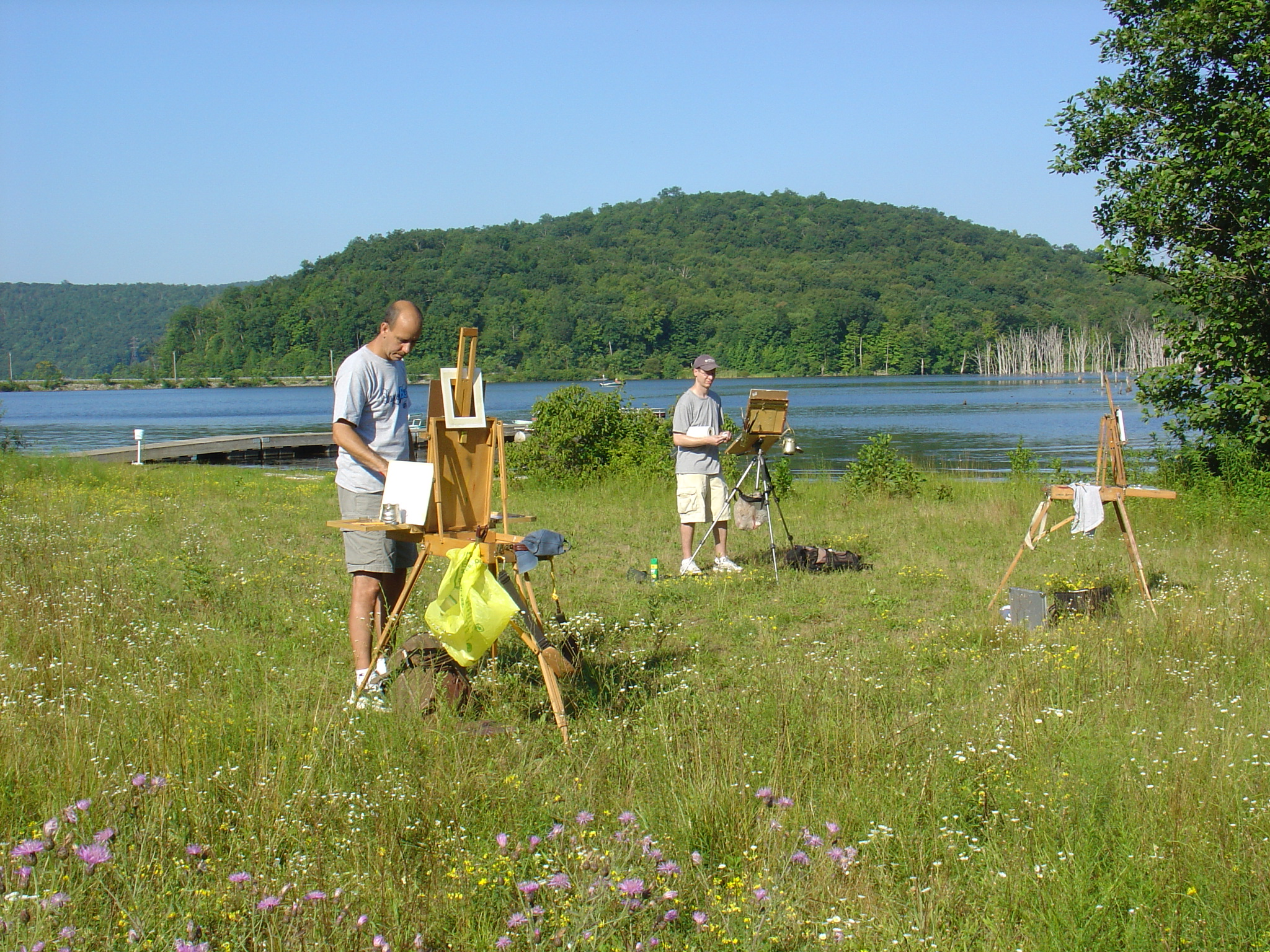
En plein air

en plein air
lit. "in the open air"; particularly used to describe the act of painting outdoors.

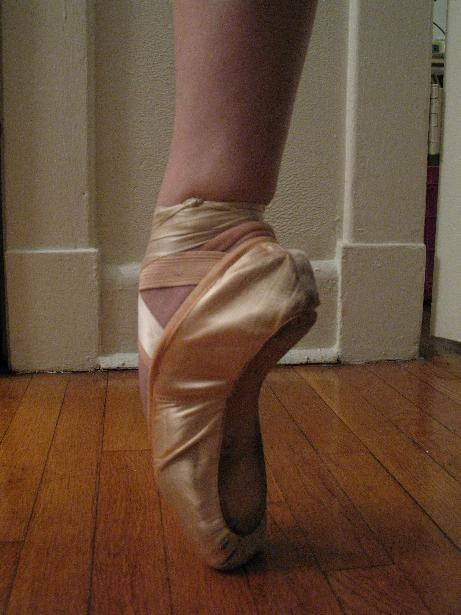
en pointe

en pointe
(in ballet) on tiptoe. Though used in French in this same context, it is not an expression as such. A pointe is the ballet figure where one stands on tiptoes. The expression "en pointe", though, means "in an acute angle", and, figuratively, it qualifies the most progressive or modern things (ideas, industry).
en route
on the way. Often written and pronounced "on route" in British English.
enfant terrible
lit. "terrible child"; a disruptively unconventional person.
ennui
a gripping listlessness or melancholia caused by boredom; depression; in French, it means only "boredom".
entente
diplomatic agreement or cooperation. L'Entente Cordiale (the Cordial Agreement) refers to the good diplomatic relationship between France and United Kingdom before the first World War.
entre nous
lit. "between us"; confidentially.
entrée
lit. "entrance"; the first course of a meal (UK English); used to denote the main dish or course of a meal (US English).
entremets
desserts/sweet dishes. More literally, a side dish that can be served between the courses of a meal.
entrepreneur
a person who undertakes and operates a new enterprise or venture and assumes some accountability for the inherent risks.
épater la bourgeoisie or épater le bourgeois
lit. "to shock the middle classes", a rallying cry for the French Decadent poets of the late 19th century including Charles Baudelaire and Arthur Rimbaud.
escargot
snail; in English, used only as a culinary term.
esprit de corps
lit. "spirit of the body [group]": a feeling of solidarity among members of a group; morale. Often used in connection with a military force.
esprit de l'escalier
lit. "wit of the stairs"; a concise, clever statement that one thinks of too late, that is, on the stairs leaving the scene. The expression was created by French philosopher Denis Diderot.
l'État, c'est moi!
lit. "I am the state!" — attributed to the archetypal absolute monarch, Louis XIV.
étude
a musical composition designed to provide practice in a particular technical skill in the performance of an instrument. French for "study."
étui
small ornamental case for needles or cosmetics.
excusez-moi
"Excuse me".
extraordinaire
extraordinary, usually as a following adjective, as "musician extraordinaire."

=== F ===
façade
the front of an edifice (from the Italian facciata, or face); a fake persona, as in "putting on a façade" (the ç is pronounced like an s)
fait accompli
lit. "accomplished fact"; something that has already happened and is thus unlikely to be reversed; a done deal. In French, the term is primarily used in the expression placer/mettre quelqu'un devant le fait accompli, meaning to present somebody with a fait accompli. Also see point of no return.
faute de mieux
for want of better.
faites comme chez vous
Make yourself at home.
faux
false, ersatz, fake.
faux pas
lit. "false step": violation of accepted, although unwritten, social rules.
femme fatale
lit. "deadly woman": an attractive woman who seduces and takes advantage of men for her personal goals, after which she discards or abandons them. It extends to describe an attractive woman with whom a relationship is likely to result, or has already resulted, in pain and sorrow.
feuilleton
lit. "little leaf of paper": a periodical, or part of a periodical, consisting chiefly of non-political news and gossip, literature and art criticism, a chronicle of the latest fashions, and epigrams, charades and other literary trifles.
fiancé(e)
betrothed; lit. a man/woman engaged to be married.
film noir
Lit. "black film": a stylized genre of movies from the 1940s and 1950s with a focus on crime and amorality.
fils
lit. "son": used after a man's surname to distinguish a son from a father, as Alexandre Dumas, fils.
fin de siècle
The end of the century, a term which typically encompasses both the meaning of the similar English idiom turn of the century and also makes reference to the closing of one era and onset of another.
flambé
a cooking procedure in which alcohol (ethanol) is added to a hot pan to create a burst of flames, meaning "flamed" in French. Also used colloquially in reference to something on fire or burned.
flambeau
a lit torch.
flâneur
a gentleman stroller of city streets; an aimless idler.

Fleur-de-lis

fleur-de-lis
a stylized-flower heraldic device; the golden fleur-de-lis on an azure background were the arms of the French Kingdom (often spelled with the old French style as "fleur-de-lys").

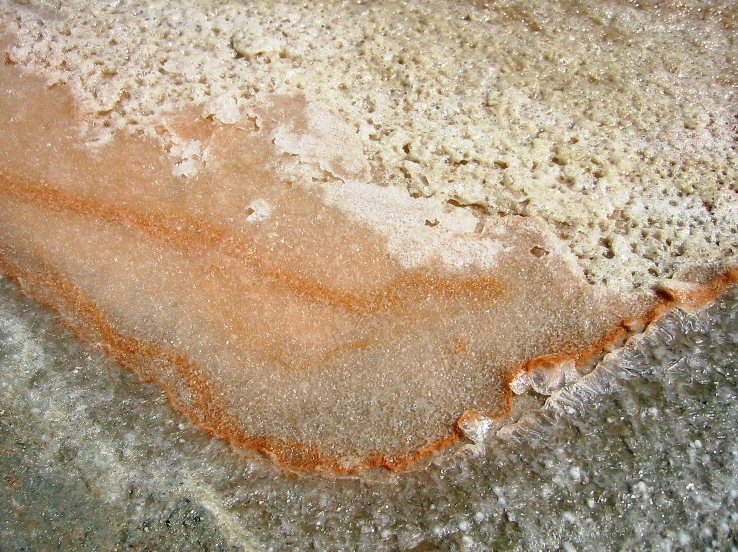
Fleur de sel

fleur de sel
lit. "flower of salt", hand-harvested sea salt collected by workers who scrape only the top layer of salt before it sinks to the bottom of large salt pans. Is one of the more expensive salts; traditional French fleur de sel is collected off the coast of Brittany most notably in the town of Guérande (Fleur de Sel de Guérande being the most revered), but also in Noirmoutier, Île de Ré and Camargue.

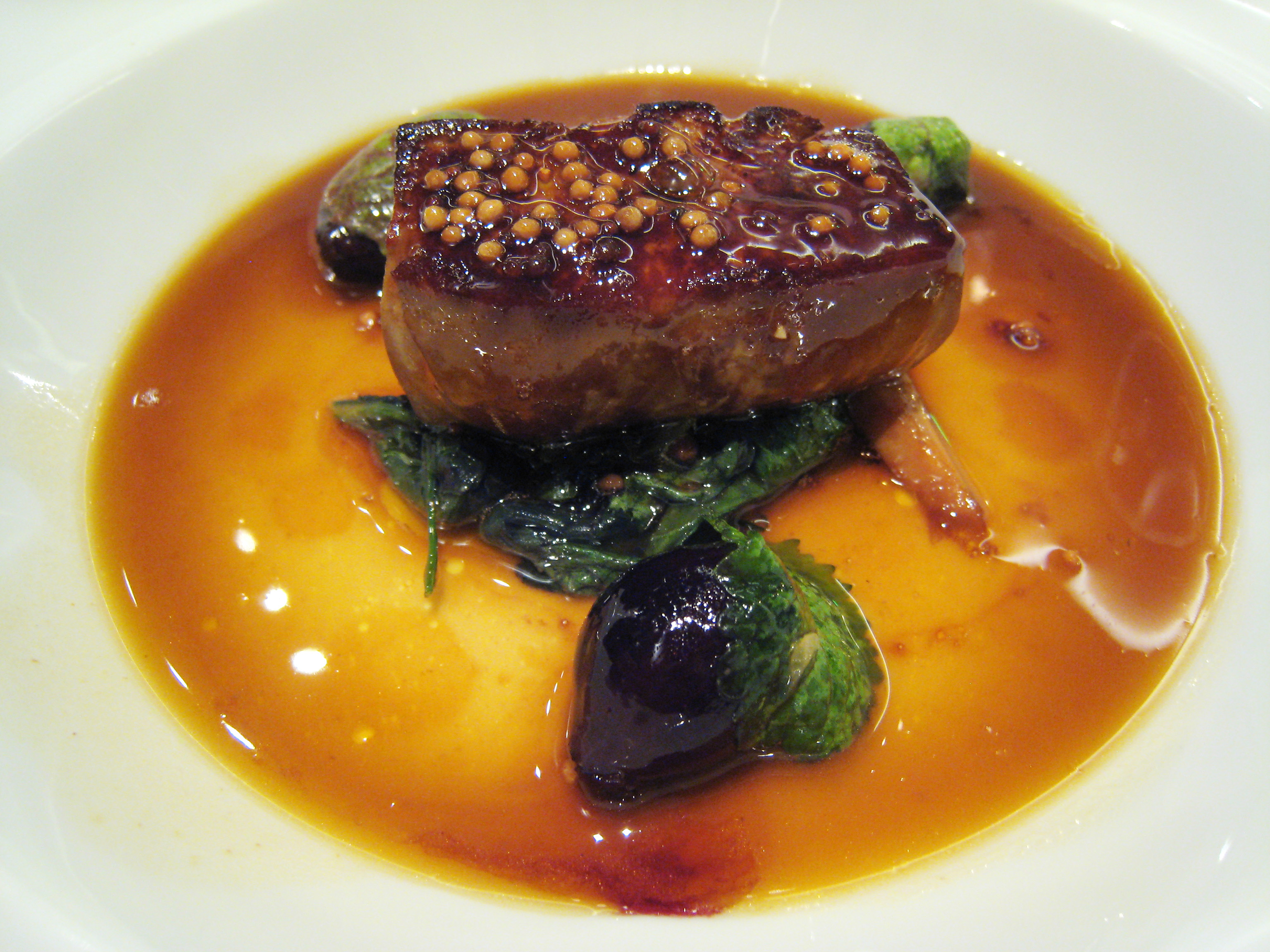
Foie gras

foie gras
fatty liver; usually the liver of overfed goose, hence: pâté de foie gras, pâté made from goose liver.
folie à deux
a simultaneous occurrence of delusions in two closely related people, often said of an unsuitable romance. In clinical psychology, the term is used to describe people who share schizophrenic delusions. The derived forms folie à trois, folie à quatre, folie en famille or even folie à plusieurs do not exist in French where "collective hysterics" is used.
force majeure
an overpowering and unforeseeable event, especially when talking about weather (often appears in insurance contracts).
forte
Lit. "strong point" (of a sword). Strength, expertise, one's strong point.
froideur
coldness (for behavior and manners only).

=== G ===
gaffe
blunder
garage
covered parking
garçon
lit. "boy" or "male servant"; sometimes used by English speakers to summon the attention of a male waiter (has a playful connotation in English but is condescending and possibly offensive in French).
gauche
lit. "left". Clumsy, tactless.
gaucherie
boorishness, clumsiness.

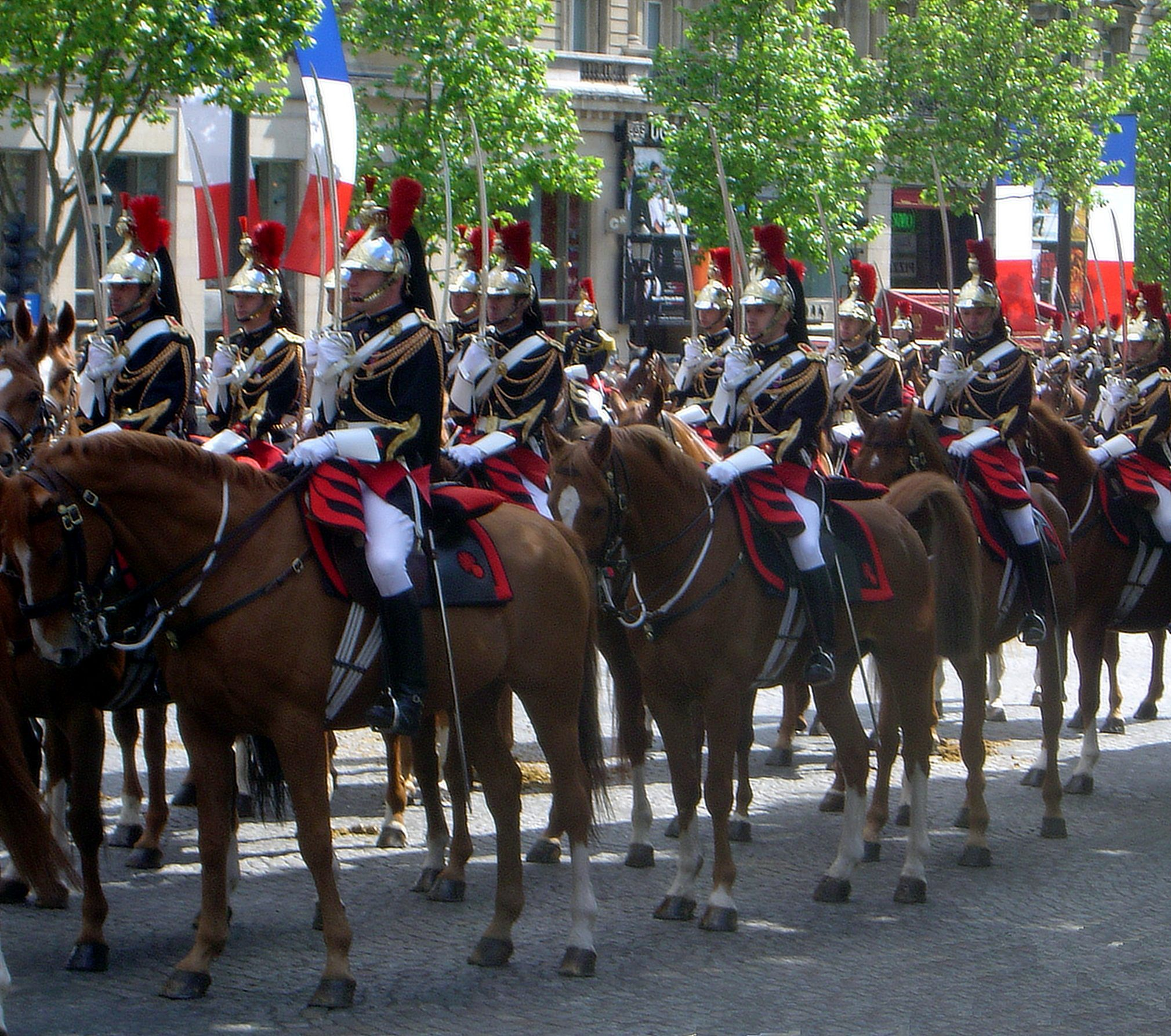
Gendarmes

gendarme
a member of the gendarmerie; colloquially, a policeman
gendarmerie
a military body charged with police duties
genre
a type or class, such as "the thriller genre".
gîte
furnished vacation cottage typically in rural France.
glissade
slide down a slope.

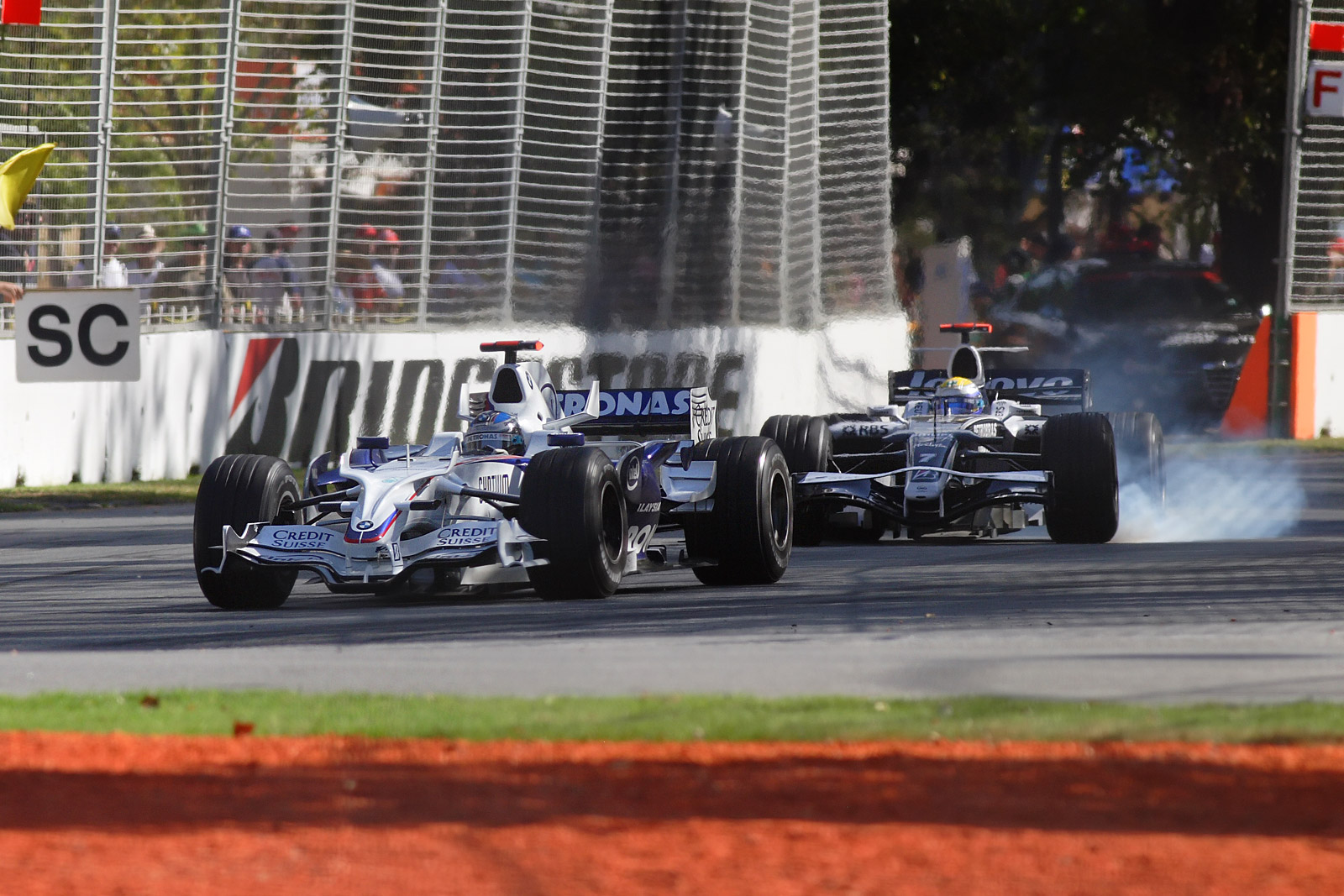
Grand Prix.

Grand Prix
lit. "Great Prize"; a type of motor racing. English plural is Grands Prix.
Grand Guignol
a horror show, named after a French theater famous for its frightening plays and bloody special effects. (Guignol can be used in French to describe a ridiculous person, in the same way that clown might be used in English.)

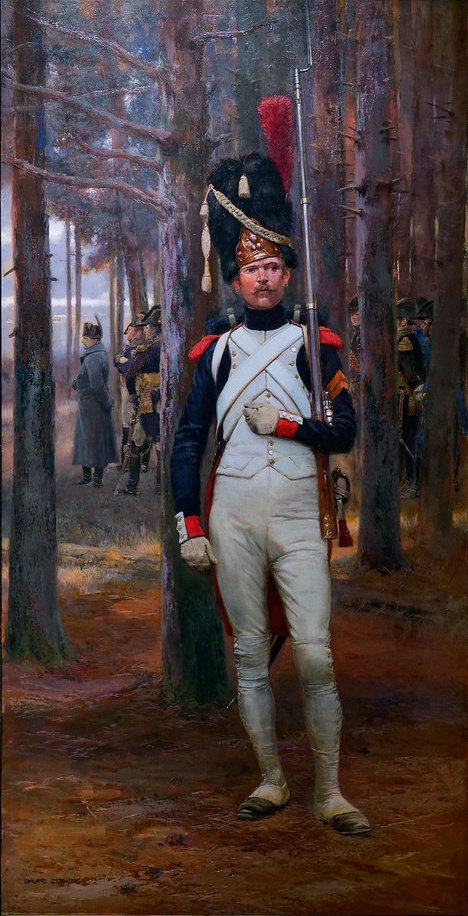
Grenadier

grenadier
a specialized soldier, first established for the throwing of grenades and later as elite troops.

=== H ===
habitué
one who regularly frequents a place.

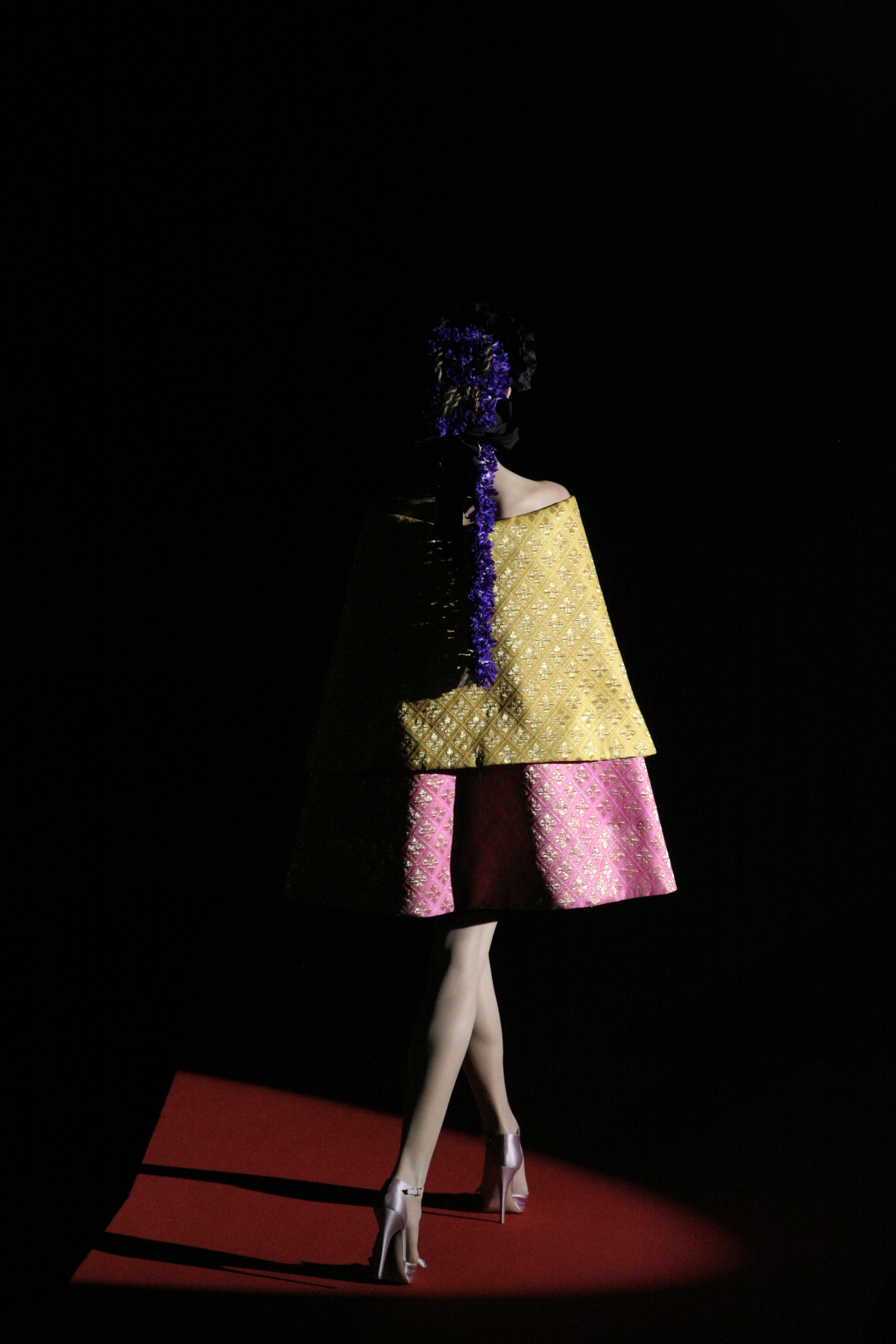
Haute couture

haute couture
lit. "high sewing": Paris-based custom-fitted clothing; trend-setting fashion
haute école
lit. "high school": advanced components of Classical dressage (horseback riding); when capitalized (Haute Ecole), refers to France's most prestigious higher education institutions (e.g., Polytechnique, ENA, Les Mines)
hauteur
lit. "height": arrogance.
haut monde
lit. the "high world": fashionable society.
Honi soit qui mal y pense
"Shamed be he who thinks ill of it"; or sometimes translated as "Evil be to him who evil thinks"; the motto of the English Order of the Garter (modern French writes honni instead of Old French honi and would phrase "qui en pense du mal" instead of "qui mal y pense"). The sentence Honni soit qui mal y pense (often with double n) can still be used in French as a frozen expression to mean "Let nobody think ill of this" by allusion to the Garter's motto. A more colloquial quasi-synonymous expression in French would be en tout bien tout honneur.
hors de combat
lit. "out of the fight": prevented from fighting or participating in some event, usually by injury.
hors concours
lit. "out of competition": not to be judged with others because of the superiority of the work to the others.
hors d'œuvre
lit. "outside the [main] work": appetizer.

=== I ===
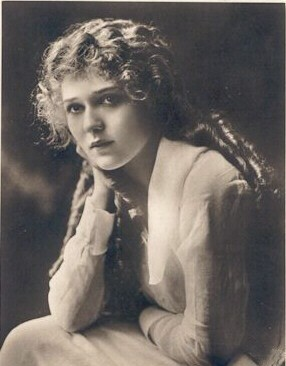
Ingénue

idée fixe
lit. "fixed idea": obsession; in music, a leitmotiv.
impasse
a situation offering no escape, as a difficulty without solution, an argument where no agreement is possible, etc.; a deadlock.
ingénu(e)
an innocent young man/woman, used particularly in reference to a theatrical stock character who is entirely virginal and wholesome. L'Ingénu is a famous novella written by Voltaire.

=== J ===
j'accuse
"I accuse"; used generally in reference to a political or social indictment (alluding to J'Accuse…!, Émile Zola's exposé of the Dreyfus affair, a political scandal that divided France from the 1890s to the early 1900s (decade) and involved the false conviction for treason in 1894 of Alfred Dreyfus, a young French artillery officer of Jewish background).
j'adoube
In chess, an expression, said discreetly, that signals the intention to straighten the pieces without committing to move or capturing the first one touched as per the game's rules; lit. "I adjust", from adouber, to dub (the action of knighting someone).
je ne regrette rien
"I regret nothing" (from the title of a popular song sung by Édith Piaf: Non, je ne regrette rien). Also the phrase the UK's then Chancellor of the Exchequer Norman Lamont chose to use to describe his feelings over the events of September 16, 1992 ('Black Wednesday').
je ne sais quoi
lit. "I-don't-know-what": an indescribable or indefinable 'something' that distinguishes the object in question from others that are superficially similar.
jeu d'esprit
lit. "play of spirit": a witty, often light-hearted, comment or composition
jeunesse dorée
lit. "gilded youth"; name given to a body of young dandies, also called the Muscadins, who, after the fall of Robespierre, fought against the Jacobins. Today used for youthful offspring, particularly if bullying and vandalistic, of the affluent.
joie de vivre
"joy of life/living".

=== L ===
l'appel du vide
lit. "call of the void"; used to refer to intellectual suicidal thoughts, or the urge to engage in self-destructive (suicidal) behaviors during everyday life. Examples include thinking about swerving in to the opposite lane while driving, or feeling the urge to jump off a cliff edge while standing on it. These thoughts are not accompanied by emotional distress.
laissez-faire
lit. "let do"; often used within the context of economic policy or political philosophy, meaning leaving alone, or non-interference. The phrase is the shortcut of Laissez faire, laissez passer, a doctrine first supported by the Physiocrats in the 18th century. The motto was invented by Vincent de Gournay, and it became popular among supporters of free trade and economic liberalism. It is also used to describe a parental style in developmental psychology, where the parent(s) does not apply rules or guiding. As per the parental style, it is now one of the major management styles. Used more generally in modern English to describe a particularly casual or "hands-off" attitude or approach to something,
laissez-passer
a travel document, a passport
laissez les bons temps rouler
Cajun expression for "let the good times roll": not used in proper French, and not generally understood by Francophones outside Louisiana, who would say profitez des bons moments (enjoy the good moments).
lamé
a type of fabric woven or knit with metallic yarns.
lanterne rouge
the last-place finisher in a cycling stage race; most commonly used in connection with the Tour de France.
lèse majesté
an offense against a sovereign power; or, an attack against someone's dignity or against a custom or institution held sacred (from the Latin crimen laesae maiestatis: the crime of injured majesty).
liaison
a close relationship or connection; an affair. The French meaning is broader; liaison also means "bond"' such as in une liaison chimique (a chemical bond)
lingerie
a type of female underwear.
littérateur
an intellectual (can be pejorative in French, meaning someone who writes a lot but does not have a particular skill).
louche
of questionable taste, but also someone or something that arouses somebody's suspicions.
Louis Quatorze
"Louis XIV" (of France), the Sun King, usually a reference to décor or furniture design.
Louis Quinze
"Louis XV" (of France), associated with the rococo style of furniture, architecture and interior decoration.

=== M ===
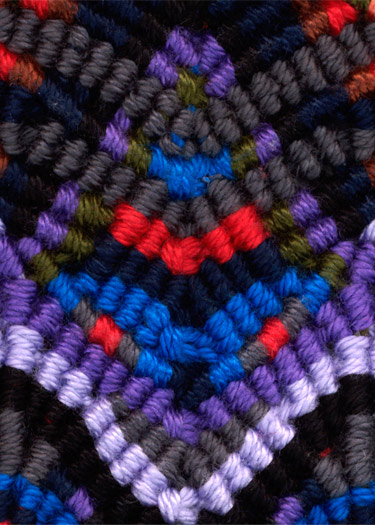
Macramé

macramé
coarse lace work made with knotted cords.
madame
a woman brothel-keeper. In French, a title of respect for an older or married woman (literally "my lady"); sometimes spelled "madam" in English (but never in French).
mademoiselle
lit. "my noble young lady": young unmarried lady, miss.
malaise
a general sense of depression or unease. Can also be used to denote complacency, or lethargy towards something.

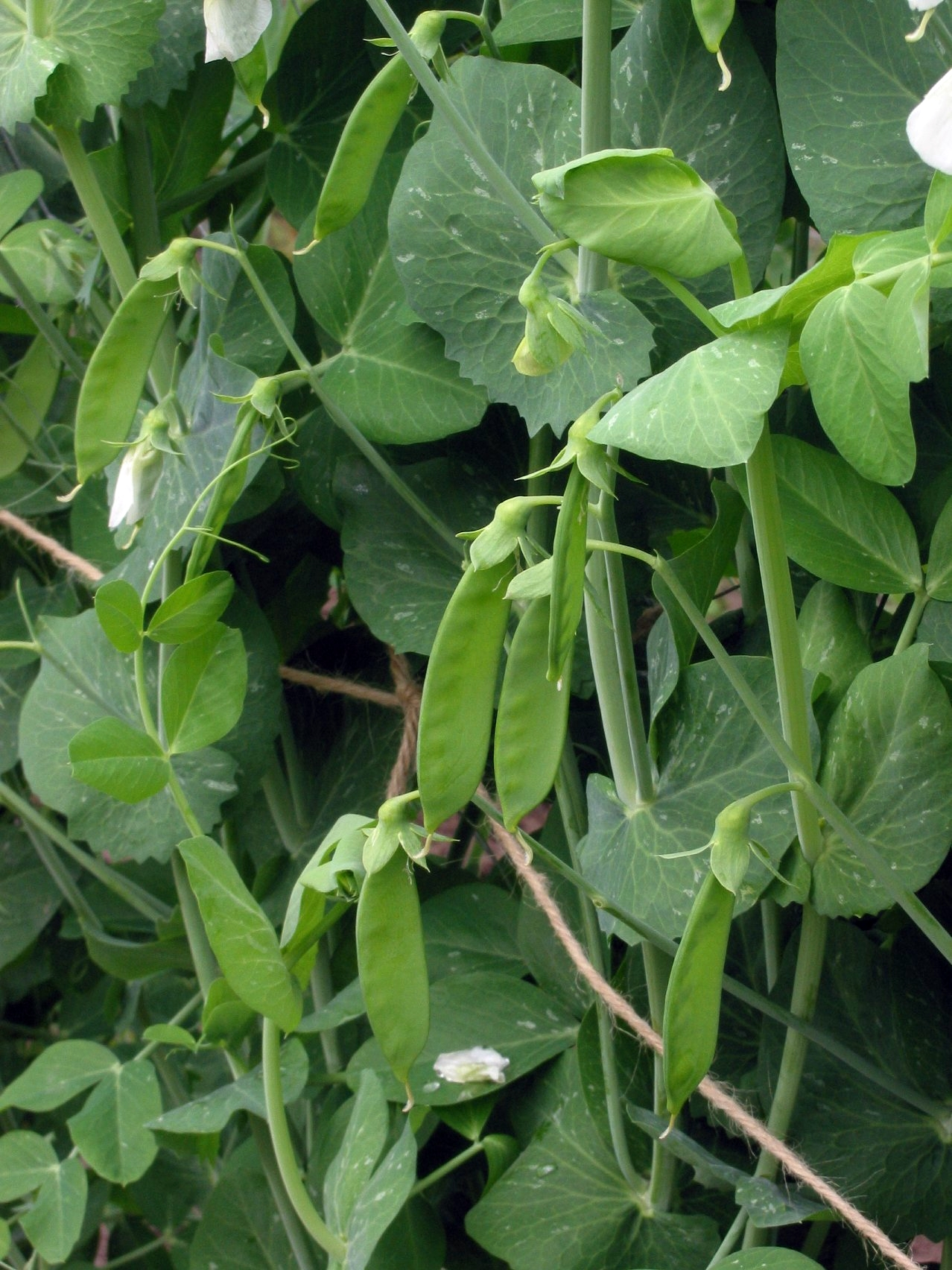
Mange tout

mange tout
a phrase describing snow peas and snap peas (lit. 'eat-all' because these peas can be cooked and eaten with their pod).
manqué
unfulfilled; failed.

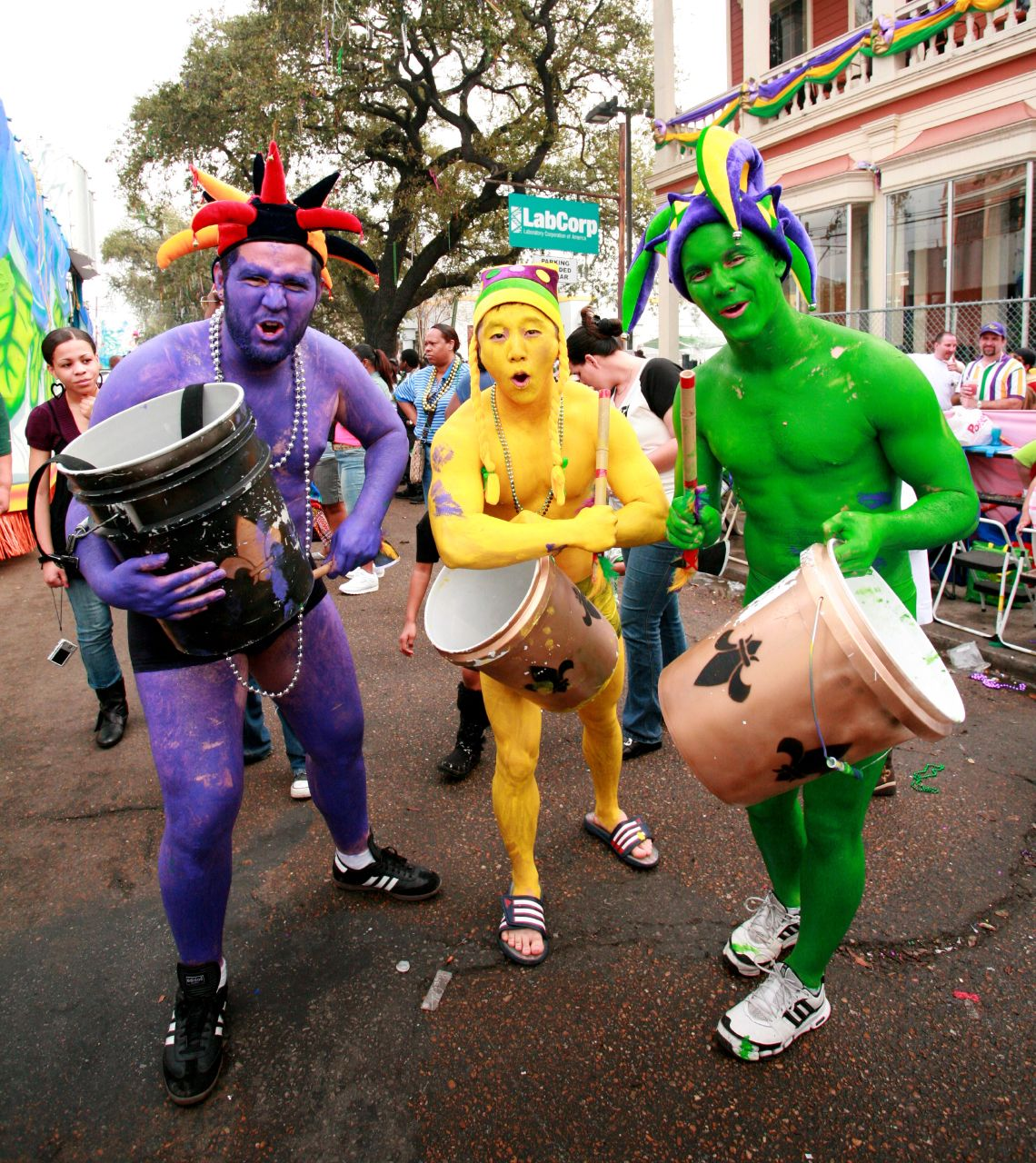
Mardi Gras

Mardi Gras
Fat Tuesday or Shrove Tuesday, the last day of eating meat, eggs and fatty foods before Lent.
marque
a model or brand.
matériel
supplies and equipment, particularly in a military context (French meaning is broader and corresponds more to "hardware")
mauvais quart d'heure
lit. "bad quarter hour": a short unpleasant or uncomfortable moment.
mdr
Alt., MDR. Abbreviation in SMS, akin to LOL; for mort de rire (mort, adj. or verb, past tense), or mourir de rire (mourir, verb, infinitive). Lit., as adjective or past tense, dead or died of laughing, so "died laughing" or "dying of laughter"; compare mort de faim for starve.
mélange
a mixture.
mêlée
a confused fight; a struggling crowd. In French also: a rugby scrum.
ménage à trois
lit. "household for three": a sexual arrangement between three people.
ménagerie
a collection of wild animals kept in captivity for exhibition.
métier
a field of work or other activity; usually one in which one has special ability or training.
milieu
social environment; setting (has also the meaning of "middle", and organized crime community in French).
milieu intérieur
the extra-cellular fluid environment, and its physiological capacity to ensure protective stability for the tissues and organs of multicellular living organisms.
mirepoix
a cooking mixture of two parts onions and one part each of celery and carrots.
mise en place
an assembly of ingredients, usually set up in small bowls, used to facilitate cooking. This means all the raw ingredients are prepared and ready to go before cooking. Translated, "put in place."
mise en abyme
lit. "placed into abyss": a literary and artistic technique where a work contains a smaller copy of itself, creating a potentially infinite recursive loop. The term can describe a story within a story, a play within a play, or any self-referential artistic device.
mise en scène
the process of setting a stage with regard to placement of actors, scenery, properties, etc.; the stage setting or scenery of a play; surroundings, environment.
mise en table
table setting.
montage
editing.
le mot juste
lit. "the just word"; the right word at the right time. French uses it often in the expression chercher le mot juste (to search for the right word).
motif
a recurrent thematic element.
moue
a type of facial expression; pursing together of the lips to indicate dissatisfaction, a pout. See snout reflex.
mousse
a whipped dessert or a hairstyling foam; in French, however, it refers to any type of foam or moss.

=== N ===
naïveté
Lack of sophistication, experience, judgement, or worldliness; artlessness; gullibility; credulity.
né, née
lit. "born": a man's/woman's birth name (maiden name for a woman), e.g., "Martha Washington, née Dandridge."
n'est-ce pas?
"isn't it [true]?"
asked rhetorically after a statement, as in "Right?".
noblesse oblige
"nobility obliges"
those granted a higher station in life have a duty to extend (possibly token) favours/courtesies to those in lower stations.
nom de guerre
pseudonym to disguise the identity of a leader of a militant group, literally "war name", used in France for "pseudonym".
nom de plume
a "back-translation" from the English "pen name": author's pseudonym.
Although now used in French as well, the term was coined in English by analogy with nom de guerre.
nonpareil
Unequalled, unrivalled; unparalleled; unique
the modern French equivalent of this expression is sans pareil (literally "without equal").
nouveau (pl. nouveaux; fem. nouvelle; fem. pl. nouvelles)
new.
nouveau riche
lit. "newly rich"
used to refer particularly to those living a garish lifestyle with their newfound wealth; see also arriviste and parvenu.
nouvelle vague
lit. "new wave."
Used for stating a new way or a new trend of something. Originally marked a new style of French filmmaking in the late 1950s and early 1960s, reacting against films seen as too literary.

=== O ===
objet d'art
a work of art, commonly a painting or sculpture; also a utilitarian object displayed for its aesthetic qualities
œuvre
"work", in the sense of an artist's work; by extension, an artist's entire body of work.
opéra bouffe
musical comedy, satire, parody or farce.
oubliette
"little forgotten place": a type of dungeon accessible only from a hatch or hole in a high ceiling, making escape nearly impossible.
outré
exceeding the lines of propriety; eccentric in behavior or appearance in an inappropriate way

=== P ===
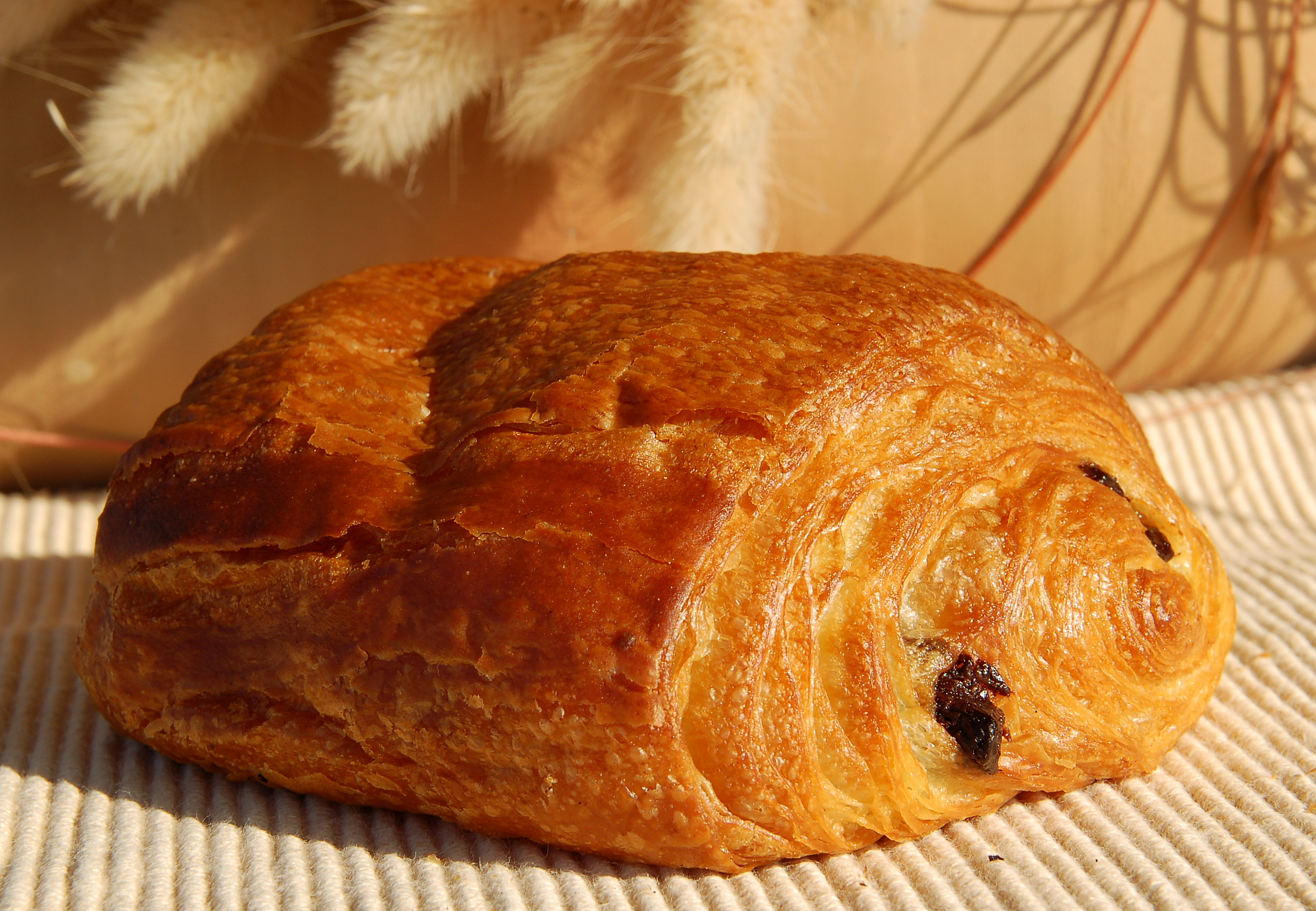
Pain au chocolat

pain au chocolat
lit. "bread with chocolate." Despite the name, it is not made of bread but puff pastry with chocolate inside. The term chocolatine is used in some Francophone areas (especially the South-West) and sometimes in English.
pain aux raisins
raisin bread.
panache
verve; flamboyance.
papier-mâché
lit. "chewed paper"; a craft medium using paper and paste.
par avion
by aircraft. In English, specifically by air mail, from the phrase found on air mail envelopes.
par excellence
better than all the others, quintessential.
parc fermé
lit. "closed park". A secure area at a Grand Prix circuit where the cars may be stored overnight.

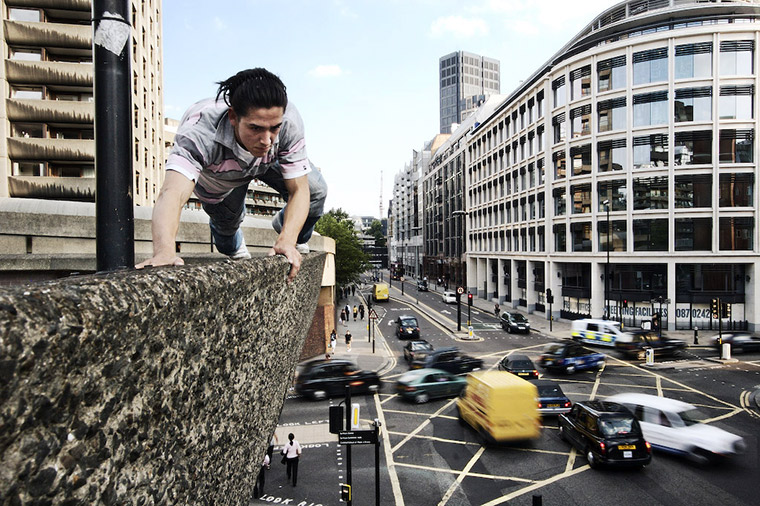
Parkour

parkour
urban street sport involving climbing and leaping, using buildings, walls, curbs to ricochet off much as if one were on a skateboard, often in follow-the-leader style. Originally a phonetic form of the French word parcours, which means "a run, a route" Also known as, or the predecessor to, "free running", developed by Sébastien Foucan.
parole
1) (in linguistics) speech, more specifically the individual, personal phenomenon of language; see langue and parole. 2) (in criminal justice) conditional early release from prison; see parole.
parvenu
a social upstart.
pas de deux
lit. "step for two"; in ballet, a dance or figure for two performers, a duet; also a close relationship between two people.
pas de trois
lit. "step for three"; in ballet, a dance or figure for three performers.
passe-partout
a document or key that allows the holder to travel without hindrance from the authorities or enter any location.
pastiche
a derivative work; an imitation.
patois
a dialect; jargon.
peloton
in road cycling, the main group of riders in a race.

penchant

inclination; decided taste; bias. "a penchant for art".

père
lit. "father", used after a man's surname to distinguish a father from a son, as in Alexandre Dumas, père.
petit pois
small peas, often sold in the frozen food aisle.
petite bourgeoisie
often anglicised as "petty bourgeoisie", used to designate the middle class.
la petite mort
lit. "the little death"; an expression for the weakening or loss of consciousness following an intense orgasm.
Pied-Noir (plural Pieds-Noirs)
lit. "black foot", a European Algerian in the pre-independence state.
pied-à-terre (also pied à terre)
lit. "foot-on-the-ground"; a place to stay, generally small and applied to a secondary residence in a city.

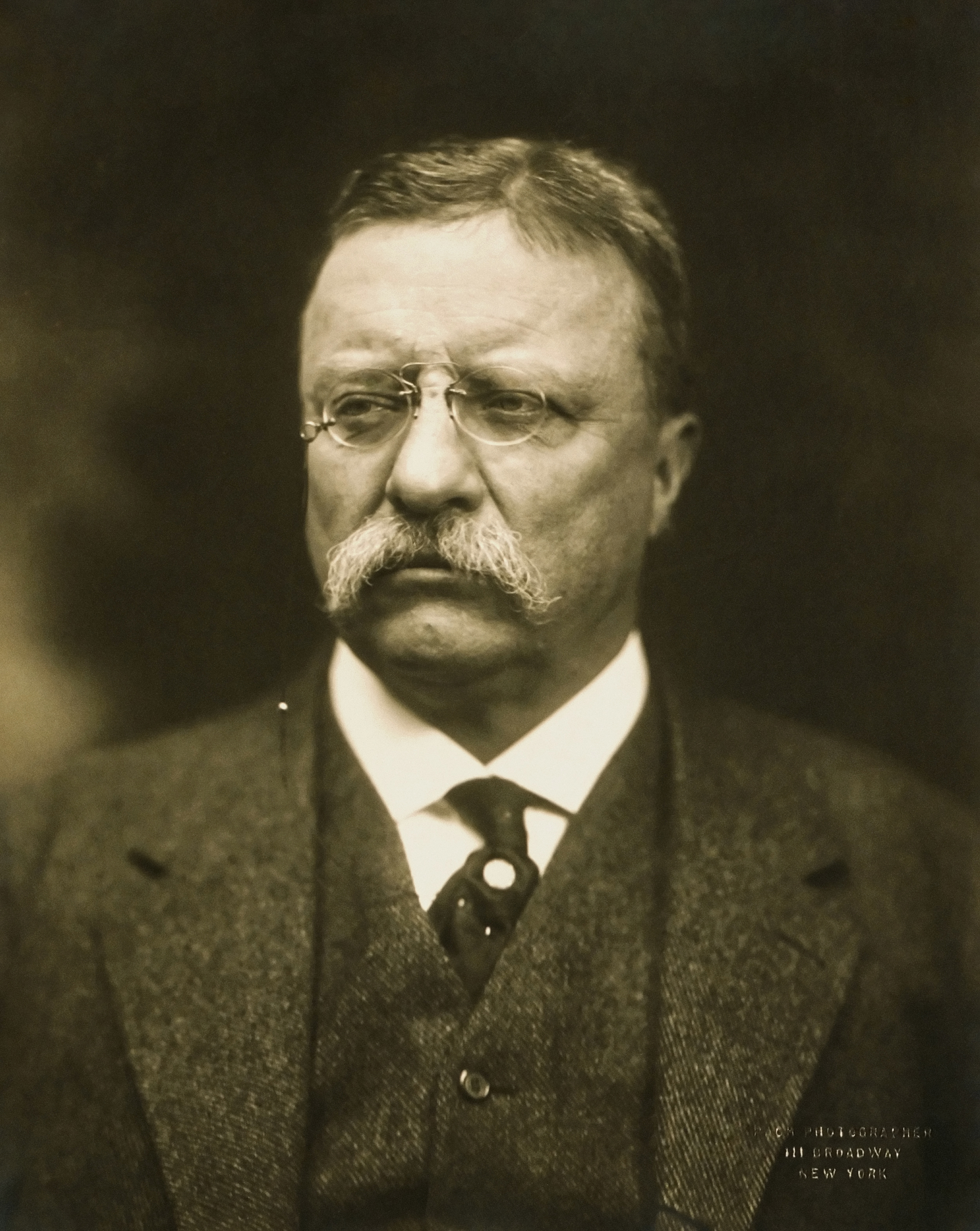
Pince-nez

pince-nez
lit. "nose-pincher", a type of spectacles without temple arms.
piste
lit. "trail" or "track"; often used referring to skiing at a ski area (on piste) versus skiing in the back country (off piste).
plage
beach, especially a fashionable seaside resort.
plat du jour
lit. "dish of the day"; a dish served in a restaurant on a particular day but separate from the regular menu.
plongeur (fem. plongeuse)
a male (or female) dishwasher in a professional kitchen.
plus ça change, plus c'est la même chose (or plus ça change, plus c'est pareil) (often abbreviated to just plus ça change)
the more things change, the more they stay the same. An aphorism coined by Jean-Baptiste Alphonse Karr.
point d'appui
a location where troops assemble prior to a battle. While this figurative meaning also exists in French, the first and literal meaning of point d'appui is a fixed point from which a person or thing executes a movement (such as a footing in climbing or a pivot).
porte-cochère
an architectural term referring to a doorway, sometimes ornate, intended for the passage of vehicles. Literally a "coach door". Written in French without the hyphen : porte cochère
poseur
lit. "poser": a person who pretends to be something he is not; an affected or insincere person; a wannabe.
pot-au-feu
stew, soup.
pour encourager les autres
lit. "to encourage others"; said of an excessive punishment meted out as an example, to deter others. The original is from Voltaire's Candide and referred to the execution of Admiral John Byng.
pourboire
lit. "for drink"; gratuity, tip; donner un pourboire: to tip.
prairie
lit. "meadow"; expansive natural meadows of long grass.
prêt-à-porter
lit. "ready to wear"; clothing off the shelf, in contrast to haute couture.
prie-dieu
lit. "pray [to] God"; a type of prayer desk.
prix fixe
lit. "fixed price"; a menu on which multi-course meals with only a few choices are charged at a fixed price.
protégé (fem. protégée)
lit. "protected"; a man/woman who receives support from an influential mentor.
provocateur
an agitator, a polemicist.
purée
lit. a smooth, creamy substance made of liquidized or crushed fruit or vegetables.

=== R ===
raconteur
a storyteller.
raison d'être
"reason for being": justification or purpose of existence.
rapprochement
the establishment of cordial relations, often used in diplomacy.
reconnaissance
scouting, the military exploration outside an area that friendly forces occupy
recueillement
lit. "gathering" or "collecting oneself"; a state of quiet contemplation, meditation, or introspective reflection; spiritual or mental withdrawal for the purpose of prayer, thought, or reverence.
refoulement
the expulsion of persons who have the right to be recognised as refugees.
Renaissance
a historical period or cultural movement of rebirth
reportage
reporting; journalism.
répondez s'il-vous-plaît. (RSVP)
Please reply. Though francophones may use more usually "prière de répondre" or "je vous prie de bien vouloir répondre", it is common enough.
restaurateur
a restaurant owner.
revenant
lit. "one who returns": a person who returns from a long absence or from the dead; a ghost or apparition of a deceased person that is believed to have returned from the grave to terrorize the living. From the French verb revenir (to return). In folklore and gothic literature, revenants are typically corporeal undead beings, distinct from ethereal spirits, who return with a specific purpose such as revenge or to complete unfinished business. The term has been adopted in modern English to describe anyone who returns after a prolonged absence, particularly in dramatic or unexpected circumstances.
Rive Gauche
the left (southern) bank (of the River Seine in Paris). A particular mindset attributed to inhabitants of that area, which includes the Sorbonne
roi fainéant
lit. "do-nothing king": an expression first used about the kings of France from 670 to 752 (Thierry III to Childeric III), who were puppets of their ministers. The term was later used about other royalty who had been made powerless, also in other countries, but lost its meaning when parliamentarism made all royals powerless.

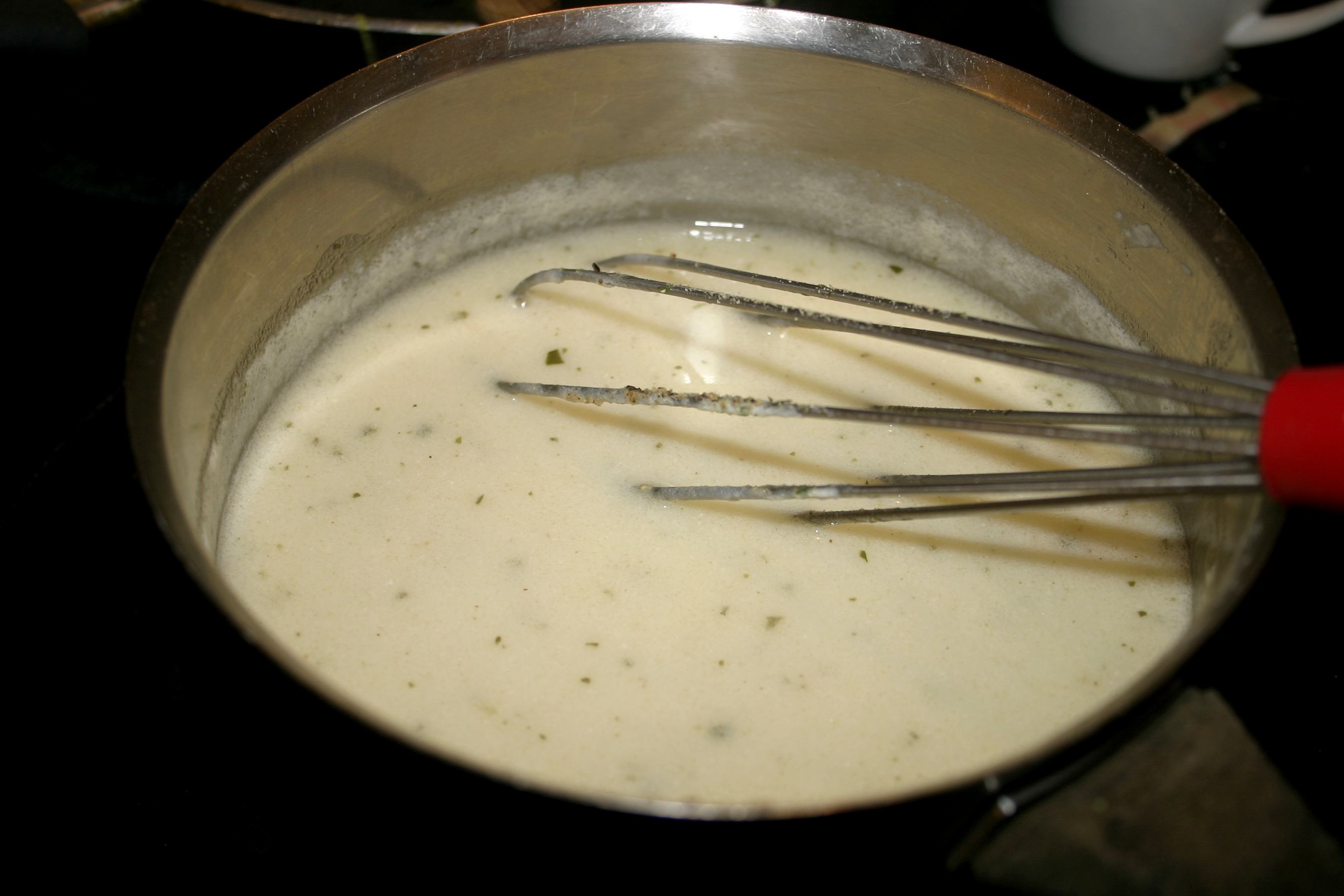
Roux

roman à clef
lit. "novel with a key": an account of actual persons, places or events in fictional guise.
roué
an openly debauched, lecherous older man.
roux
a cooked mixture of flour and melted butter (or other fat) used as a base in soups and gravies.

=== S ===
sacre bleu
lit. "sacred blue": a dated French minced oath originating from the blasphemous "sacre dieu!" ("Holy god!"). Meant as a cry of surprise or happiness.
French orthography is sacrebleu in one word.
sang-froid
lit. "cold blood": coolness and composure under strain; stiff upper lip. Also pejorative in the phrase meurtre de sang-froid ("cold-blooded murder").
sans
without.
sans-culottes
lit. "without knee-breeches", a name the insurgent crowd in the streets of Paris gave to itself during the French Revolution, because they usually wore pantaloons (full-length pants or trousers) instead of the chic knee-length culotte of the nobles. In modern use: holding strong republican views.
sauté
lit. "jumped", from the past participle of the verb sauter (to jump), which can be used as an adjective or a noun; quickly fried in a small amount of oil, stir-fried. ex: sauté of veau.
savant
lit. "knowing": a wise or learned person; in English, one exceptionally gifted in a narrow skill.
savoir-faire
lit. "know how to do"; to respond appropriately to any situation.
savoir-vivre
fact of following conventional norms within a society; etiquette (etiquette also comes from a French word, étiquette).
Serviette
A napkin; a square piece of cloth or paper used while eating for protecting the clothes or cleaning one's mouth and fingers.
sillage
lit. "wake" or "trail": the lingering scent trail left by perfume as someone passes by, or the degree to which a fragrance radiates from the wearer. From nautical terminology describing the track left by a ship moving through water. In perfumery, sillage is a key characteristic used to describe how a fragrance projects and how far it travels from the wearer's skin. By extension, the term can refer metaphorically to any lingering impression or influence that someone leaves behind after their departure, whether in conversation, art, or personal presence.
sobriquet
an assumed name, a nickname (often used in a pejorative way in French).
soi-disant
lit. "oneself saying"; so-called; self-described.
soigné
fashionable; polished.
soirée
an evening party.
sommelier
a wine steward.
soupçon
a very small amount. (In French, it can also mean "suspicion".)
soupe du jour
lit. "soup of the day", the particular kind of soup offered that day.
succès d'estime
lit. "success of esteem; critical success"; sometimes used pejoratively in English.

=== T ===
tableau
chalkboard. The meaning is broader in French: all types of board (chalkboard, whiteboard, notice board ...). Refers also to a painting (see tableau vivant, below) or a table (chart).

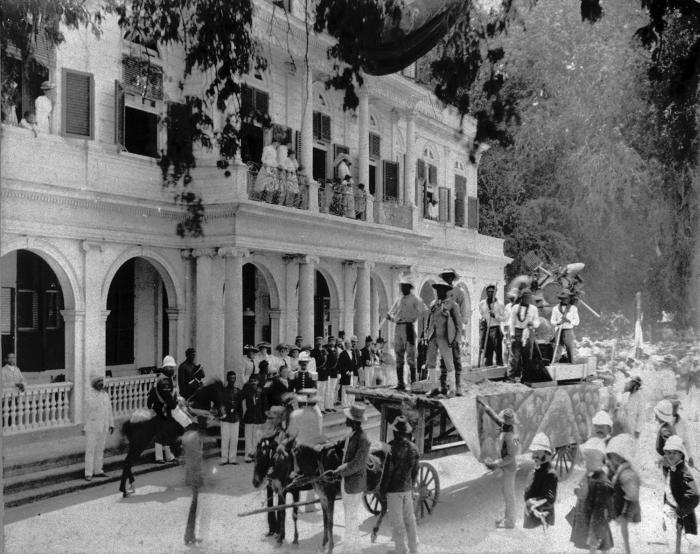
Tableau vivant

tableau vivant
lit. "living picture"; the term describes a striking group of suitably costumed actors or artist's models, carefully posed and often theatrically lit.
tenné
orange-brown, "rust" colour, not commonly used outside heraldic emblazoning.
tête-à-tête
lit. "head to head"; an intimate get-together or private conversation between two people.
toilette
the process of dressing or grooming. Also refers in French, when plural (les toilettes), to the toilet room.
torsades de pointes
lit. "twisting around a point", used to describe a particular type of heart rhythm.
touché
lit. "touched" or "hit!": acknowledgment of an effective counterpoint or verbal riposte; comes from terminology in the sport of fencing. In French has a broader meaning (touched) as "emotionally touched".
tour de force (also tour-de-force)
lit. "feat of strength": a masterly or brilliant stroke, creation, effect, or accomplishment.
tout court
lit. "all short": typically used in philosophy to mean "nothing else", in contrast to a more detailed or extravagant alternative. For instance, "Kant does not believe that morality derives from practical reason as applied to moral ends, but from practical reason tout court".
tout de suite
right now, immediately. Often mangled as "toot sweet".
tranche
lit. "slice": one of several different classes of securities involved a single financial transaction.
triage
during a medical emergency or disaster, the process of determining the priority of medical treatment or transportation based on the severity of the patient's condition. In recent years, in British English usage, the term has also been used in the sense of to screen or address something at the point of contact, before it requires escalation.
tricoteuse
a woman who knits and gossips; from the women who knitted and sewed while watching executions of prisoners of the French Revolution.
trompe-l'œil
lit. "trick the eye"; photographic realism in fine-art painting or decorative painting in a home.

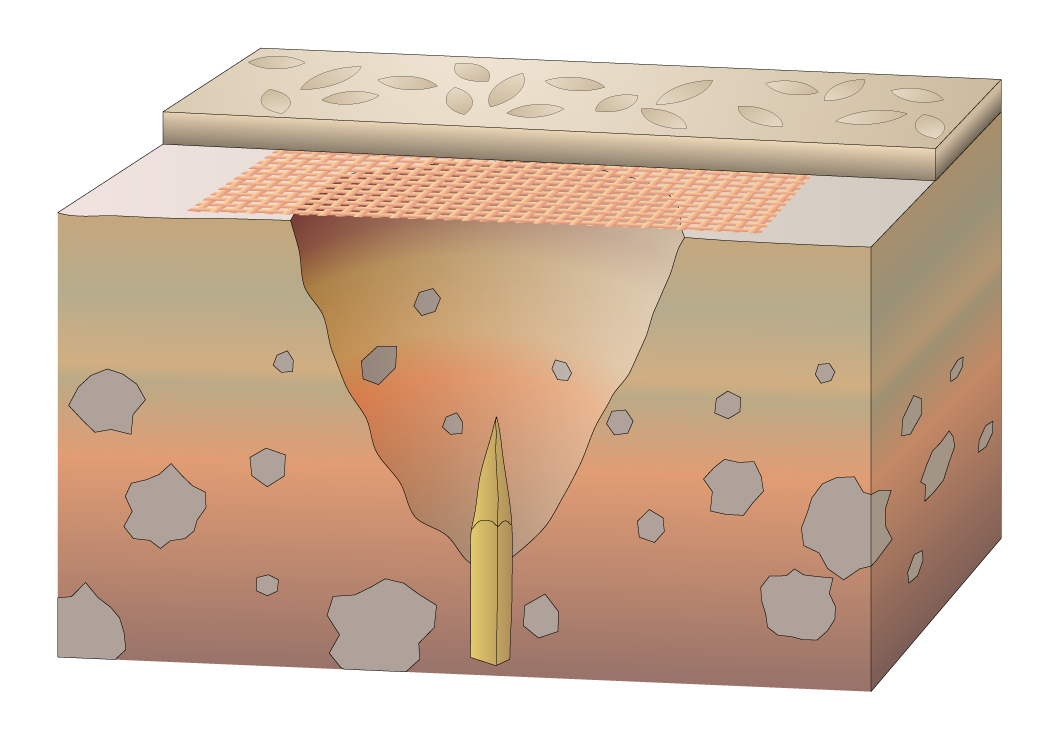
Trou de loup

trou de loup
lit. "wolf hole"; a kind of booby trap.
trousseau

1. The wardrobe of a bride, including the wedding dress or similar clothing, or the bride's belongings
2. A dowry
3. A hope chest, glory box or its contents

=== V ===
va-et-vient
lit. "goes and comes"; the continual coming and going of people to and from a place.
venu(e)
an invited man/woman for a show, or "one who has come"; the term is unused in modern French, though it can still be heard in a few expressions like bienvenu/e (literally "well come": welcome) or le premier venu (anyone; literally, "the first who came"). Almost exclusively used in modern English as a noun meaning the location where a meeting or event is taking place.
vignette
generally, a decorative border in architecture, print and photography
vin de pays
lit. "country wine"; wine of a lower designated quality than appellation contrôlée.

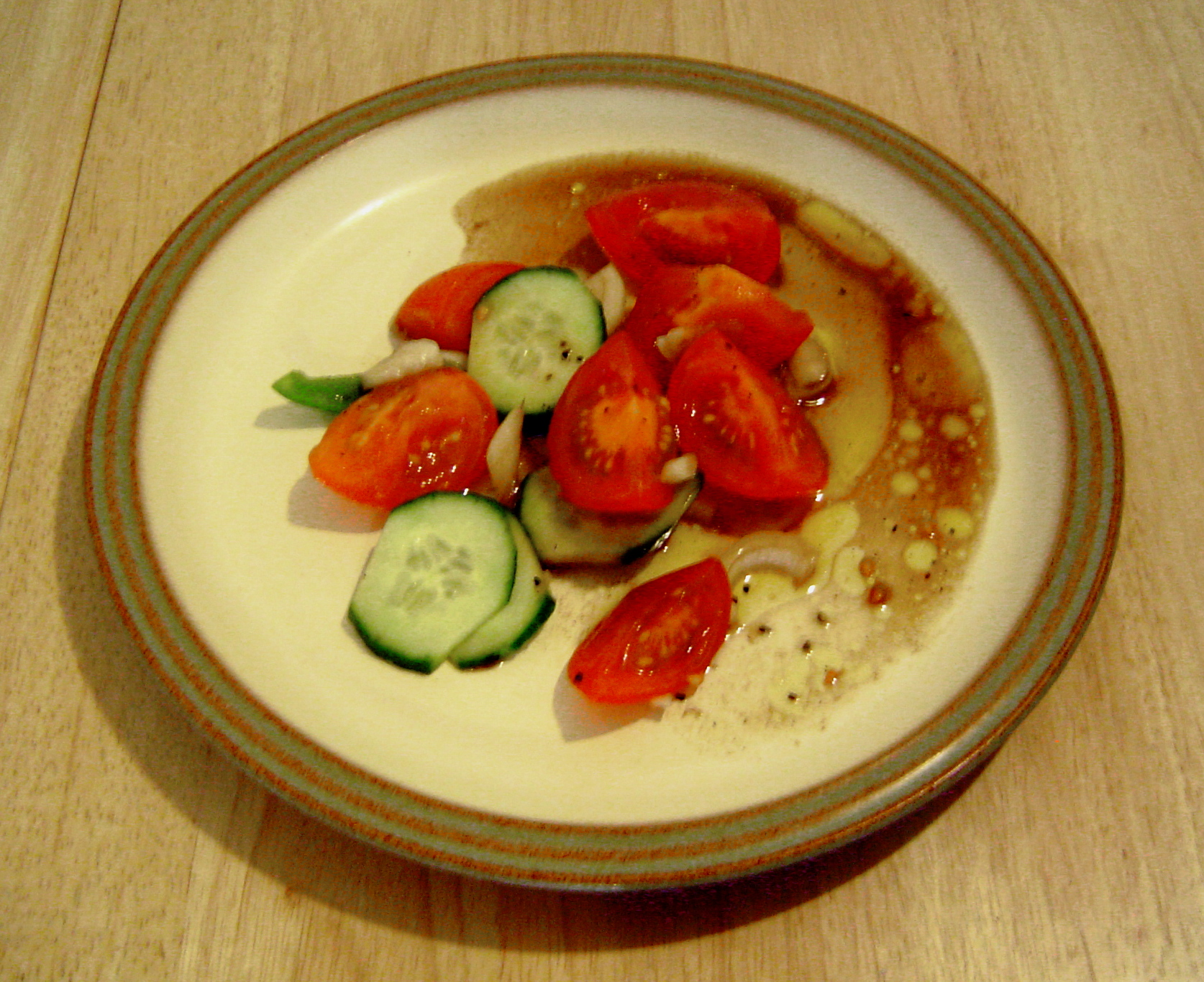
Salad with vinaigrette dressing

vinaigrette
diminutive of vinaigre (vinegar): salad dressing of oil and vinegar.
vis-à-vis (also vis-a-vis)
lit. "face to face [with]": in comparison with or in relation to; opposed to. From vis, an obsolete word for "face", replaced by visage in contemporary French.
vive [...]!
"Long live ...!"; lit. "Live"; as in "Vive la France !", Vive la République !, Vive la Résistance !, Vive le Canada !, or Vive le Québec libre ! (long live free Quebec, a sovereigntist slogan famously used by French President Charles de Gaulle in 1967 in Montreal). Unlike viva (Italian and Spanish) or vivat (Latin), it cannot be used alone; it needs a complement.
vive la différence!
lit. "[long] live the difference"; originally referring to the difference between the sexes; the phrase may be also used to celebrate the difference between any two groups of people (or simply the general diversity of individuals).
voilà !
lit. "see there"; in French it can mean simply "there it is"; in English it is generally restricted to a triumphant revelation.
volte-face
frenchified form of Italian volta faccia, lit. "turn face", an about-face, a maneuver in marching; figuratively, a complete reversal of opinion or position.
voulez-vous coucher avec moi (ce soir)?
"Do you want to sleep with me (tonight)?" or more appropriately, "Will you spend the night with me?" In French, coucher is vulgar in this sense. In English it appears in Tennessee Williams's play A Streetcar Named Desire, as well as in the lyrics of a popular song by Labelle, "Lady Marmalade."
voyeur
lit. "someone who sees"; a Peeping Tom.

=== Z ===
zut alors!
"Darn it!" or the British expression "Blimey!" This is a general exclamation (vulgar equivalent is merde alors ! "Shit, then!"). Just plain zut is also in use, often repeated for effect: zut, zut et zut ! There is an album by Frank Zappa, punningly titled Zoot Allures. The phrase is also used on the Saturday Night Live Weekend Update sketch by recurring character Jean K. Jean, played by Kenan Thompson as well as by John Goodman's Dan Conner in an episode of Roseanne when Roseanne dresses up in a sexy outfit and has a boudoir photo taken of her as a birthday gift for her husband.

== Not used as such in French ==
Through the evolution of the language, many words and phrases are no longer used in modern French. Also there are expressions that, even though grammatically correct, do not have the same meaning in French as the English words derived from them. Some older word usages still appear in Quebec French.

à la mode
fashionable; in the US it also describes a dessert with ice cream (as in "apple pie à la mode") or, in some US regions, with cheese. In French, it mainly means "fashionable", "trendy", but is occasionally a culinary term usually meaning something cooked with carrots and onions (as in bœuf à la mode). It can also mean "in the style or manner [of]" (as in tripes à la mode de Caen), and in this acceptation is similar to the shorter expression "à la". The British English meaning and usage is the same as in French.
accoutrement
personal military or fighting armaments worn about one's self; has come to mean the accompanying items available to pursue a mission, or just accessories in general. In French, means a funny or ridiculous clothing; often a weird disguise or a getup, though it can be said also for people with bad taste in clothing.
appliqué
an inlaid or attached decorative feature. Lit. "applied", though this meaning does not exist as such in French. However "appliqué inversé" exists and has the same meaning as a reverse appliqué. Also an "applique murale" is a decorative light fixture attached on a wall.
après-ski
lit. "after skiing", socializing after a ski session; in French, this word refers to boots used to walk in snow (e.g. MoonBoots). Commonly used for the same thing as in English in Quebec.
arrêt à bon temps
A counterattack that attempts to take advantage of an uncertain attack in fencing. Though grammatically correct, this expression is not used in French. The term arrêt exists in fencing, with the meaning of a "simple counteroffensive action"; the general meaning is "a stop". A related French expression: s'arrêter à temps (to stop in time).
artiste
a skilled performer, a person with artistic pretensions. In French: an artist. Can be used ironically for a person demonstrating little professional skill or passion in both languages.
au naturel
nude; in French, literally, in a natural manner or way (au is the contraction of à le, masculine form of à la). It means "in an unaltered way" and can be used either for people or things. For people, it rather refers to a person who does not use make-up or artificial manners (un entretien au naturel = a backstage interview). For things, it means that they have not been altered. Often used in cooking, like thon au naturel: canned tuna without any spices or oil. Also in heraldry, meaning "in natural colours", especially flesh colour, which is not one of the "standard" colours of heraldry.
auteur
A film director, specifically one who controls most aspects of a film, or other controller of an artistic situation. The English connotation derives from French film theory. It was popularized in the journal Cahiers du cinéma: auteur theory maintains that directors like Hitchcock exert a level of creative control equivalent to the author of a literary work. In French, the word means "author", but some expressions like cinéma d'auteur are also in use.
bête noire
a scary or unpopular person, idea, or thing, or the archetypal scary monster in a story; literally "black beast." In French, être la bête noire de quelqu'un ("to be somebody's black beast") means that one is particularly hated by this person or this person has a strong aversion against them, regardless of whether they are scary or not. The dictionary of the Académie française admits its use only for people, though other dictionaries admit it for things or ideas too. It also means that one is repeatedly defeated by a person, who is thus considered their archenemy (for instance, "Nadal is the bête noire of Roger Federer").
boutique
a clothing store, usually selling designer/one off pieces rather than mass-produced clothes. Can also describe a quirky and/or upmarket hotel. In French, it can describe any shop, clothing or otherwise. The expression hôtel-boutique can be used to refer to upmarket hotels, but the word is recent and not as widespread as the equivalent expression boutique hotel.
boutonnière
In English, a boutonnière is a flower placed in the buttonhole of a suit jacket. In French, a boutonnière is the buttonhole itself. Yet the French expression "Une fleur à la boutonnière" has an equivalent meaning.
c'est magnifique, mais ce n'est pas la guerre
"it is magnificent, but it is not war" — quotation from Marshal Pierre Bosquet commenting on the charge of the Light Brigade. Unknown quotation in French.
cause célèbre
An issue arousing widespread controversy or heated public debate, lit. 'famous cause'. It is correct grammatically, but the expression is not used in French.
chacun à son goût
"each to his own taste," i.e. de gustibus non est disputandum or "there's no accounting for tastes." The French phrase was popularized by its use in the aria "Ich lade gern mir Gäste ein" from Johann Strauss's operetta Die Fledermaus (1874). The correct expressions in French would be chacun ses goûts / à chacun ses goûts / à chacun son goût: "to each his/her own taste(s)."
chanson
a classical "art song", equiv. to the German Lied or the Italian aria; or, in Russian, a cabaret-style sung narrative, usually rendered by a guttural male voice with guitar accompaniment. In French, it can be used to refer to any song, but it also refers to the same music genre as in English (someone practicing this genre being generally called a chansonnier in Quebec, especially if they sing at a restaurant or cabaret).
château
a manor house or a country house of nobility or gentry, with or without fortifications, originally—and still most frequently—in French-speaking regions. The word château is also used for castles in French, so where clarification is needed, the term château fort ("strong castle") is used to describe a castle.
chef
in English, a person who cooks professionally for other people. In French the word means "head" or "chief"; a professional cook is a cuisinier (lit. 'cook'), chef-cuisinier referring to a head cook. Also, sous-chef, the second-in-command, directly under the head chef. Traditionally, chef meant the head, for example a "couvre-chef" is a headgear, but by extension it's often used in job titles, military ranks, for a person in charge or who leads a group of people: "chef d'État" (lit. 'Head of State' or 'Chief of State'), "chef d'entreprise" ("Business executive"), "chef d'orchestre" (Conductor of an Orchestra), "sergeant-chef" (Staff Sergeant), "chef de gare" (stationmaster), "chef de famille" (head of household), etc. More casually in a work context, a chef is a boss.
cinq à sept
extraconjugal affair between five and seven pm. In French, though it can also mean this, it primarily means any relaxing time with friends between the end of work and the beginning of the marital obligations. In Quebec French, it is also used as a synonym for "Happy Hour" by bars and restaurants that serve discounted drinks after working hours.
claque
a group of admirers; in French, "la claque" is a group of people paid to applaud or disturb a piece at the theatre, though the common meaning of "claque" is "a slap"; clique is used in this sense (but in a pejorative way).
connoisseur
an expert in wines, fine arts, or other matters of culture; a person of refined taste. It is spelled connaisseur in modern French (lit. 'someone who knows').
corsage
A bouquet of flowers worn on a woman's dress or worn around her wrist. In French, it refers to a woman's chest (from shoulder to waist) and, by extension, the part of a woman's garment that covers this area.
coup de main (pl. coups de main)
a surprise attack. In French, [donner] un coup de main means "[to give] a hand" (to give assistance). Even if the English meaning exists as well (as in faire le coup de main), it is old-fashioned.
coup d'état (pl. coups d'état)
a sudden change in government by force; literally "hit (blow) of state." French uses the capital É, because the use of a capital letter alters the meaning of the word (État: a State, as in a country; état: a state of being). It also cannot be shortened as coup as is often the case in English- because this literally means a "hit" in French, but can be used figuratively to mean many more things.
début
first public performance of an entertainment personality or group. In French, it means "beginning." The English meaning of the word exists only when in the plural form: [faire] ses débuts [sur scène] (to make one's débuts on the stage). The English meaning and usage also extends to sports to denote a player who is making their first appearance for a team or at an event.
décolletage
a low-cut neckline, cleavage. In French it means: 1. action of lowering a female garment's neckline; 2. Agric.: cutting leaves from some cultivated roots such as beets, carrots, etc.; 3. Tech. Operation consisting of making screws, bolts, etc. one after another out of a single bar of metal on a parallel lathe. A low-cut neckline, or its shape, would in French be called un décolleté (noun and adjective): un décolleté profond, a deep décolletage; une robe très décolletée, a dress with very low neckline.
démarche
a decisive step. In French, it means a preparing step (often used in the plural form), a specific set of steps to get a specific result (can be used in the singular form, sometimes the expression "marche à suivre" (lit. 'step to follow') will be preferred), or a distinctive way of walking.
dépanneur
a neighbourhood general/convenience store, term used in eastern Canada (often shortened to dép or dep). This term is commonly used in Canadian French; however, in France, it means a repairman or tow truck operator. In France, a convenience store would be a supérette or épicerie [de quartier].
émigré
one who has emigrated for political reasons. French also use the word exilé (exiled) or réfugié (refugee) or even "exilé politique" or "réfugié politique".
encore
A request to repeat a performance, as in Encore!, lit. 'again'; also used to describe additional songs played at the end of a gig. Francophones would say « Une autre ! » ('Another one!') or «Bis !» to request « un rappel » or « un bis ».
en masse
in a mass or group, all together. In French, masse refers only to a physical mass, whether for people or objects. It cannot be used for something immaterial, like, for example, the voice: "they all together said 'get out'" would be translated as ils ont dit 'dehors' en chœur ([like a chorus]). Also, en masse refers to numerous people or objects (a crowd or a mountain of things). In colloquial Québécois French, it means "a bunch" (as in il y avait du monde en masse, "there was a bunch of people").
en suite
as a set (not to be confused with ensuite, meaning "then"). Can refer, in particular, to hotel rooms with attached private bathroom, especially in Britain where hotels without private facilities are more common than in North America. In French, suite, when in the context of a hotel, already means several rooms following each other. J'ai loué une suite au Ritz would be translated as "I rented a suite at the Ritz." En suite is not grammatically incorrect in French, but it is not an expression in itself and it is not used. Also used in British English to denote a bathroom that is accessible directly from the master bedroom of a house (usually with a connecting door), rather than by a separate entrance.
entrée
lit. "entrance"; in French, the first dish that starts a meal, i.e. the entrance to the meal. It can refer to a set of bites or small snacks, or a small dish served before a main course. The main dish or "plat de résistance" comes after the entrée. In American English, the meaning has migrated to "main dish". In other varieties of English it maintains its French meaning.
épée
a fencing weapon descended from the duelling sword. In French, apart from fencing (the sport) the term is more generic: it means sword.
escritoire
a writing table. It is spelt écritoire in modern French.
exposé
a published exposure of a fraud or scandal (past participle of "to expose"); in French refers to a talk or a report on any kind of subject.
femme
a stereotypically effeminate gay man or lesbian (slang, pronounced as written). In French, femme (pronounced 'fam') means "woman."
fin de siècle
comparable to (but not exactly the same as) turn-of-the-century but with a connotation of decadence, usually applied to the period from 1890 through 1910. In French, it means "end of the century", but it isn't a recognized expression as such. The French expression "ambiance [de] fin de règne" (lit. 'end-of-reign atmosphere') also has a light connotation of boredom and decadence.
forte
a strength, a strong point, typically of a person, from the French fort(e) (strong) and/or Italian forte (strong, esp. "loud" in music) and/or Latin forte (neuter form of fortis, strong). French uses fort(e) for both people and objects.
According to Merriam Webster Dictionary, "In forte we have a word derived from French that in its "strong point" sense has no entirely satisfactory pronunciation. Usage writers have denigrated \'for-"tA\ and \'for-tE\ because they reflect the influence of the Italian-derived forte. Their recommended pronunciation \'fort\, however, does not exactly reflect French either: the French would write the word le fort and would rhyme it with English for [French doesn't pronounce the final "t"]. All are standard, however. In British English \'fo-"tA\ and \'fot\ predominate; \'for-"tA\ and \for-'tA\ are probably the most frequent pronunciations in American English."
The New Oxford Dictionary of English derives it from fencing. In French, le fort d'une épée is the third of a blade nearer the hilt, the strongest part of the sword used for parrying.

hors d'oeuvres
term used for the snacks served with drinks before a meal. Literally "outside of the work". The French use apéritif to refer to the time before a meal and the drinks consumed during that time, yet "hors d'œuvre" is a synonym of "entrée" in French and means the first dish that starts a meal. At home in family circles it means more specifically seasoned salads taken as a starter. In Québécois French, apéritif refers to the drink only, and hors-d'œuvre (usually plural) refers to a set of bites, while an entrée is a small dish (an entrée can be made as hors-d'œuvres, but not all of them are).
lavatoire or lavatory
A once commonly used British term for a toilet or water closet. Before the age of the internet, it was commonly believed, and widely taught in schools in Britain, that the word "toilet" was a rather vulgar corruption of the French word "toilettes" and that "lavatory" was the correct expression to use because it was much closer in meaning to the French the word it was derived from, "lavatoire," which was supposed to mean "to wash, or to clean, yourself." Actually, though the word lavatoire does exist in French, it never meant a toilet or a bathroom. The lavatoire was the holy stone upon which the bodies of ecclesiastics, priest and members of the clergy, were once washed after their deaths, in order to prepare them for the afterlife, for their journey to heaven.
marquee
the sign above a theater that indicates what is playing. From marquise, which means not only a marchioness but also an awning. Theater buildings are generally old and nowadays there is never such a sign above them; there is only the advertisement for the play (l'affiche). In English, means a temporary structure (often made of canvas or similar material) which is erected to host an event outdoors, especially in the UK, where such events can often be affected by weather conditions (pronounced mar-key).
nostalgie de la boue
"yearning for the mud"; attraction to what is unworthy, crude or degrading. Though grammatically correct, it is not used in French.
objet trouvé
an ordinary object, such as a piece of driftwood, a shell, or a manufactured article, that is treated as an objet d'art because it is aesthetically pleasing. In French, les objets trouvés, short for le bureau des objets trouvés, means the lost-and-found, the lost property.
outré
out of the ordinary, unusual. In French, it means outraged (for a person) or exaggerated, extravagant, overdone (for a thing, esp. a praise, an actor's style of acting, etc.); in that second meaning, belongs to "literary" style.
passé
out of fashion. The correct expression in French is passé de mode. Passé means past, passed, or (for a colour) faded.
peignoir
a woman's dressing gown. Peignoir means bathrobe in French (for either sex, in absorbent material), whereas a dressing gown is called robe de chambre also regardless of sex. Peignoir and robe de chambre may be used interchangeably, as bathrobe and dressing gown in English.
pièce d'occasion
"occasional piece"; item written or composed for a special occasion. In French, it means "second-hand hardware." Can be shortened as pièce d'occas' or even occas' (pronounced /okaz/).
portmanteau (pl. portmanteaux)
In English, a portmanteau is a large piece of luggage for clothes that opens (like a book or a diptych) into two parts. From this literal sense, Lewis Carroll, in his novel Through the Looking Glass, playfully coined a further figurative sense for portmanteau: a word that fuses two or more words or parts of words to give a combined meaning. (For example, "Brexit" or "emoticon"). In French, portemanteau (lit. 'carry-coat') was originally a person who carried the royal coat or dress train; now a large suitcase; more often, a clothes hanger. The equivalent of the English portmanteau word is un mot-valise (lit. 'word-suitcase').
potpourri
medley, mixture; French write it pot-pourri, literally 'rotten pot': primarily a pot in which different kinds of flowers or spices are put to dry for years for the scent.
précis
a concise summary. In French, when talking about a school course, it means an abridged book about the matter. Literally, précis means precise, accurate.
première
refers to the first performance of a play, a film, etc. "La première" is used in same way in French, but it more generally means "the first".
raisonneur
a type of author intrusion in which a writer inserts a character to argue the author's viewpoint; alter ego, sometimes called 'author avatar'. In French, a raisonneur is a character in a play who stands for morality and reason, i.e., not necessarily the author's point of view. The first meaning of this word though is a man (fem. raisonneuse) who overdoes reasonings, who tires by objecting with numerous arguments to every order.
recherché
lit. searched; obscure; pretentious. In French, means 'sophisticated' or 'delicate', or simply 'studied', without the negative connotations of the English.
rendezvous
lit. "present yourself" or "proceed to"; a meeting, appointment, or date in French. In English, it generally endorses a mysterious overtone and refers to a one-on-one meeting with someone for another purpose than a date. Always hyphenated in French: rendez-vous. Its only accepted abbreviation in French is RDV. The word is derived from the imperative form of the reflexive verb se rendre.

reprise
repetition of previous music in a suite, programme, etc. and also applied to an actor who resumes a role that they have played previously. In French, it may mean an alternate version of a piece of music, or a cover version, or the rebroadcast of a show, piece or movie that was originally broadcast a while ago (although the term rediffusion is generally preferred, especially when talking about something on television). To express the repetition of a previous musical theme, French would exclusively use the Italian term coda.
résumé
in North American English, a document listing one's qualifications for employment. In French, it means summary; French speakers would use instead curriculum vitæ, or its abbreviation, C.V. (like most other English speakers).
risqué (also risque)
sexually suggestive; in French, the meaning of risqué is "risky", with no sexual connotation. Francophones use instead osé (lit. 'daring') or sometimes dévergondé (very formal language). Osé, unlike dévergondé, cannot be used for people themselves, only for things (such as pictures) or attitudes.
rouge (lit. 'red')
1) a rouge is red makeup, also called blusher. Rouge à lèvres is French for "lipstick", even if the lipstick is not red at all. The French equivalent to the English meaning is "fard à joues"; 2) in Canadian football, a rouge is awarded when the ball is kicked into the end zone by any legal means, other than a successful field goal, and the receiving team does not return or kick the ball out of its end zone.
séance
a gathering, usually using a 'medium', attempting to communicate with the dead. In French, the word means 'sitting' and usually refers to any kind of meeting or session.
table d'hôte (pl. tables d'hôte)
in English, when used it usually refers to type of meal: a full-course meal offered at a fixed price. However, in French, it refers to a type of lodging: the closest English equivalent would be "a bed & breakfast" or "B&B." The origin of the meaning (for French speakers) is that at a table d'hôte (literally "table of the house" or "table of the host"), unlike at a full-service purpose-built hotel, all patrons eat together at the host's table, whatever the family have prepared for themselves (typically traditional regional dishes). Indeed, in France today a lodging labeled "table d'hôte" might perhaps not even offer food; the appellation meaning what an English-speaker would think of as a "bed & breakfast -style" family-home lodging (as opposed to a purpose-built hotel). In Quebec, table d'hôte generally has the same meaning as in English, the expression couette et café (lit. 'duvet and coffee') is generally used to talk about B&B style accommodations, where the English expression is not used.
tableau vivant (pl. tableaux vivants, often shortened as tableau)
in drama, a scene where actors remain motionless as if in a picture. Tableau means painting, tableau vivant, living painting. In French, it is an expression used in body painting.
touché
acknowledgment of an effective counterpoint. In French, used for "emotionally touched".
vignette
a brief description; a short scene. In French, it is a small picture or a thumbnail. By extension a vignette is the name of a compulsory road tax in the form of a small sticker affixed to a vehicle windscreen, which is now also used in several European countries.

== Found only in English ==
cinquefoil
five-petal, five-leaf flower of the genus Potentilla, family Rosaceae; also a circular 5-lobed ornamental design. Spelled quintefeuille in French.
cri de cœur
"cry from the heart": an impassioned outcry, as of entreaty or protest. In French, the exact expression is cri du cœur.
demi-monde
a class of women of ill repute; a fringe group or subculture. Fell out of use in the French language in the 19th century. Frenchmen still use une demi-mondaine to qualify a woman that lives (exclusively or partially) off the commerce of her charms but in a high-life style.
double entendre
a figure of speech wherein a word or phrases can be taken to have two distinct coherent meanings, most often in a fashion that is suggestive and/or ironic. "Entendre" is an infinitive verb ("to hear"), not a noun; a correct rendering would be "à double entente", an adjectival phrase meaning "of a double understanding or double interpretation" (literally, "with a double hearing"). The modern French phrase is "à double sens".
in lieu (of)
"in place (of)"; partially translated from the existing French phrase au lieu (de).
léger de main (legerdemain)
"light of hand": sleight of hand, usually in the context of deception or the art of stage magic tricks. Meaningless in French; the equivalent is un tour de passe-passe.
maître d'
translates literally as master o'. The French term for head waiter (the manager of the service side of a restaurant) is maître d'hôtel (literally "master of the house" or "master of the establishment"); French never uses "d'" stand-alone. Most often used in American English and its usage in the UK is rare.
negligée
A robe or a dressing gown, usually of sheer or soft fabric for women, or a nightdress. As with lingerie, the usage of the word suggests the garment is alluring or fancy. French uses négligé (masculine form) or nuisette. In French, the word négligée qualifies a woman who neglects her appearance.
voir dire
a trial within a trial, or (in America) jury selection (Law French). Literally "to speak the truth." (Anglo-Norman voir [truth] is etymologically unrelated to the modern French voir [to see].) In modern American court procedure, the examination of prospective jurors for their qualification to serve, including inherent biases, views and predilections; during this examination, each prospective juror must "speak the truth" so that counsel and the court may decide whether they should remain on the jury or be excused. In England and Wales, the expression is used to refer to a "trial within a trial", during which a judge hears evidence in the absence of the jury, typically to decide whether a certain piece of evidence should be allowed to be presented to the jury or not. For example, a judge might hold a "voir dire" to determine whether a confession has been extracted from a defendant by an unfair inducement in order to decide whether the jury should hear evidence of the confession or not.

== French phrases in international air-sea rescue ==
International authorities have adopted a number of words and phrases from French for use by speakers of all languages in voice communications during air-sea rescues. Note that the "phonetic" versions of spelling are presented as shown and not the IPA.

PAN PAN
(panne, "breakdown") the following is a message concerning a danger to a person or ship, the next level of danger.
MAYDAY
([venez] m'aider, come to help me"; aidez-moi means "help me") the following is a message of extreme urgency, the highest level of danger. (MAYDAY is used on voice channels for the same uses as SOS on Morse channels.)
SEELONCE
(silence, "silence") keep this channel clear for air-sea rescue communications.
SEELONCE FEE NEE
(silence fini, "silence is over") this channel is now available again.
PRU DONCE
(prudence, "prudence") silence partially lifted, channel may be used again for urgent non-distress communication.
MAY DEE CAL
(médical, "medical") medical assistance needed.

It is a serious breach in most countries, and in international zones, to use any of these phrases without justification.

See Mayday (distress signal) for a more detailed explanation.

== See also ==
- Glossary of ballet, which is predominantly French
- Glossary of fencing, which are often in French
- Franglais
- French language
- Law French
- English words of French origin
- Influence of French on English
- Pseudo-Gallicisms
- German expressions in English
- Greek phrases
- Latin phrases
- Latin words with English derivatives
- French loanwords in Persian
