= Pout =

Pout or pouting may refer to:

- A type of facial expression that involves pushing out one's lips
  - Air kiss
  - Duck face
- Pout, Senegal, a commune in Thiès Region, western Senegal
- Trisopterus luscus or Pouting, a fish in the family Gadidae
- Ocean pout, a kind of eelpout in the family Zoarcidae
- Brown bullhead, or "horned pout", a widespread species of small catfish native to the Eastern United States
