= Gendarme (disambiguation) =

A gendarme (/ˈʒɑːndɑːrm/; French: [ʒɑ̃daʁm]) is a member of a gendarmerie, although the word is often incorrectly used to refer to any French policeman.

Gendarme may also refer to:

- Gendarme (historical) (or gens d'arme), a French medieval or early modern cavalryman
- Gendarme (mountaineering), an isolated pinnacle of rock on a mountain peak or ridge
