= Mange tout =

Mange tout (French for "eat all") mangetout or mange-tout may refer to:

- Sugar pea or edible-pod pea including:
  - Snap pea with rounded pods and thick pod walls
  - Snow pea with flat pods and thin pod walls
- Mange Tout, 1984 album by Blancmange
- Monsieur Mangetout (Michel Lotito, 1950–2007), French entertainer
- "Mangetout", a 2025 song by Wet Leg from Moisturizer
