= Snow pea =

Type of edible-pod pea

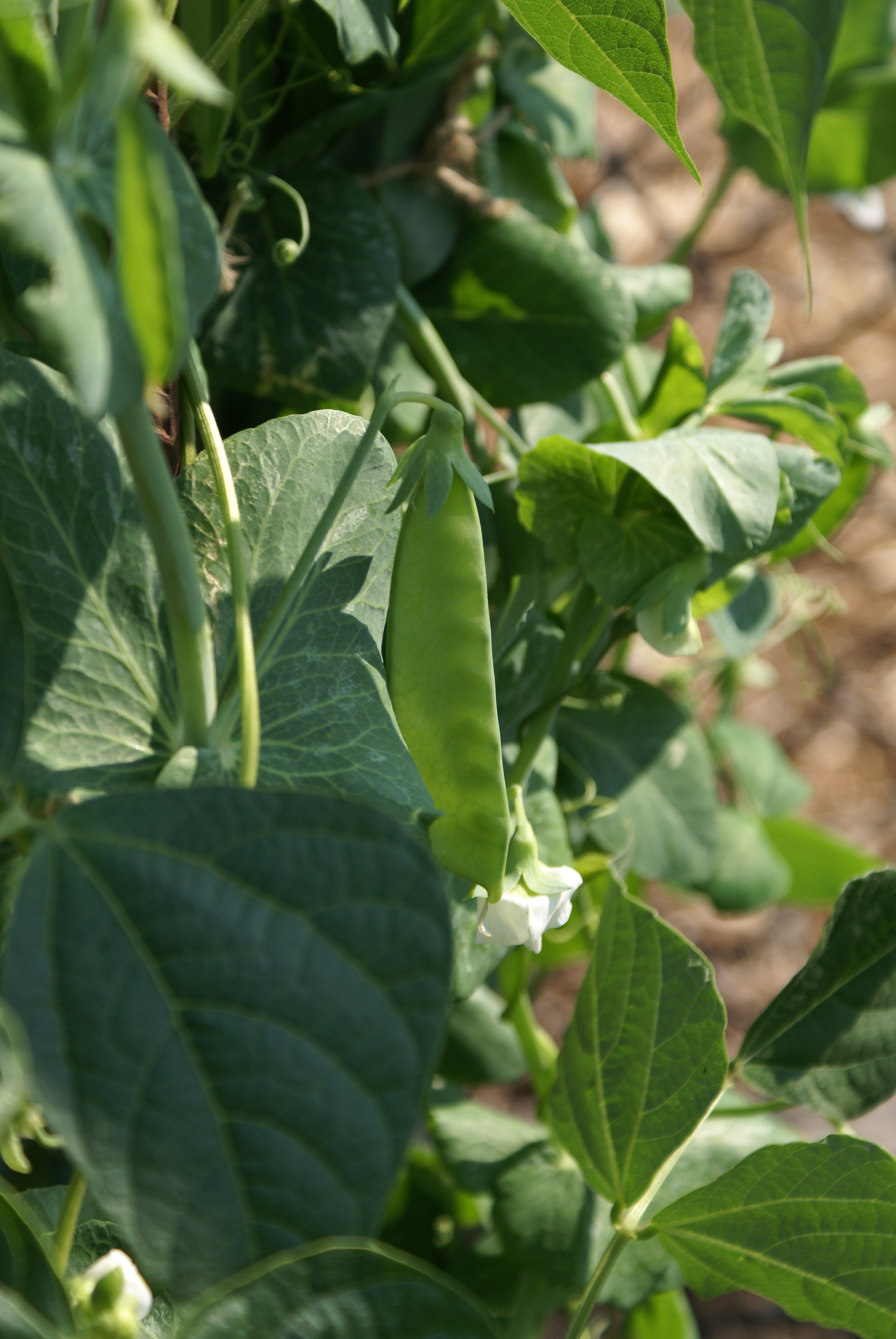
- Species: Pisum sativum
- Cultivar group: Macrocarpon Group
- Cultivar group members: Many; see text.

The snow pea (British English: mangetout) is an edible-pod pea with flat pods and thin pod walls unlike snap pea pods, which are round with thick walls. It is eaten whole, with both the seeds and the pod, while still unripened.

== Names ==
The common name snow pea seems to be a misnomer as the planting season of this pea is no earlier than that of other peas. Another common name, Chinese pea, is probably related to its prominence in Chinese dishes served in the West. In Chinese, however, it's called Helandou or "Holland pea".

Snow peas and snap peas both belong to Macrocarpon Group, a cultivar group based on the variety Pisum sativum var. macrocarpum Ser.. The original 1825 publication described the variety as having very compressed non-leathery edible pods.

The scientific name Pisum sativum var. saccharatum Ser. is often misused for snow peas. The variety under this name was described as having sub-leathery and compressed-terete pods and the French name petit pois (which is the French term for tender garden pea). The description is inconsistent with the appearance of snow peas, and therefore botanists have replaced this name with Pisum sativum var. macrocarpum. Austrian scientist and monk Gregor Mendel used peas which he called Pisum saccharatum in his famous experiments demonstrating the heritable nature of specific traits, and this Latin name might not refer to the same varieties identified with modern snow peas.

== Uses ==
Snowpeas
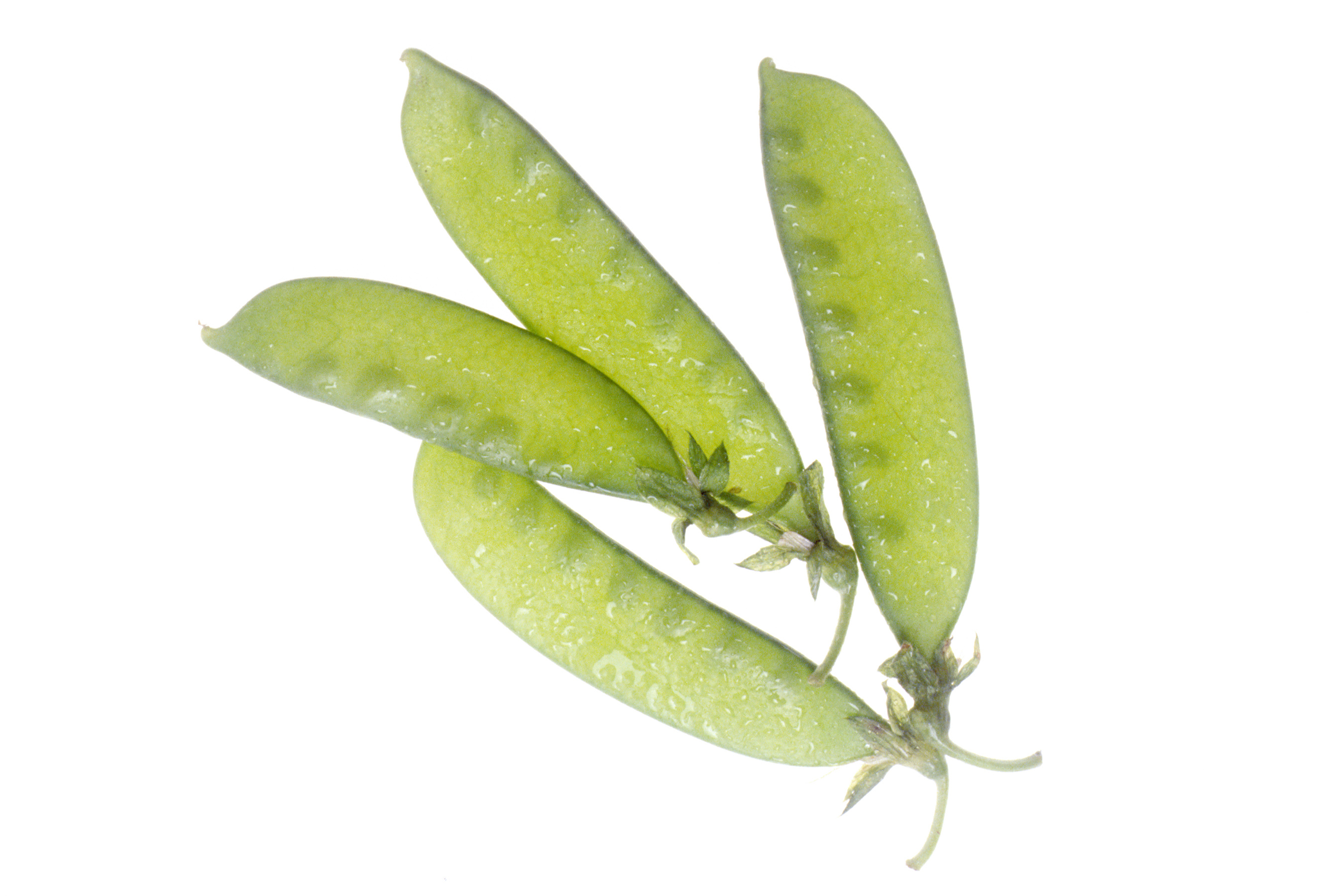
- Snow peas (Pisum sativum)

Nutritional value per 100g
- Energy: 176 kJ (42 kcal)
- Carbohydrates: 7.55
- Sugars: 4.00
- Dietary fiber: 2.6
- Fat: 0.3
- Protein: 2.8
Vitamins and minerals
| Vitamins | Quantity %DV^{†} |
| Vitamin A equiv. beta-Carotene lutein zeaxanthin | 6% 630 μg 740 μg |
| Vitamin A | 1087 IU |
| Thiamine (B1) | 13% 0.150 mg |
| Riboflavin (B2) | 6% 0.08 mg |
| Niacin (B3) | 4% 0.6 mg |
| Pantothenic acid (B5) | 15% 0.75 mg |
| Vitamin B6 | 9% 0.16 mg |
| Folate (B9) | 11% 42 μg |
| Vitamin B12 | 0% 0 μg |
| Choline | 3% 17.4 mg |
| Vitamin C | 67% 60 mg |
| Vitamin D | 0% 0 μg |
| Vitamin E | 3% 0.39 mg |
| Vitamin K | 21% 25 μg |
| Minerals | Quantity %DV^{†} |
| Calcium | 3% 43 mg |
| Iron | 12% 2.09 mg |
| Magnesium | 6% 24 mg |
| Manganese | 11% 0.244 mg |
| Phosphorus | 4% 53 mg |
| Potassium | 7% 200 mg |
| Sodium | 0% 4 mg |
| Zinc | 2% 0.27 mg |
- Other constituents: Quantity
- Water: 88.89
- ^{†}Percentages estimated using US recommendations for adults, except for potassium, which is estimated based on expert recommendation from the National Academies.

=== Culinary ===
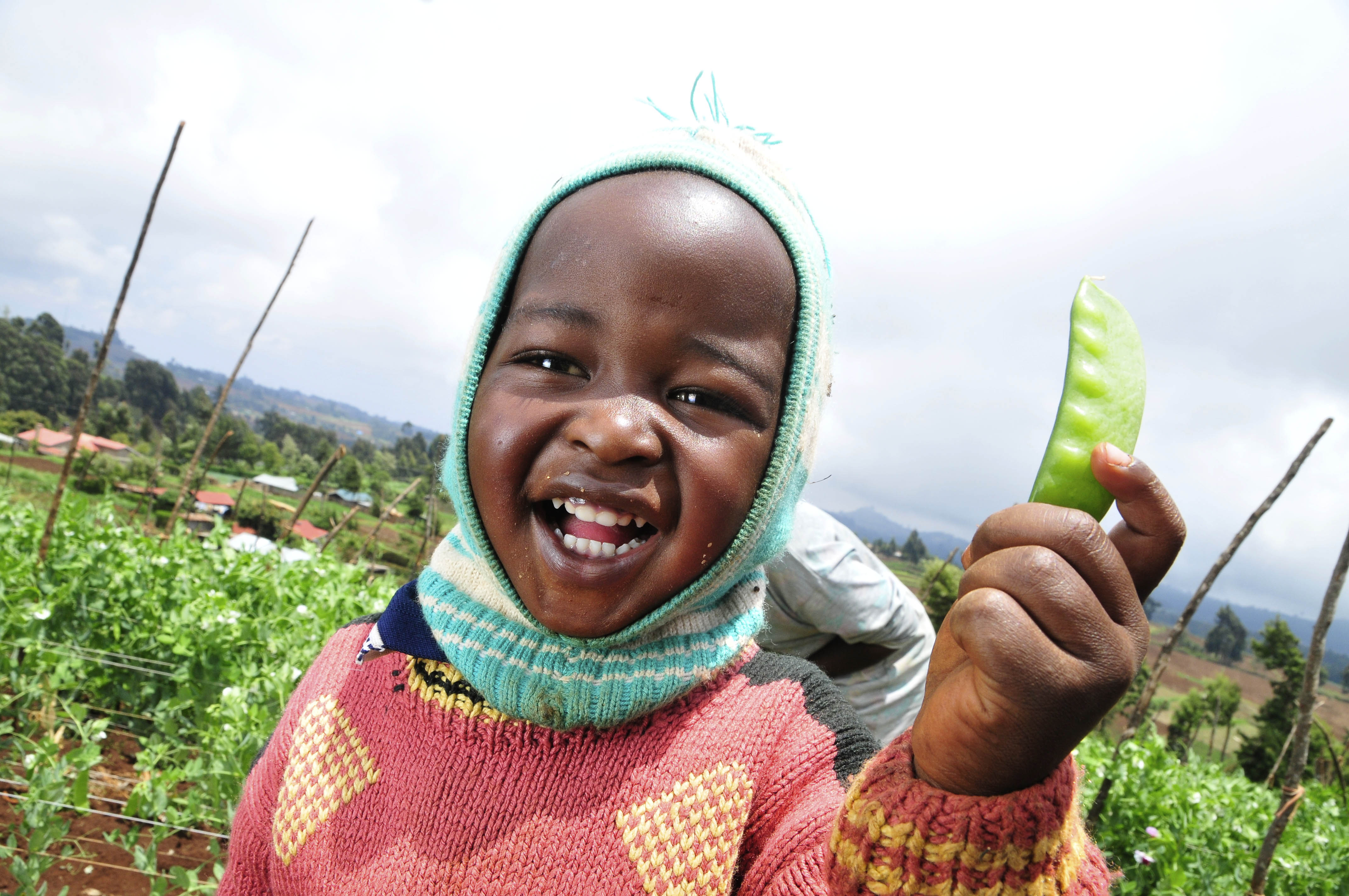
A child holding an edible pod pea in Kenya

Snow peas, along with snap peas and unlike field and garden peas, are notable for having edible pods that lack inedible fiber (in the form of "parchment", a fibrous layer found in the inner pod rich in lignin) in the pod walls. Snow peas have the thinner walls of the two edible pod variants. Two recessive genes known as p and v are responsible for this trait. p is responsible for reducing the sclerenchymatous membrane on the inner pod wall, while v reduces pod wall thickness (n is a gene that thickens pod walls in snap peas).

Pea shoots (Chinese: 豆苗; pinyin: dòu miáo) are the stems and leaves of the immature plant, used as a vegetable in Chinese cooking. They are commonly stir-fried with garlic and sometimes combined with crab or other shellfish.

=== Nitrogen fixers ===
As with most legumes, snow peas host beneficial bacteria, rhizobia, in their root nodules, which fix nitrogen in the soil—this is called a mutualistic relationship—and are therefore a useful companion plant, especially useful to grow intercropped with green, leafy vegetables that benefit from high nitrogen content in their soil.

== Cultivation ==
Snow peas can be grown in open fields during cool seasons and can thus be cultivated during winter and spring seasons.

=== Storage ===
Storage of the pea with films of polymethylpentene at a temperature of 5 °C (41 °F) and controlled atmosphere with a concentration of oxygen and carbon dioxide of 5 kPa augments the shelf life, internal and external characteristics of the plant.

== Gallery ==
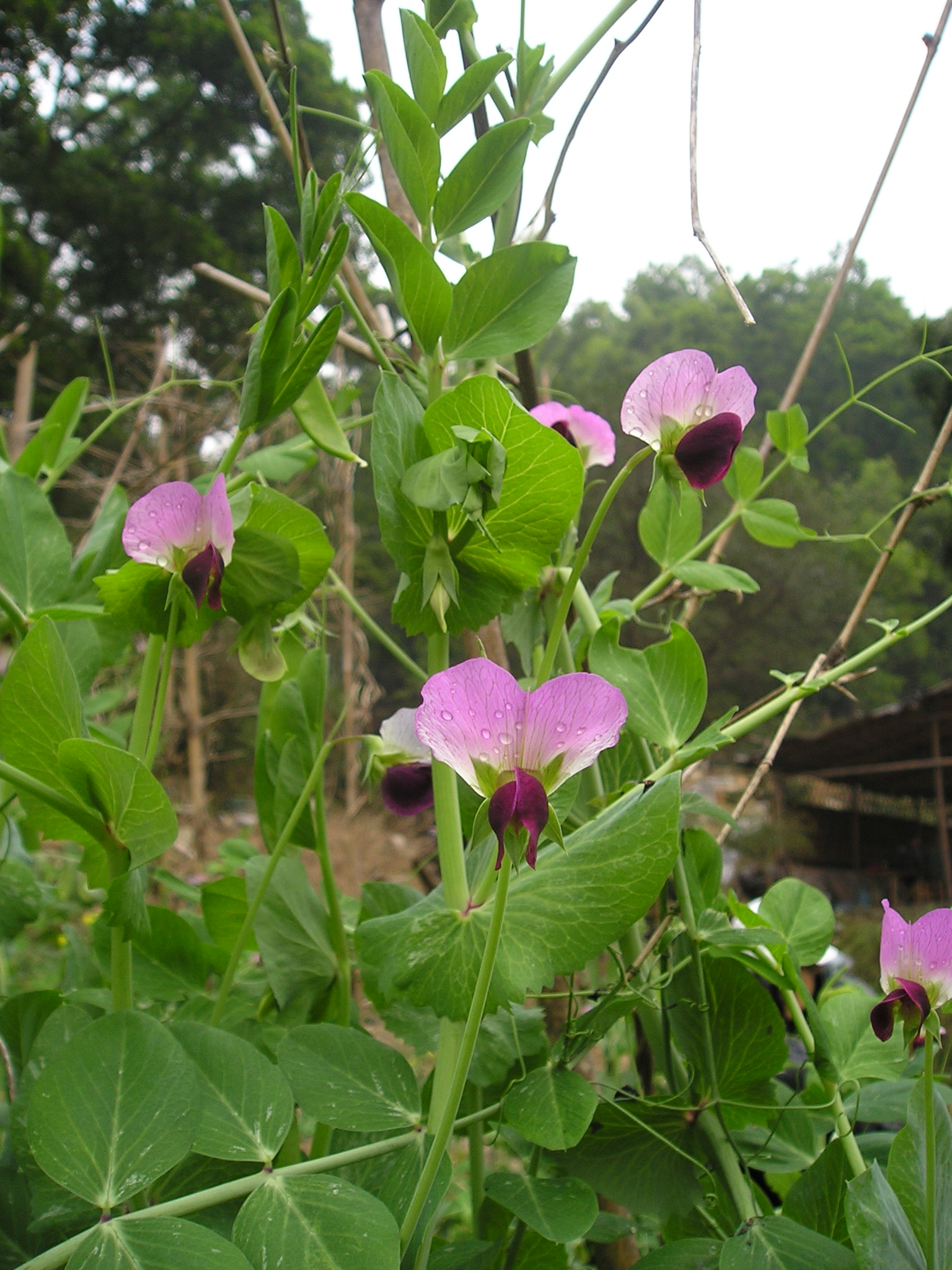
Snow pea flowers

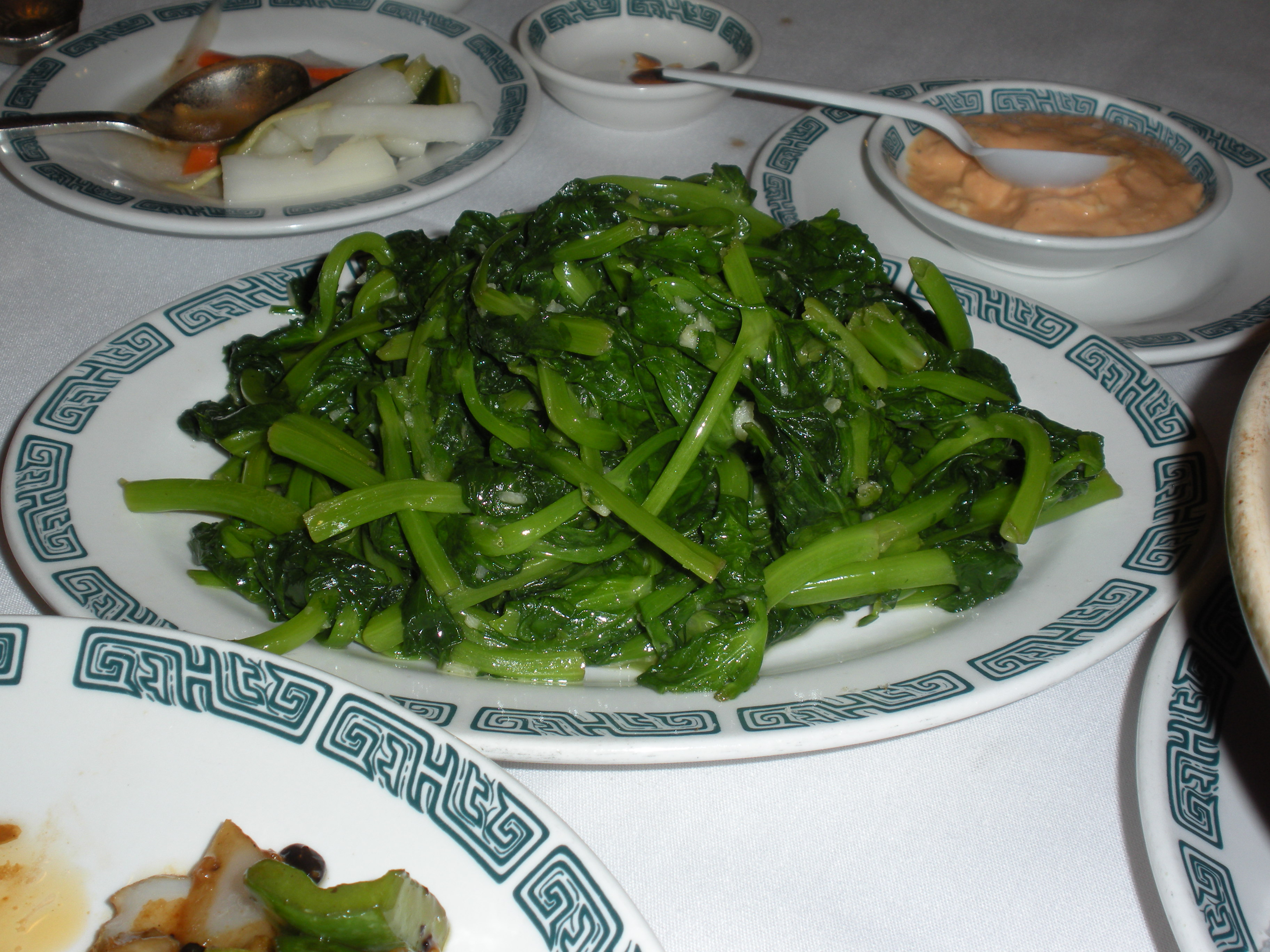
Sautéed snow pea shoots, a popular dish in Chinese cuisine

== See also ==
- List of companion plants
- Pea
- Rhizobia
- Snap pea
