= Snap pea =

Edible-pod pea

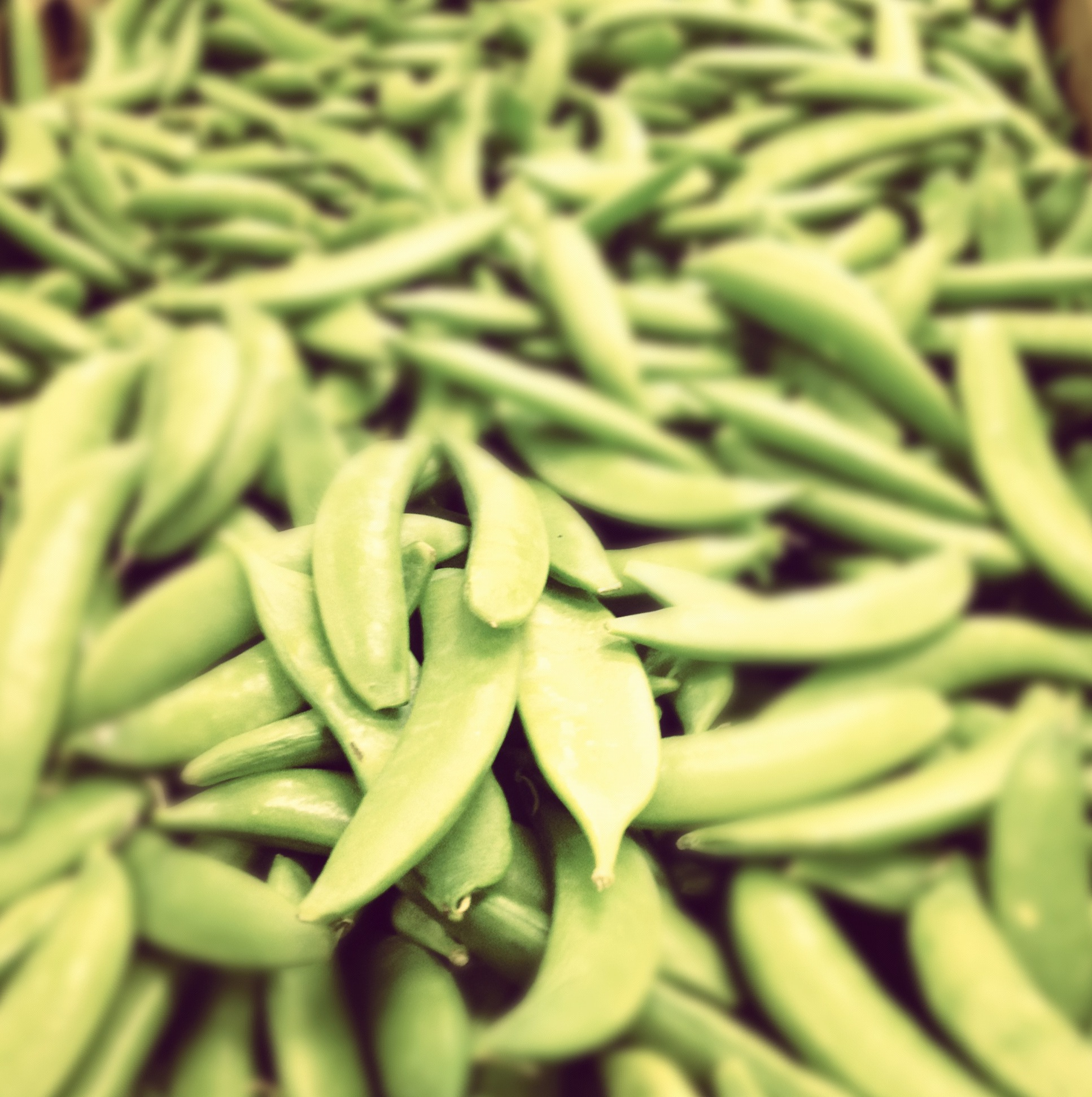
- Species: Pisum sativum
- Cultivar group: Macrocarpon Group
- Origin: Idaho, US
- Cultivar group members: Many; see text.

Peas, edible-podded, raw
Nutritional value per 100 g (3.5 oz)
- Energy: 176 kJ (42 kcal)
- Carbohydrates: 7.55 g
- Sugars: 4.0 g
- Dietary fiber: 2.6 g
- Fat: 0.39 g
- Saturated: 0.0039 g
- Monounsaturated: 0.021 g
- Polyunsaturated: 0.089 g
- Protein: 2.8 g
Amino acids
| Tryptophan | 0.027 g |
| Threonine | 0.099 g |
| Isoleucine | 0.161 g |
| Leucine | 0.228 g |
| Lysine | 0.202 g |
| Methionine | 0.011 g |
| Cystine | 0.032 g |
| Phenylalanine | 0.090 g |
| Tyrosine | 0.099 g |
| Valine | 0.273 g |
| Arginine | 0.134 g |
| Histidine | 0.017 g |
| Alanine | 0.058 g |
| Aspartic acid | 0.228 g |
| Glutamic acid | 0.448 g |
| Glycine | 0.072 g |
| Proline | 0.063 g |
| Serine | 0.125 g |
Vitamins and minerals
| Vitamins | Quantity %DV^{†} |
| Vitamin A equiv. beta-Carotene lutein zeaxanthin | 6% 54 μg 6% 630 μg 740 μg |
| Vitamin A | 1087 IU |
| Thiamine (B1) | 13% 0.15 mg |
| Riboflavin (B2) | 6% 0.08 mg |
| Niacin (B3) | 4% 0.6 mg |
| Pantothenic acid (B5) | 15% 0.75 mg |
| Vitamin B6 | 9% 0.16 mg |
| Folate (B9) | 11% 42 μg |
| Choline | 3% 17.4 mg |
| Vitamin C | 67% 60 mg |
| Vitamin E | 3% 0.39 mg |
| Vitamin K | 21% 25 μg |
| Minerals | Quantity %DV^{†} |
| Calcium | 3% 43 mg |
| Copper | 9% 0.079 mg |
| Iron | 12% 2.08 mg |
| Magnesium | 6% 24 mg |
| Manganese | 11% 0.244 mg |
| Phosphorus | 4% 53 mg |
| Potassium | 7% 200 mg |
| Sodium | 0% 4 mg |
| Zinc | 2% 0.27 mg |
- Other constituents: Quantity
- Water: 88.89 g
- ^{†}Percentages estimated using US recommendations for adults, except for potassium, which is estimated based on expert recommendation from the National Academies.

The snap pea, also known as the sugar snap pea, is an edible-pod pea with rounded pods and thick pod walls, in contrast to snow pea pods, which are flat with thin walls. The name mangetout (French for "eat all") can apply to snap peas and snow peas.

A snap pea named "butter pea" was described in French literature in the 19th century, but the old snap pea had been lost in cultivation by the mid-20th century. The present snap pea originated from Calvin Lamborn's cross between a shelling pea mutant found in 1952 by Dr. M.C. Parker and a snow pea cultivar. Researchers at Twin Falls, Idaho, hoped that the cross might counteract twisting and buckling seen in varieties at the time. With this cross, snap pea was re-created and the first new snap pea was released in 1979 under the name Sugar Snap.

Snap peas, like all other peas, are pod fruits. An edible-podded pea is similar to a garden, or English, pea, but the pod is less fibrous, and is edible when young. Pods of the edible-podded pea, including snap peas, do not have a membrane and do not open when ripe. At maturity, the pods grow to around 4 to 8 centimetres (1 1/2 to 3 inches) in length. Pods contain three to nine peas. The plants are climbing, and pea sticks or a trellis or other support system is required for optimal growth. Some cultivars are capable of climbing to 2 m (6 ft 7 in) high but plants are more commonly around 1 to 1.3 m (3 ft 3 in to 4 ft 3 in) high, for ease of harvest and cultivation.

== Cultivation ==
The snap pea is a cool season legume. It may be planted in spring as early as the soil can be worked. Seeds should be planted 25–40 mm (1–1 1/2 in) apart and 15–25 mm (1/2–1 in) deep in a 75 mm (3 in) band. It tolerates light frost when young; it also has a wider adaptation and tolerance of higher temperatures than some other pea cultivars. Snap peas may grow to 2 m (6 ft 7 in) or more, but more typically are about 1.3 m (4 ft 3 in). They have a vining habit and require a trellis or similar support structure. They should get 4–6 hours of sunlight each day. Plant pea seeds in soil with a pH of between 5.8 and 7.0 for best results.

=== Cultivars ===
Below is a list of several snap pea cultivars currently available, ordered by days to maturity. Days to maturity is from germination to edible pod stage; add about 7 days to estimate shell pea stage. Amish Snap is the only true heirloom snap pea. PMR indicates some degree of powdery mildew resistance; afila types, also called semi-leafless, maintain an erect, interlocked, plant habit that allows good air movement through the canopy and reduces risk from lodging and mold.

- Sugar Ann, 52 days, 1984 AAS winner
- Sugar Bon, 56 days
- Amish Snap, 60 days, tall climber, heirloom
- Cascadia, 60 days, PMR
- Sugar Daddy, 60 days
- Super Sugar Snap, 60 days, PMR, tall climber
- Sugar Snap, 62 days, tall climber, 1979 AAS winner
- Super Snappy, 65 days, PMR
- Sugar Lace II, 68 days, PMR, afila

=== Production ===
Commercial snap peas for export are produced in Peru, Guatemala, Colombia, Zimbabwe, Kenya and China.

== Uses ==
=== Culinary ===
Snap peas are often served in salads or eaten whole. They may also be stir-fried or steamed. Before being eaten, mature snap pea pods may need to be "stringed," which means the membranous string running along the top of the pod from base to tip is removed. Over-cooking the pods will make them come apart.
