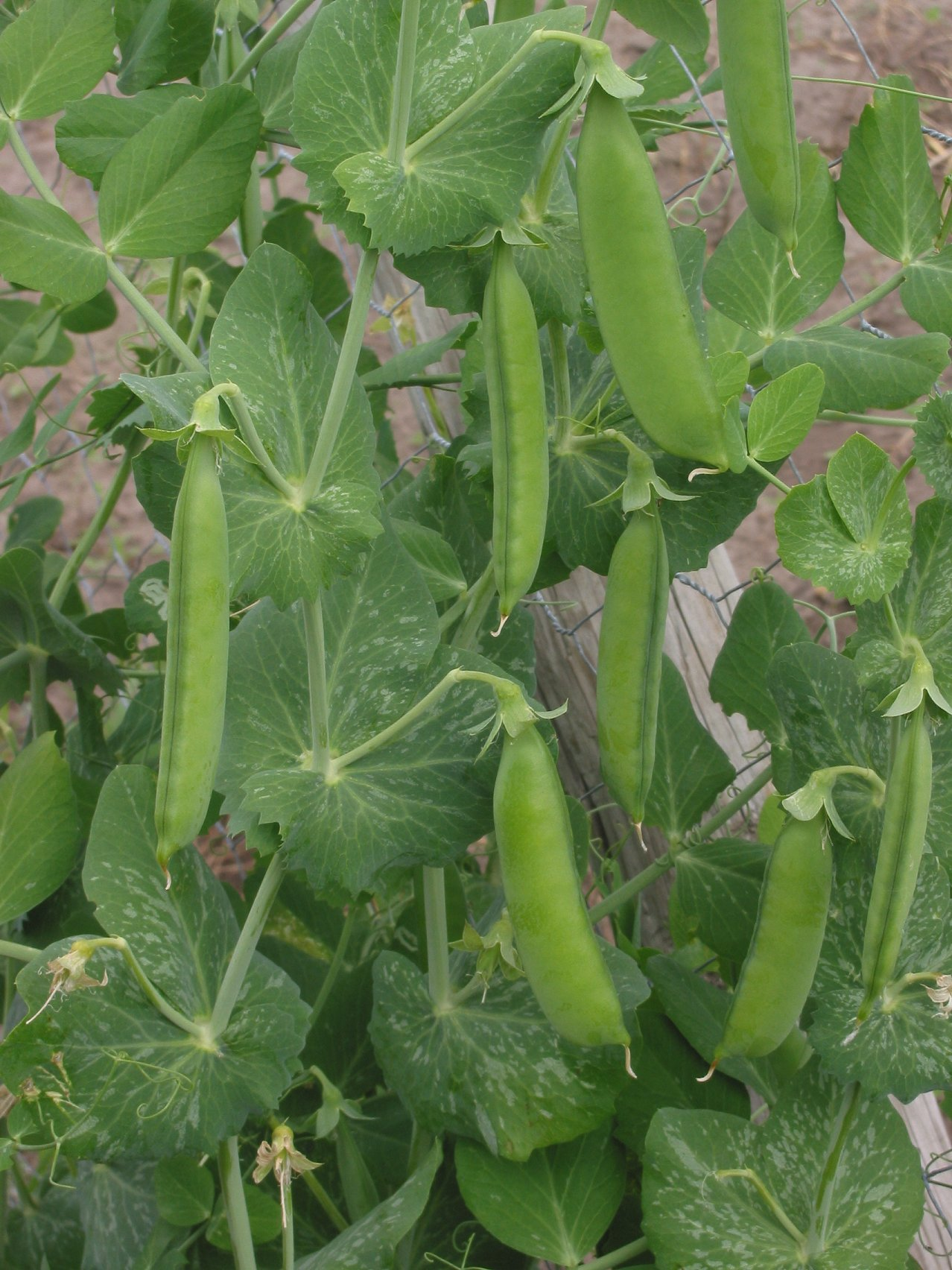
- Pea plant
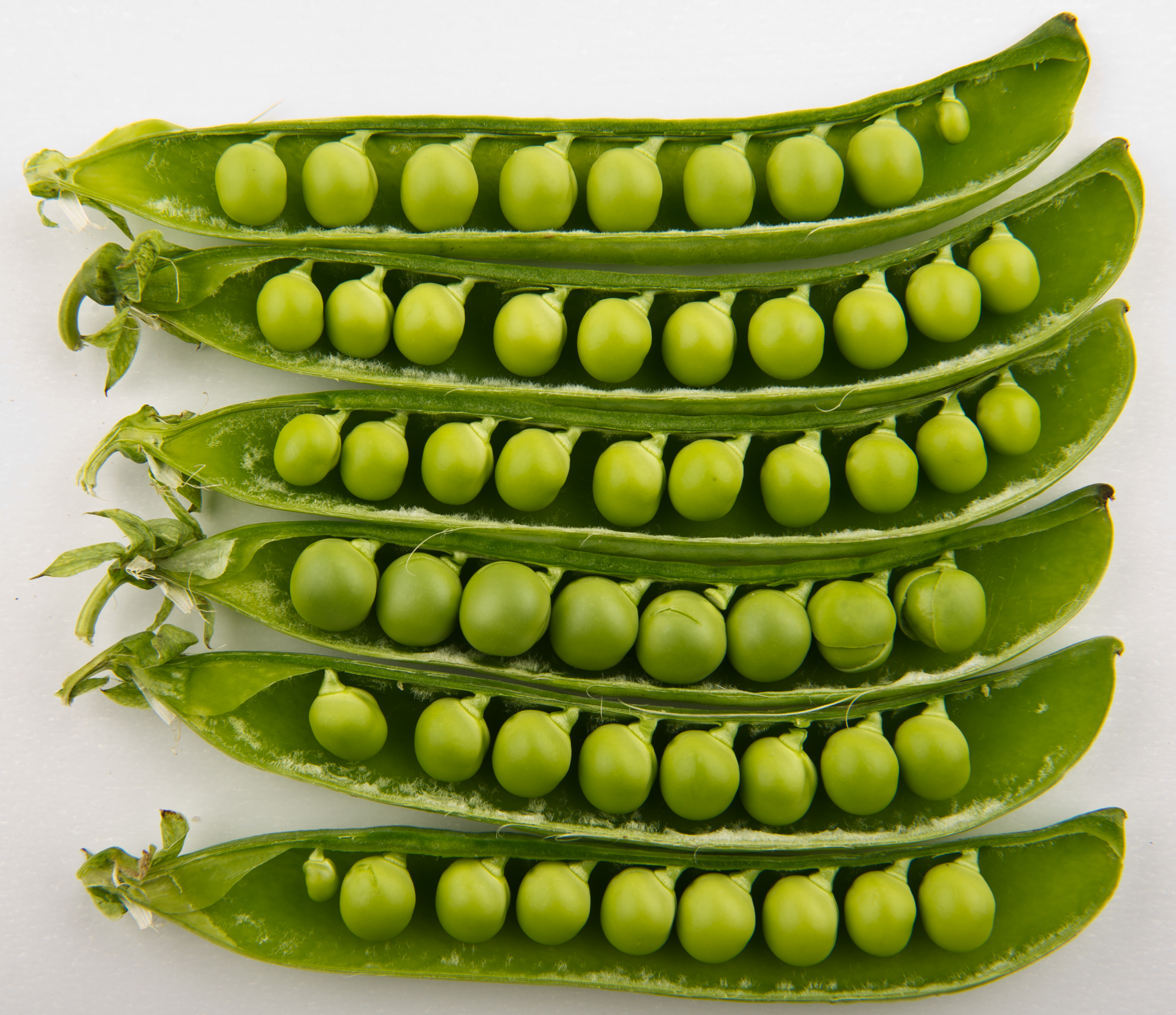
- Peas are produced in pods

Scientific classification
- Kingdom: Plantae
- Clade: Tracheophytes
- Clade: Angiosperms
- Clade: Eudicots
- Clade: Rosids
- Order: Fabales
- Family: Fabaceae
- Subfamily: Faboideae
- Genus: Lathyrus
- Species: L. oleraceus

Binomial name
- Lathyrus oleraceus Lam. (1779)

Synonyms
- Synonymy: Lathyrus schaeferi Kosterin (2017); Pisum abyssinicum A.Braun (1841); Pisum album Garsault (1764), opus utique rej.; Pisum arvense L. (1753); Pisum baclium Steud. (1841), not validly publ.; Pisum biflorum Raf. (1810); Pisum borussicum Steud. (1841), not validly publ.; Pisum chlorospermum Steud. (1841), not validly publ.; Pisum coccineum Medik. (1787); Pisum coerulescens Steud. (1841), not validly publ.; Pisum commune Clavaud (1884); Pisum elatius M.Bieb. (1808); Pisum elatum Ser. (1825); Pisum excorticatum Steud. (1841), not validly publ.; Pisum fertile Steud. (1841), not validly publ.; Pisum granulatum J.Lloyd (1844); Pisum hortense Asch. & Graebn. (1910); Pisum humile Mill. (1768); Pisum humile Boiss. & Noë (1856), nom. illeg.; Pisum jomardii Schrank (1805); Pisum leptolobum Rchb. (1832); Pisum macrocarpum Ser. ex Schur (1866); Pisum macrospermum Steud. (1841); Pisum oleraceus var. govorovii Golodk. (1935); Pisum praecox Steud. (1841); Pisum prolificum Steud. (1841); Pisum pumilio (Meikle) Greuter (1973); Pisum quadratum (L.) Rchb. (1832); Pisum ramulare Rchb. (1832); Pisum roseum Steud. (1841), not validly publ.; Pisum rugosum Steud. (1841), not validly publ.; Pisum saccharatum Rchb. (1832); Pisum sativum L. (1753); Pisum sibiricum Steud. (1841), not validly publ.; Pisum smyrnense Steud. (1841), not validly publ.; Pisum syriacum C.O.Lehm. ex El-Gadi & al. (1987), nom. superfl.; Pisum tetragonum Pasq. (1867); Pisum thebaicum Willd. (1814); Pisum transcaucasicum (Govorov) Stankov (1949), not validly publ.; Pisum tuffetii R.Lesson (1835); Pisum umbellatum (L.) Mill. (1768); Pisum uniflorum Moench (1794); Pisum variegatum C.Presl (1826); Pisum viride Steud. (1841), not validly publ.; Pisum vulgare J.Jundz. (1830); Pisum zeylanicum Steud. (1841), not validly publ.

= Pea =

Species of plant with edible seeds

Pea is a pulse or fodder crop, but the word often refers to the seed or sometimes the pod of this flowering plant species. Peas are eaten as a vegetable. The pea is native to the Mediterranean region and southwest Asia, and cultivated nearly worldwide.

Carl Linnaeus gave the species the scientific name Pisum sativum in 1753 (meaning cultivated pea). Some sources now treat it as Lathyrus oleraceus; however the need and justification for the change is disputed. The name "Pea" is also used to describe other edible seeds from the Fabaceae such as the pigeon pea (Cajanus cajan), the cowpea (Vigna unguiculata), the seeds from several species of Lathyrus, and Sturt's desert pea (Swainsona formosa).

Each pod contains several seeds (peas), which can have green or yellow cotyledons when mature. Botanically, pea pods are fruit, since they contain seeds and develop from the ovary of a pea flower.

Peas are annual plants, with a life cycle of one year. They are a cool-season crop grown in many parts of the world; planting can take place from winter to early summer depending on location. The average pea weighs between 100 and 360 milligrams (1 1/2–5 1/2 grains). The immature peas (and in snow peas and snap peas the tender pod as well) are used as a vegetable, fresh, frozen or canned; varieties of the species typically called field peas are grown to produce dry peas like the split pea shelled from a matured pod. These are the basis of pease porridge and pea soup, staples of medieval cuisine; in Europe, consuming fresh immature green peas was an innovation of early modern cuisine.

== Description ==
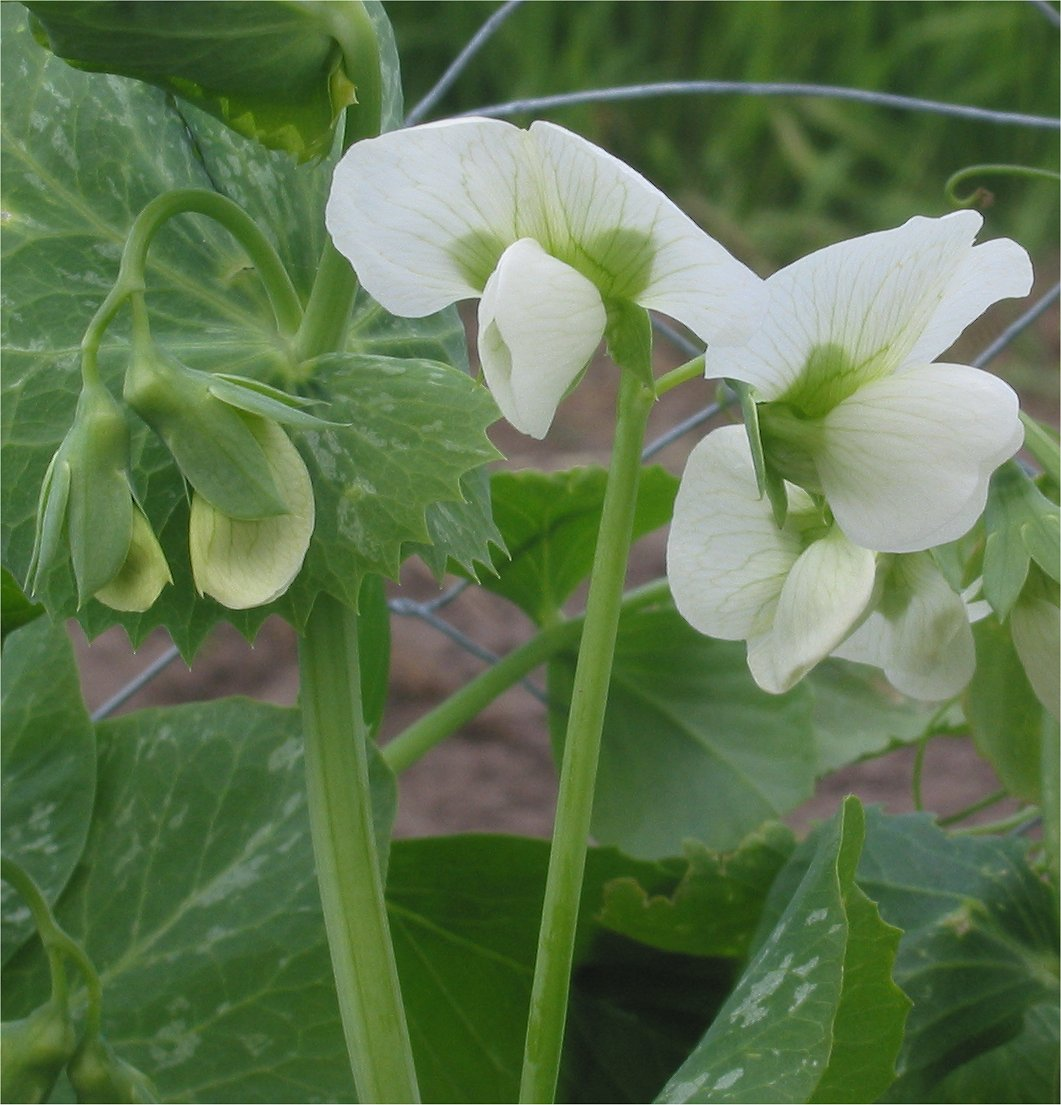
Flowers

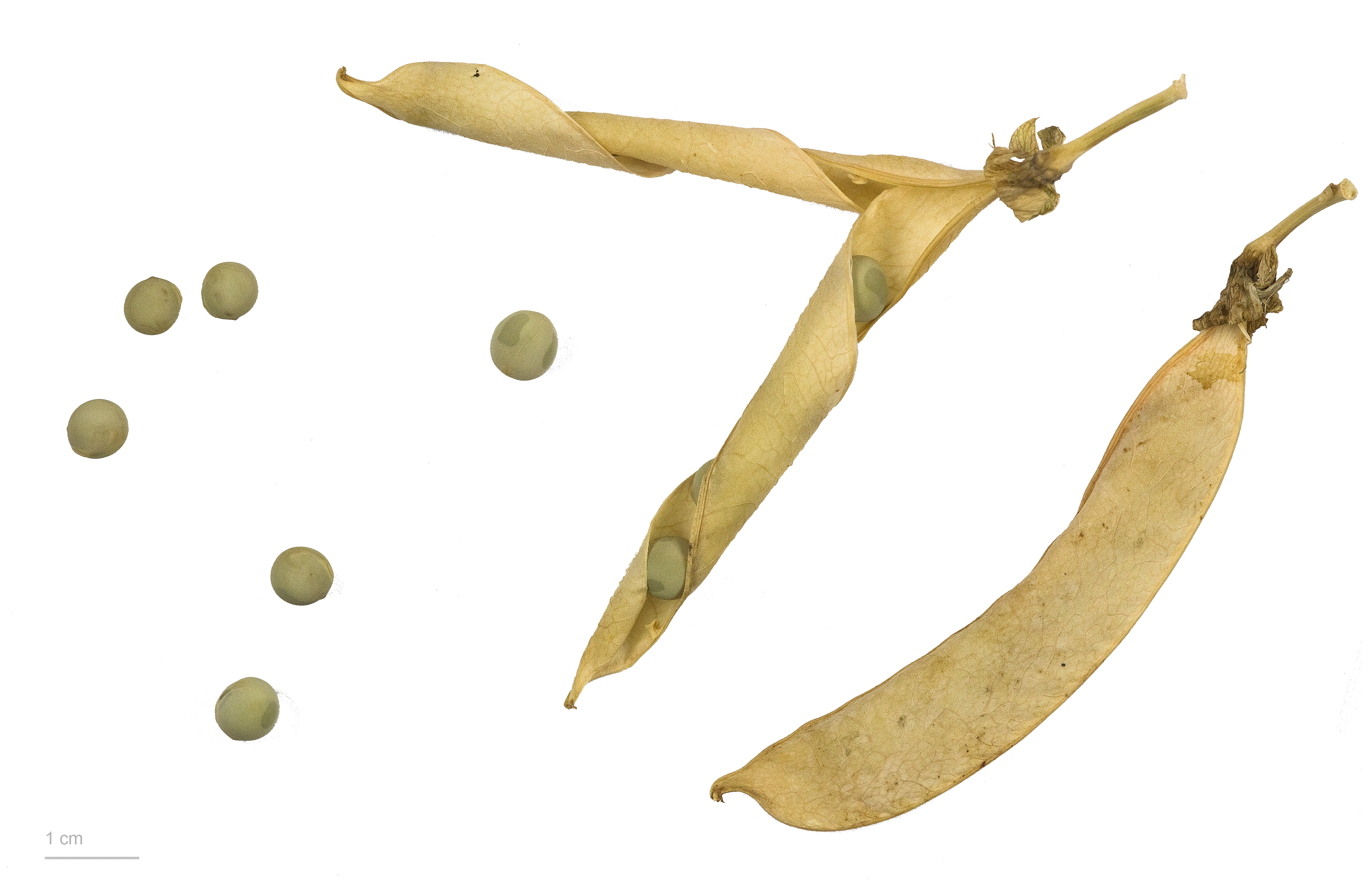
Ripe pods dehiscing to shed ripe seeds (MHNT)

A pea is a most commonly green, occasionally golden yellow, or infrequently purple pod-shaped vegetable, the pod has a length of about 4 to 10 centimetres (2 to 4 in), the fruit is widely grown as a cool-season crop. The seeds may be planted as soon as the soil temperature reaches 10 °C (50 °F), with the plants growing best at temperatures of 13 to 18 °C (55 to 64 °F). They do not thrive in the summer heat of warmer temperate and lowland tropical climates, but do grow well in cooler, high-elevation, tropical areas. Many cultivars reach maturity about 60 days after planting.

Peas have both low-growing and vining cultivars. The vining cultivars grow thin tendrils from leaves that coil around any available support and can climb to be 1 to 2 metres (3 to 7 ft) high. A traditional approach to supporting climbing peas is to thrust branches pruned from trees or other woody plants upright into the soil, providing a lattice for the peas to climb. Branches used in this fashion are called pea sticks or sometimes pea brush. Metal fences, twine, or netting supported by a frame are used for the same purpose. In dense plantings, peas give each other some measure of mutual support. Pea plants can self-pollinate.

=== Genome ===
The pea karyotype consists of seven chromosomes, five of which are acrocentric and two submetacentric. Despite its scientific popularity, its relatively large genome size (4.45Gb) made it challenging to sequence compared to other legumes such as Medicago truncatula and soybeans. The International Pea Genome Sequencing Consortium was formed to develop the first pea reference genome, and the draft assembly was officially announced in September 2019. It covers 88% of the genome (3.92Gb) and predicted 44,791 gene-coding sequences. The pea used for the assembly was the inbred French cultivar "Caméor". In 2022, a pea pangenome was published.

== Taxonomy ==
Carl Linnaeus gave the species the scientific name Pisum sativum in 1753 (meaning cultivated pea). Some sources now treat it as Lathyrus oleraceus, although the need and justification for this change is disputed.

== Etymology ==
The term pea originates from the Latin word pisum, which is the latinisation of the Greek πίσον (pison), neuter variant form of πίσος (pisos) 'pea'. It was adopted into English as the noun pease (plural peasen), as in pease pudding. However, by analogy with other plurals ending in -s, speakers began construing pease as a plural and constructing the singular form by dropping the -s, giving the term pea. This process is known as back-formation.

== Cultivars ==
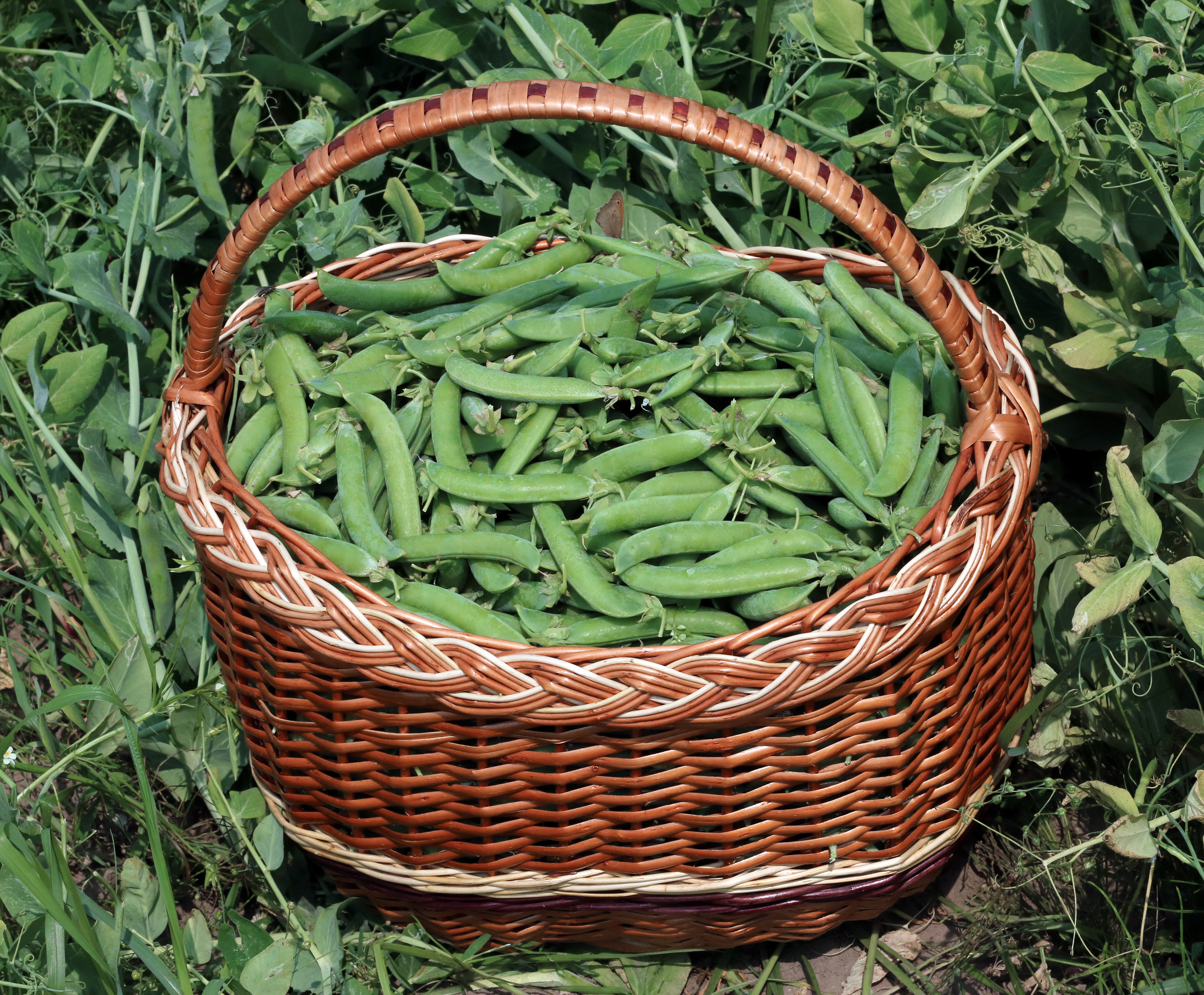
A basket of pea pods

=== Garden peas ===
There are many cultivars of garden peas. Some of the most common cultivars are listed here, with the number of days they require to reach maturity. PMR indicates some degree of powdery mildew resistance; afila types, also called semi-leafless, have clusters of tendrils instead of leaves. Unless otherwise noted these are so called dwarf cultivars which grow to an average height of about 1 m. Giving the vines support is recommended, but not required. Extra dwarf are suitable for container growing, reaching only about 25 cm. Tall cultivars grow to about 2 m with support required.

- Alaska, 55 days (smooth seeded)
- Tom Thumb / Half Pint, 55 days (heirloom, extra dwarf)
- Thomas Laxton (heirloom) / Laxton's Progress / Progress #9, 60–65 days
- Mr. Big, 60 days, 2000 AAS winner
- Little Marvel, 63 days, 1934 AAS winner
- Early Perfection, 65 days
- Kelvedon Wonder, 65 days, 1997 RHS AGM winner
- Sabre, 65 days, PMR
- Homesteader / Lincoln, 67 days (heirloom, known as Greenfeast in Australia and New Zealand)
- Miragreen, 68 days (tall climber)
- Serge, 68 days, PMR, afila
- Wando, 68 days
- Green Arrow, 70 days
- Recruit, 70 days, PMR, afila
- Tall Telephone / Alderman, 75 days (heirloom, tall climber)

=== Edible-pod peas ===
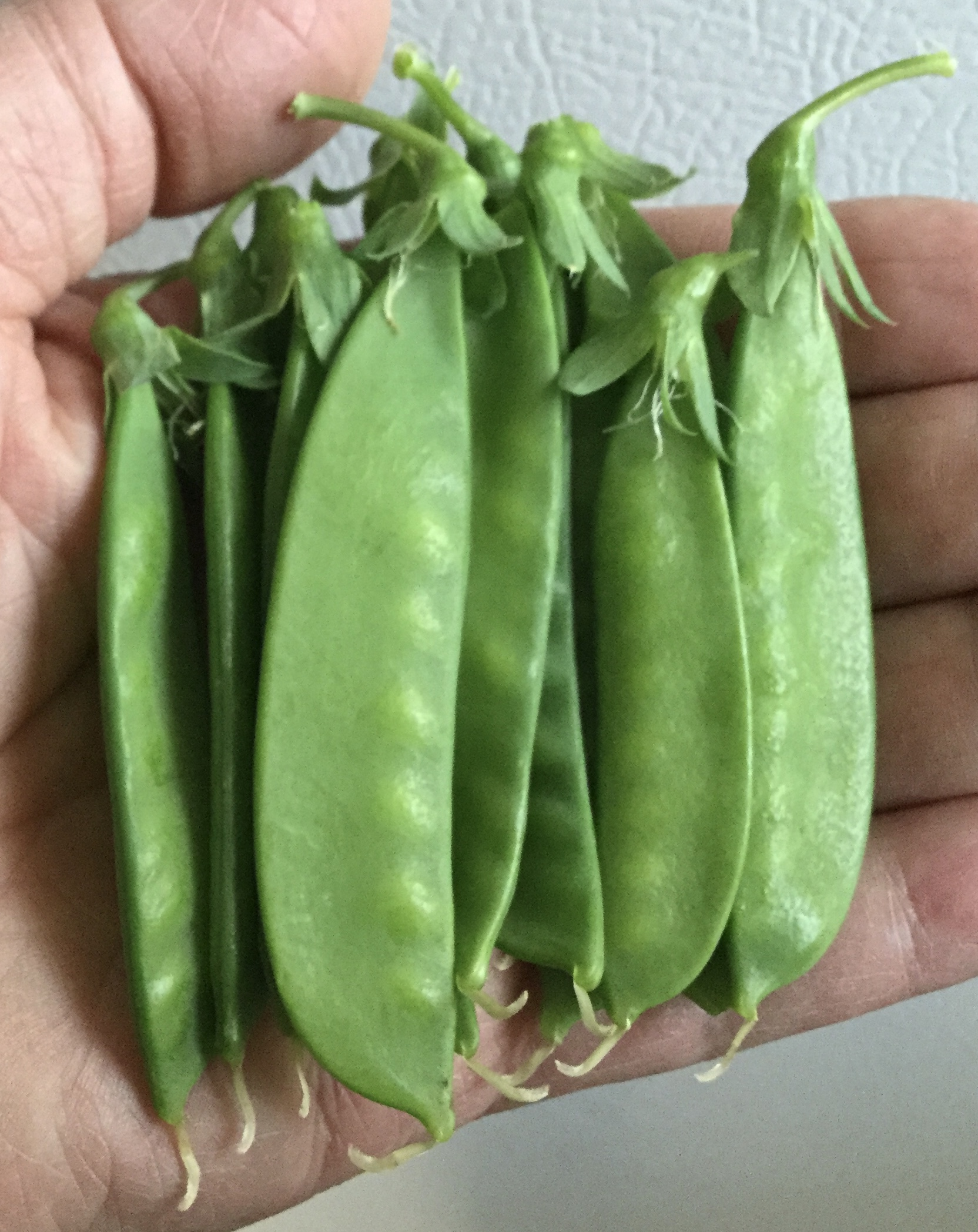
Handful of pea pods for a stir fry

Some peas lack the tough membrane inside the pod wall and have tender edible pods, allowing them to be eaten whole. There are two main types:

- Snow peas have flat pods with thin pod walls. Pods and seeds are eaten when they are very young.
- Snap peas (also known as sugar snap peas) have rounded pods with thick pod walls. Pods and seeds are eaten before maturity.

The name sugar pea can include both types or be synonymous with either snow peas or snap peas in different dictionaries. The term mangetout (/ˈmɒ̃ʒˌtuː/; from French: pois mange-tout, 'eat-all pea') is generally used in British English to refer to the snow pea specifically, but may also refer to a snap pea, especially when used in other contexts.

Snow peas and snap peas both belong to macrocarpon group, a cultivar group based on the variety Pisum sativum var. macrocarpum Ser. named in 1825. It was described as having very compressed non-leathery edible pods in the original publication.

=== Field peas ===
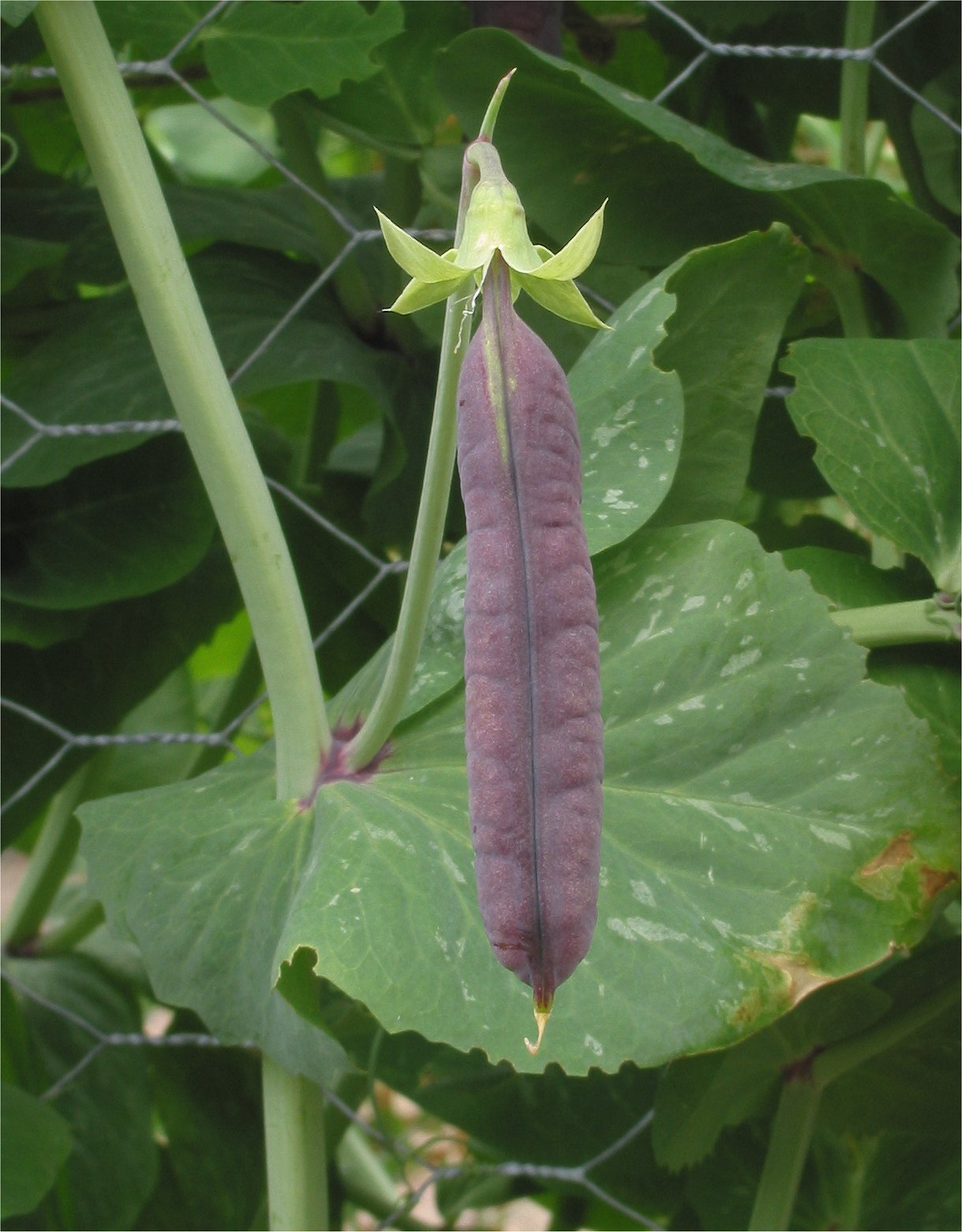
Pod 'Blue Schokker'

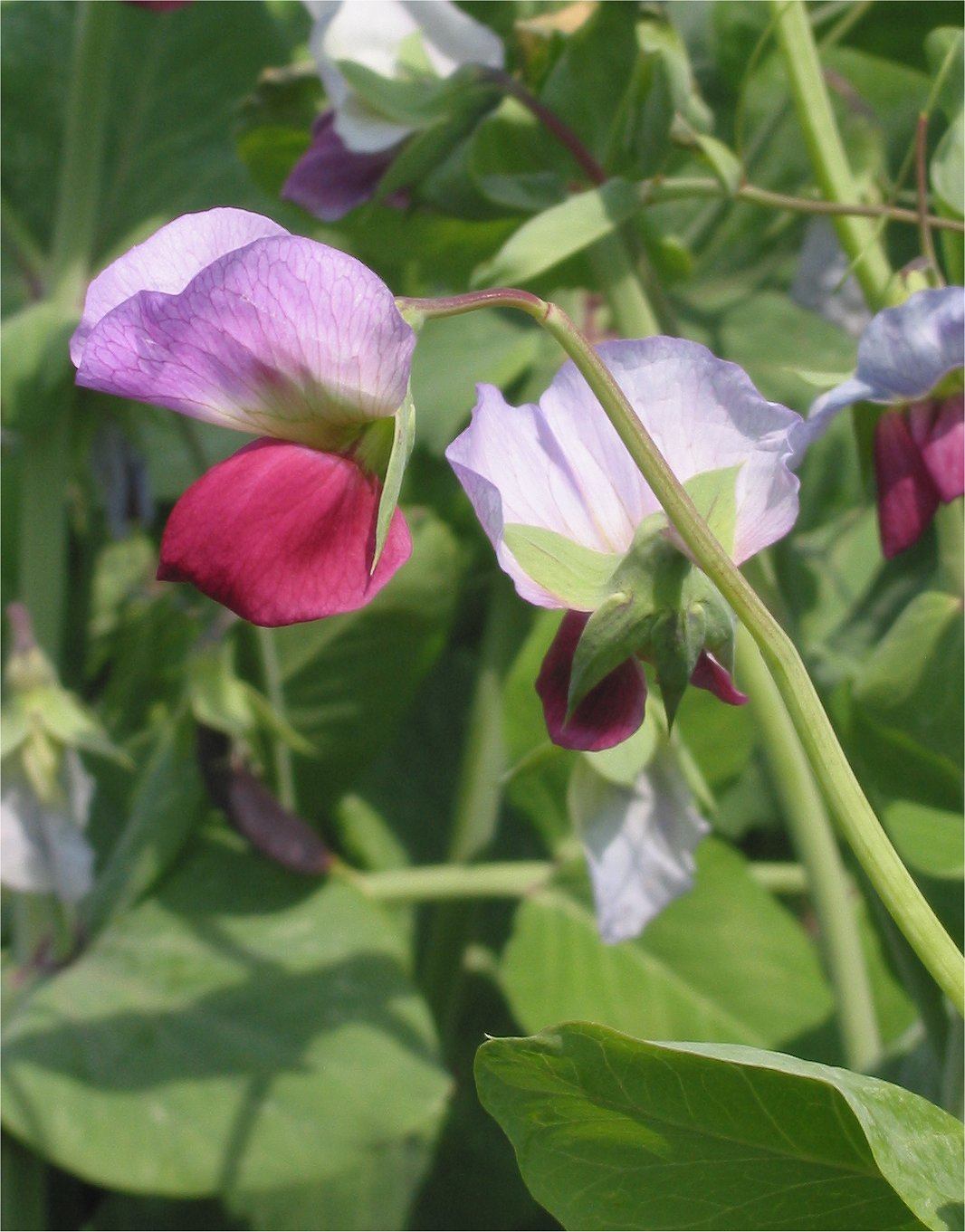
Field pea plant in bloom

The field pea is a type of pea sometimes called Pisum sativum subsp. arvense (L.) Asch. It is also known as dun (grey-brown) pea, Kapucijner pea, or Austrian winter pea, and is one of the oldest domesticated crops, cultivated for at least 7,000 years. Field peas are now grown in many countries for both human consumption and stockfeed. There are several cultivars and colours including blue, dun (brown), maple and white. This pea should not be confused with the cowpea (Vigna unguiculata) which is sometimes called the "field pea" in warmer climates.

It is a climbing annual legume with weak, viny, and relatively succulent stems. Vines often are 120–150 cm (4–5 ft) long, but when grown alone, field pea's weak stems prevent it from growing more than 45–60 cm (1 1/2–2 ft) tall. Leaves have two leaflets and a tendril. Flowers are white, pink, or purple. Pods carry seeds that are large (seed densities of 8,800/kg or 4,000/lb), nearly spherical, and white, gray, green, or brown. The root system is relatively shallow and small, but well nodulated.

The field pea is a cool-season legume crop that is grown on over 10 million hectares (25 million acres) worldwide. It has been an important grain legume crop for millennia, seeds showing domesticated characteristics dating from at least 7,000 years ago have been found in archaeological sites around what is now Turkey. Field peas or "dry peas" are marketed as a dry, shelled product for either human or livestock food, unlike the garden pea, which is marketed as a fresh or canned vegetable. The major producing countries of field peas are Russia and China, followed by Canada, Europe, Australia and the United States. Europe, Australia, Canada and the U.S. raise over 1.8 million hectares (4.4 million acres) and are major exporters of peas. In 2002, there were approximately 120,000 hectares (300,000 acres) of field peas grown in the U.S.

== Distribution and habitat ==
The wild pea is restricted to the Mediterranean Basin and the Near East. The earliest archaeological finds of peas date from about 10'000 B.C. Near East and Central Asia. In Egypt, early finds date from c. 4800–4400 BC in the Nile Delta area, and from c. 3800–3600 BC in Upper Egypt. In northern Europe, specifically Fennoscandia, findings of pea data back to 4000 BC. The pea was also present in Georgia in the 5th millennium BC. Farther east, the finds are younger. Peas were present in Afghanistan c. 2000 BC, in Harappan civilization around modern-day Pakistan and western- and northwestern India in 2250–1750 BC. In the second half of the 2nd millennium BC, this legume crop appears in the Ganges Basin and southern India.

== Cultivation ==
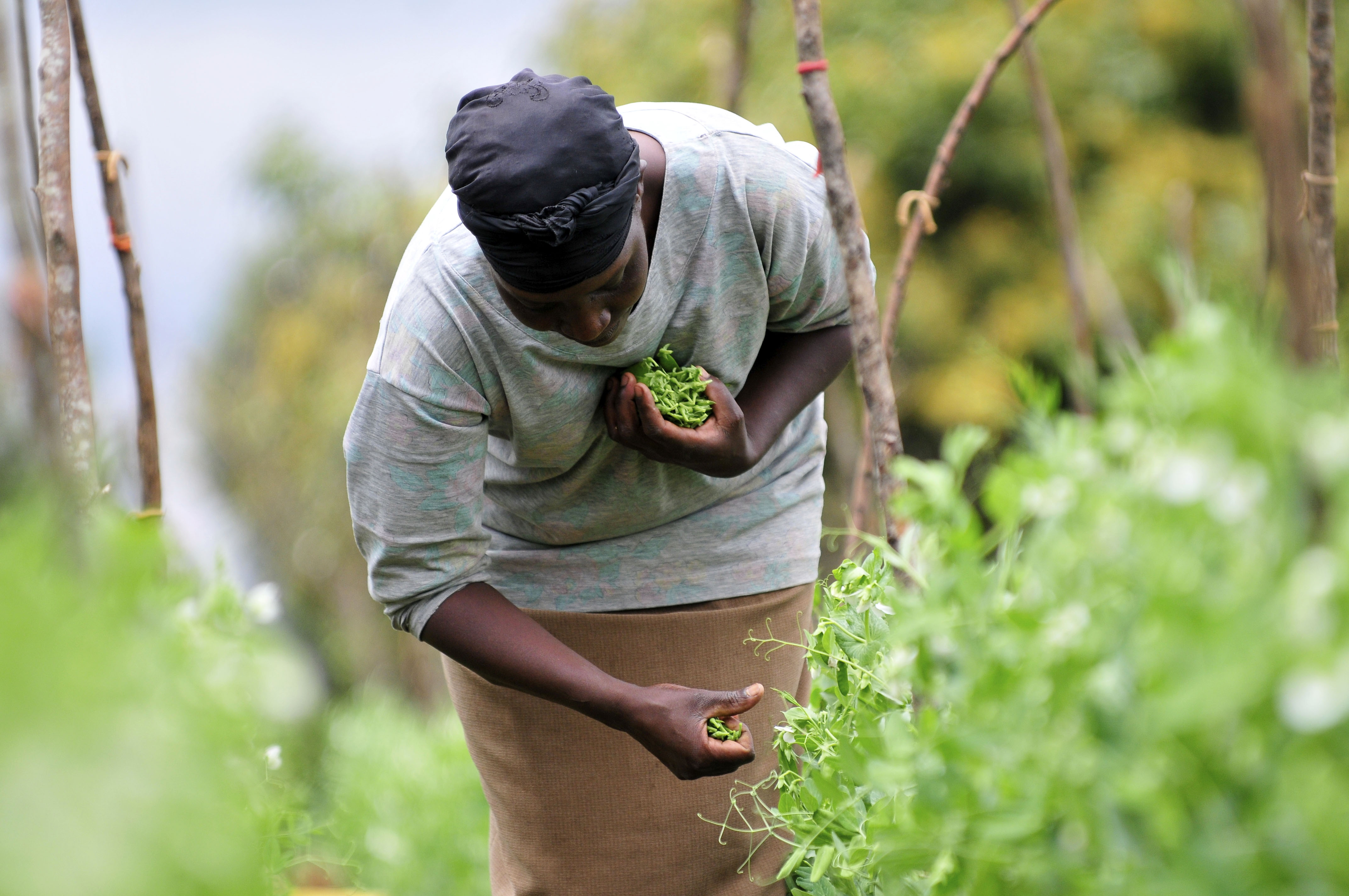
Woman picking peas in Mount Kenya region

=== History ===
In early times, peas were grown mostly for their dry seeds. From plants growing wild in the Mediterranean Basin, constant selection since the Neolithic dawn of agriculture improved their yield.

Peas are mentioned in Aristophanes's The Birds. The Greeks and Romans were cultivating this legume from around 500 BC to 400 BC, with vendors in the streets of Athens selling hot pea soup.

In the early 3rd century BC, Theophrastus mentions peas among the legumes that are sown late in the winter because of their tenderness.

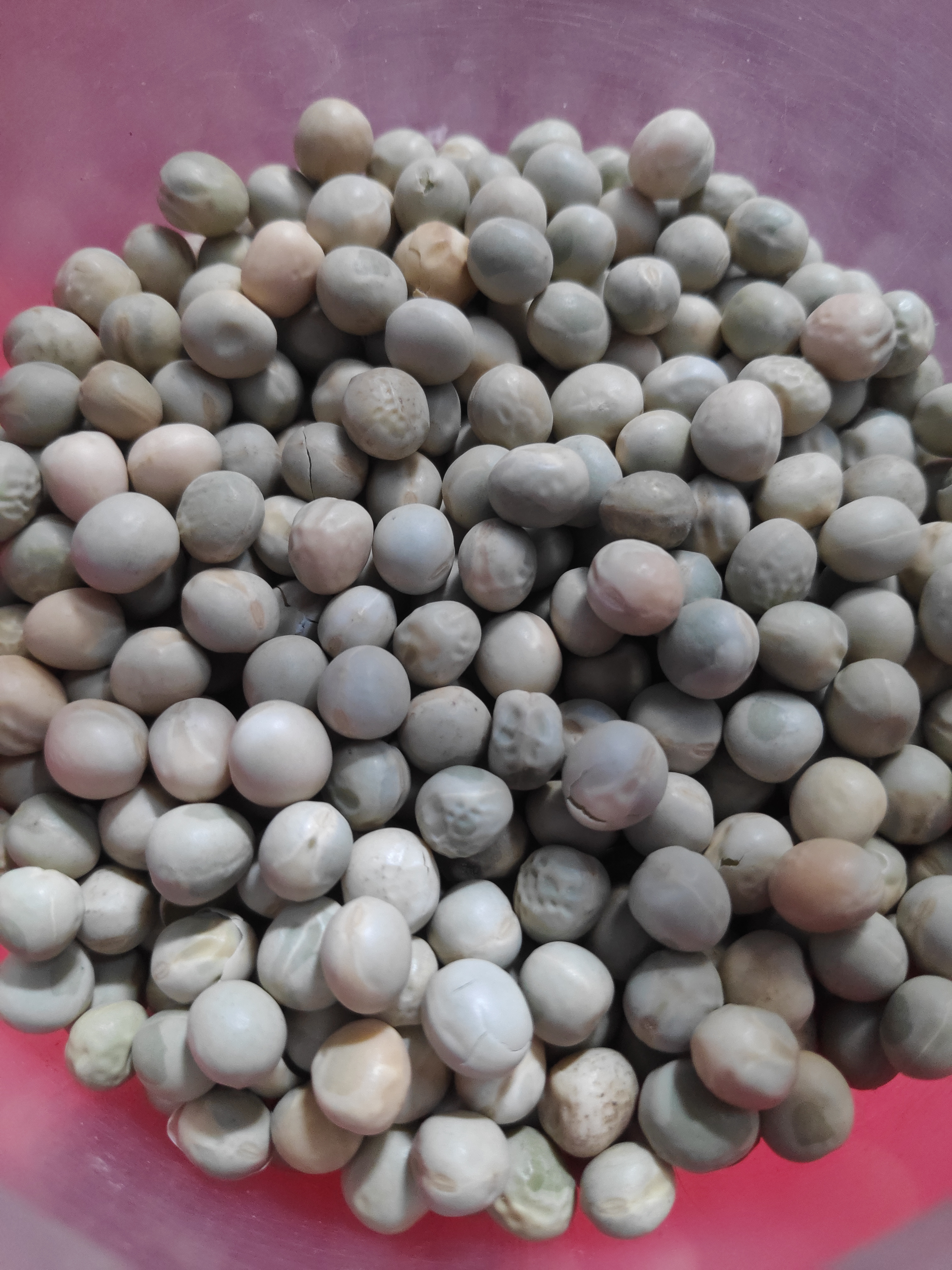
Dried green peas

In the first and second centuries BC, Cato the Elder and Varro both mention peas in their respective works De agri cultura and De re rustica. It is also mentioned frequently in de re coquinaria by Apicius and occurs in many different recipes.

In the Middle Ages, field peas are constantly mentioned, as they were the staple that kept famine at bay, as Charles the Good, count of Flanders, noted explicitly in 1124.

Green "garden" peas, eaten immature and fresh, were an innovative luxury of Early Modern Europe. In England, the distinction between field peas and garden peas dates from the early 17th century: John Gerard and John Parkinson both mention garden peas. Snow and snap peas, which the French called mange-tout, because they were eaten pods and all, were introduced to France from the market gardens of Holland in the time of Henri IV, through the French ambassador. Green peas were introduced from Genoa to the court of Louis XIV in January 1660, with some staged fanfare. A hamper of them was presented before the King. They were shelled by the Savoyan comte de Soissons, who had married a niece of Cardinal Mazarin. Little dishes of peas were then presented to the King, the Queen, Cardinal Mazarin and Monsieur, the king's brother. Immediately established and grown for earliness warmed with manure and protected under glass, they were still a luxurious delicacy in 1696, when Mme de Maintenon and Mme de Sevigné each reported that they were "a fashion, a fury".

The first sweet tasting pea was developed in the 18th century by amateur plant breeder Thomas Edward Knight of Downton, near Salisbury, England. Modern split peas, with their indigestible skins rubbed off, are a development of the later 19th century. The first pea harvesting machine ("pea viner") able to shell peas through impact was invented around 1890 by John Alexander Chisholm.

=== Harvesting ===
Large-scale commercial harvesting of peas without edible pods can be accomplished using specialised pea harvester machines (also called pea viners) that strip them from their vines.

By contrast, the two edible-pod pea cultivars (snow peas and snap peas) are still usually picked by hand. A prototype for an automated snap pea harvester was being researched in 2017.

=== Grading ===
Pea grading involves sorting peas by size, in which the smallest peas are graded as the highest quality for their tenderness. Brines may be used, in which peas are floated, from which their density can be determined.

=== Pests and diseases ===
A variety of diseases affect peas through a number of pathogens, including insects, viruses, bacteria and fungi. In particular, virus disease of peas has worldwide economic importance. Additionally, the diseases limiting to global yield potential of pea are members of the pea root rot complex.

Additionally, insects such as the pea leaf weevil (Sitona lineatus) can damage peas and other pod fruits. The pea leaf weevil is native to Europe, but has spread to other places such as Alberta, Canada. They are about 3.5–5.5 mm (9/64–7/32 in) long and are distinguishable by three light-coloured stripes running length-wise down the thorax. The weevil larvae feed on the root nodules of pea plants, which are essential to the plants' supply of nitrogen, and thus diminish leaf and stem growth. Adult weevils feed on the leaves and create a notched, "c-shaped" appearance on the outside of the leaves.

Delia platura, also known as the seed corn maggot, is another pest of peas that can cause damage to germinating seeds and seedlings.

The pea moth can be a serious pest producing caterpillars that resemble small white maggots in the pea pods. The caterpillars eat the developing peas making them unsightly and unsuitable for culinary use. Prior to the use of modern insecticides, pea moth caterpillars were a very common sight in pea pods.

== Production ==
Green pea production 2023, tonnes
China	11,821,097
India	6,592,000
Pakistan	401,866
France	268,200
United States	237,270
Algeria	211,552
United Kingdom	155,616
World	21,484,769
Source: FAOSTAT of the United Nations

In 2023, world production of green peas was 21.5 million tonnes, led by China and India with 86% of the total when combined (table).

Pea production (dry)

Pea yields (dry)

Production of green peas

Green pea yield

== Adverse effects ==
Some people experience allergic reactions to peas, with vicilin or convicilin as the most common allergens.

Peas, green, raw (fresh)
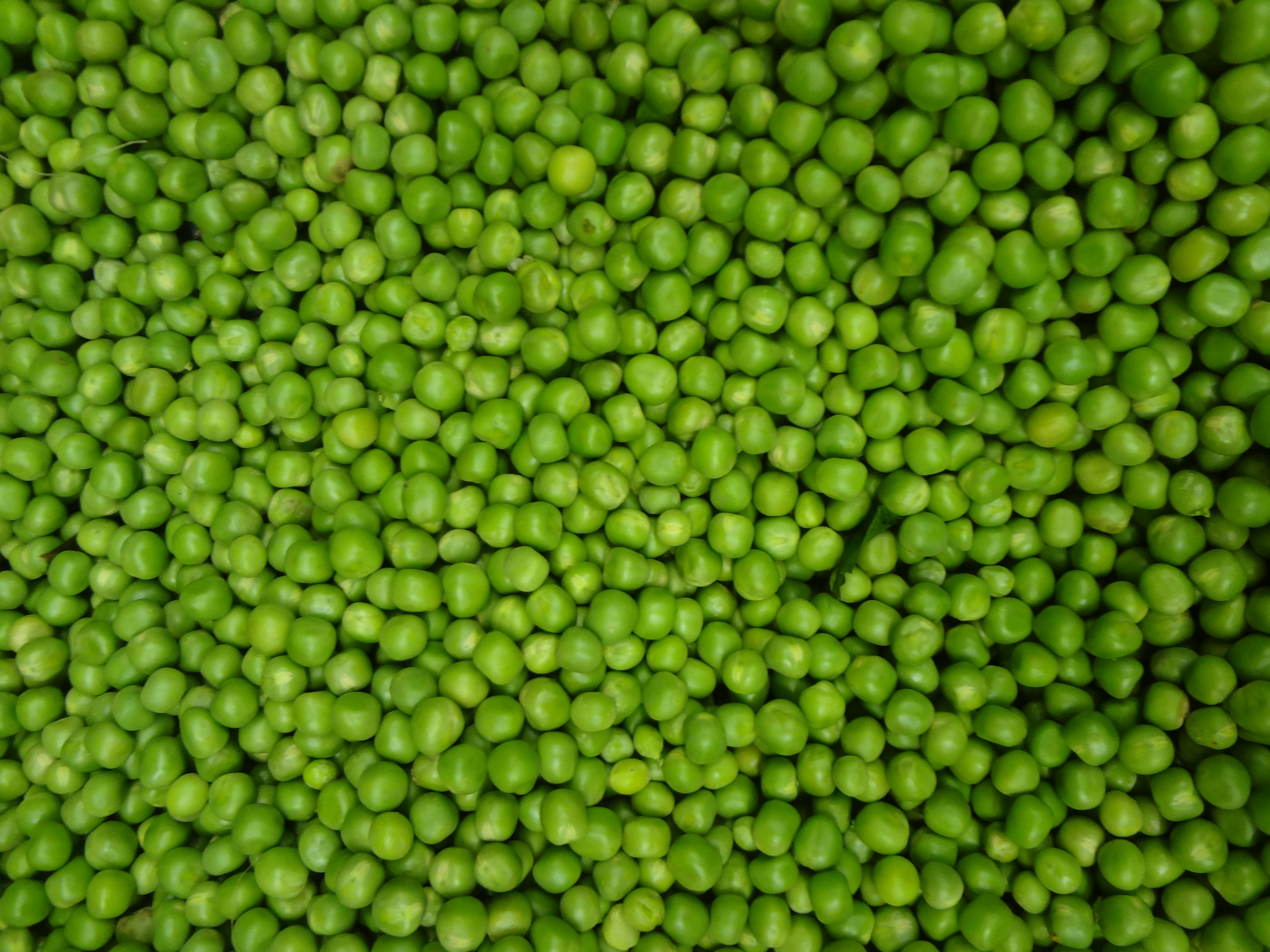

Nutritional value per 100 g (3.5 oz)
- Energy: 339 kJ (81 kcal)
- Carbohydrates: 14.45 g
- Sugars: 5.67 g
- Dietary fibre: 5.1 g
- Fat: 0.4 g
- Protein: 5.42 g
Vitamins and minerals
Vitamins	Quantity %DV^{†}
Vitamin A equiv. beta-Carotene lutein zeaxanthin	4% 38 μg 4% 449 μg 2477 μg
Thiamine (B1)	22% 0.266 mg
Riboflavin (B2)	10% 0.132 mg
Niacin (B3)	13% 2.09 mg
Vitamin B6	10% 0.169 mg
Folate (B9)	16% 65 μg
Vitamin C	44% 40 mg
Vitamin E	1% 0.13 mg
Vitamin K	21% 24.8 μg
Minerals	Quantity %DV^{†}
Calcium	2% 25 mg
Iron	8% 1.47 mg
Magnesium	8% 33 mg
Manganese	18% 0.41 mg
Phosphorus	9% 108 mg
Potassium	8% 244 mg
Sodium	0% 5 mg
Zinc	11% 1.24 mg
- Other constituents: Quantity
- Water: 79 g
- Link to USDA Database entry
- ^{†}Percentages estimated using US recommendations for adults, except for potassium, which is estimated based on expert recommendation from the National Academies.

== Uses ==
=== Nutrition ===
Raw green peas are 79% water, 14% carbohydrates, 5% protein, and contain negligible fat. In a reference amount of 100 grams (3 1/2 ounces), raw green peas supply 339 kilojoules (81 kilocalories) of food energy, and are a rich source (20% or more of the Daily Value, DV) of vitamin C, vitamin K, and thiamine, with several B vitamins and dietary minerals in moderate amounts (10–18% DV) (table).

=== Culinary ===
Yearly per capita supply of dry peas

In modern times peas are usually boiled or steamed, which breaks down the cell walls and makes them taste sweeter and the nutrients more bioavailable. Along with broad beans and lentils, these formed an important part of the diet of most people in the Middle East, North Africa and Europe during the Middle Ages. By the 17th and 18th centuries, it had become popular to eat peas "green", that is, while they are immature and right after they are picked. New cultivars of peas were developed by the English during this time, which became known as "garden" or "English" peas. The popularity of green peas spread to North America. Thomas Jefferson grew more than 30 cultivars of peas on his estate. With the invention of canning, peas were one of the first vegetables to be canned.

Fresh peas are often eaten boiled and flavoured with butter or spearmint as a side dish vegetable. Salt and pepper are also commonly added to peas when served. Fresh peas are also used in pot pies, salads and casseroles. Pod peas (snow peas and snap peas) are used in stir-fried dishes, particularly those in American Chinese cuisine. Pea pods do not keep well once picked, and if not used quickly, are best preserved by drying, canning or freezing within a few hours of harvest.

Dried peas are often made into a soup or simply eaten on their own. In Japan, China, Taiwan and some Southeast Asian countries, including Thailand, the Philippines and Malaysia, peas are roasted and salted, and eaten as snacks. In the Philippines, peas, while still in their pods, are a common ingredient in viands and pansit. In the UK, dried yellow or green split peas are used to make pease pudding (or "pease porridge"), a traditional dish. In North America, a similarly traditional dish is split pea soup.

Pea soup is eaten in many other parts of the world, including northern Europe, parts of middle Europe, Russia, Iran, Iraq and India.

In India, fresh peas are used in various dishes such as aloo matar (curried potatoes with peas) or mattar paneer (paneer cheese with peas), though they can be substituted with frozen peas as well. Peas are also eaten raw, as they are sweet when fresh off the bush. Green peas known as hasiru batani in Kannada are used to make curry and gasi. Split peas are also used to make dal, particularly in Guyana, and Trinidad, where there is a significant population of Indians.

In Chinese cuisine, the tender new growth (leaves and stem) dou miao (pea shoots, 豆苗; dòu miáo) are commonly used in stir-fries. Much like picking the leaves for tea, the farmers pick the tips off of the pea plant.

In Greece, Tunisia, Turkey, Cyprus, and other parts of the Mediterranean, peas are made into a stew with lamb and potatoes.

In Hungary and Serbia, pea soup is often served with dumplings and spiced with hot paprika.

In the United Kingdom, dried, rehydrated and mashed marrowfat peas, or cooked green split peas, known as mushy peas, are popular, originally in the north of England, but now ubiquitously, and especially as an accompaniment to fish and chips or meat pies, particularly in fish and chip shops. Sodium bicarbonate is sometimes added to soften the peas. In 2005, a poll of 2,000 people revealed the pea to be Britain's seventh favourite culinary vegetable.

Processed peas are mature peas which have been dried, soaked and then heat treated (processed) to prevent spoilage, in the same manner as pasteurising. Cooked peas are sometimes sold dried and coated with wasabi, salt, or other spices.

In North America pea milk is produced and sold as an alternative to cow milk for a variety of reasons.

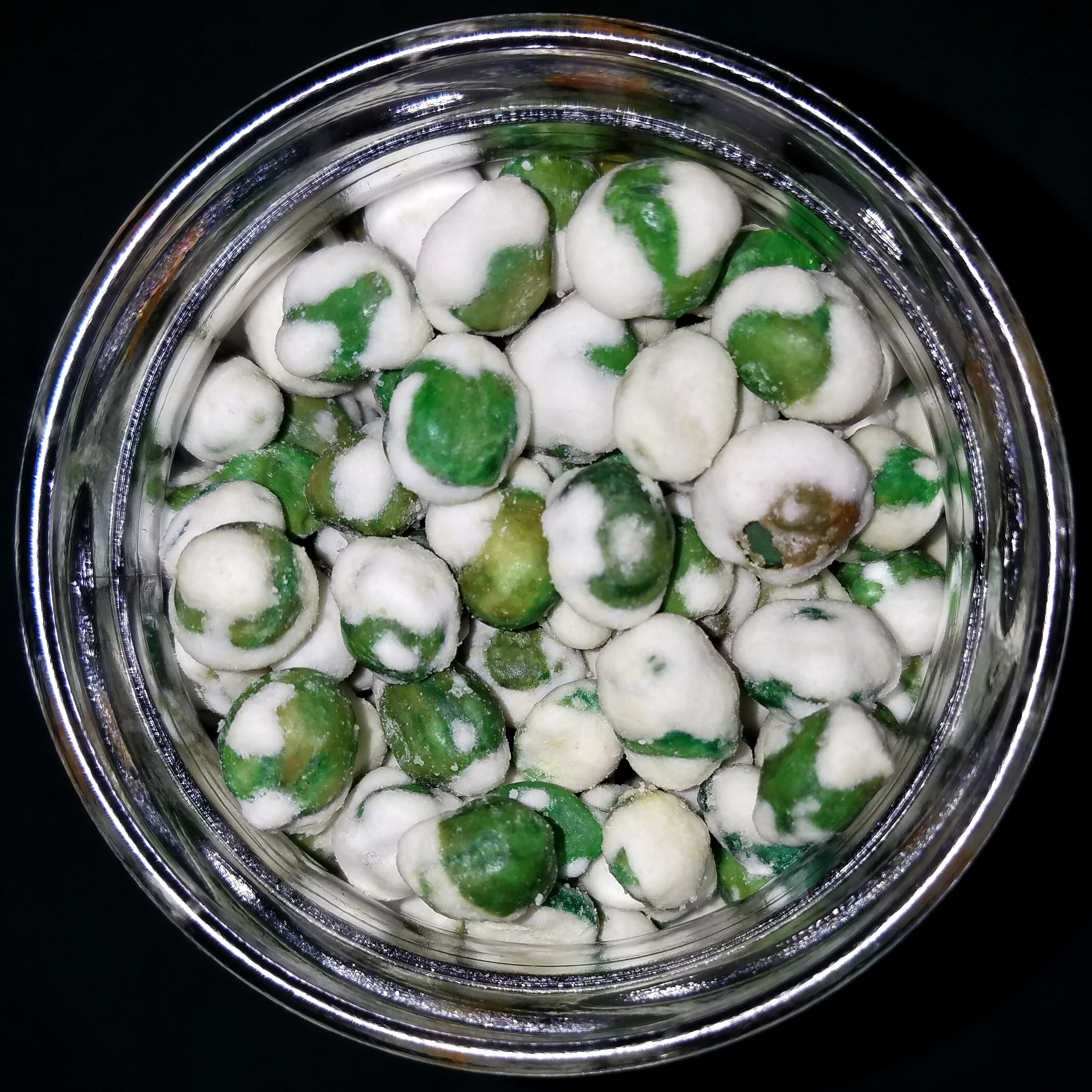
Wasabi peas

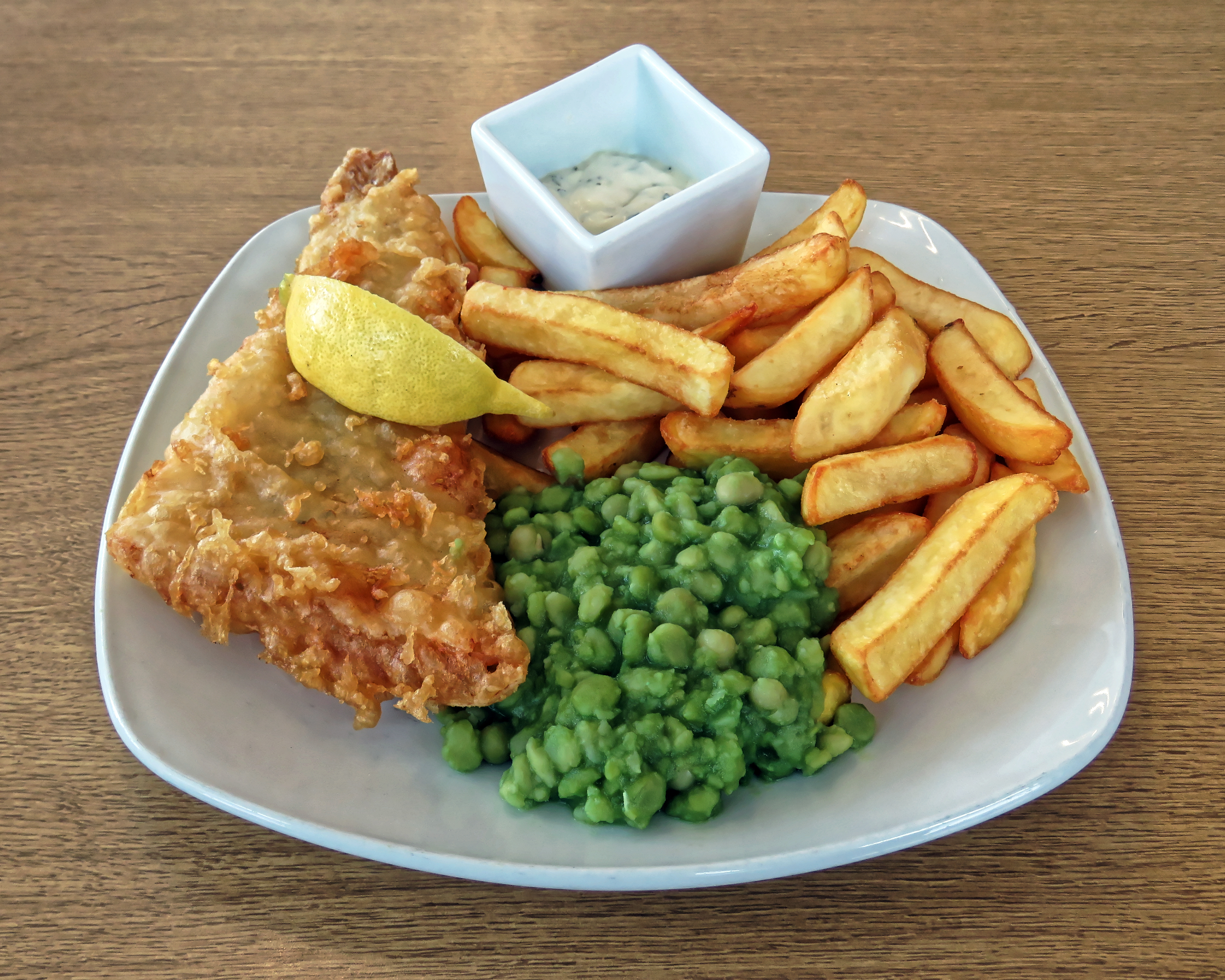
Fish and chips with peas

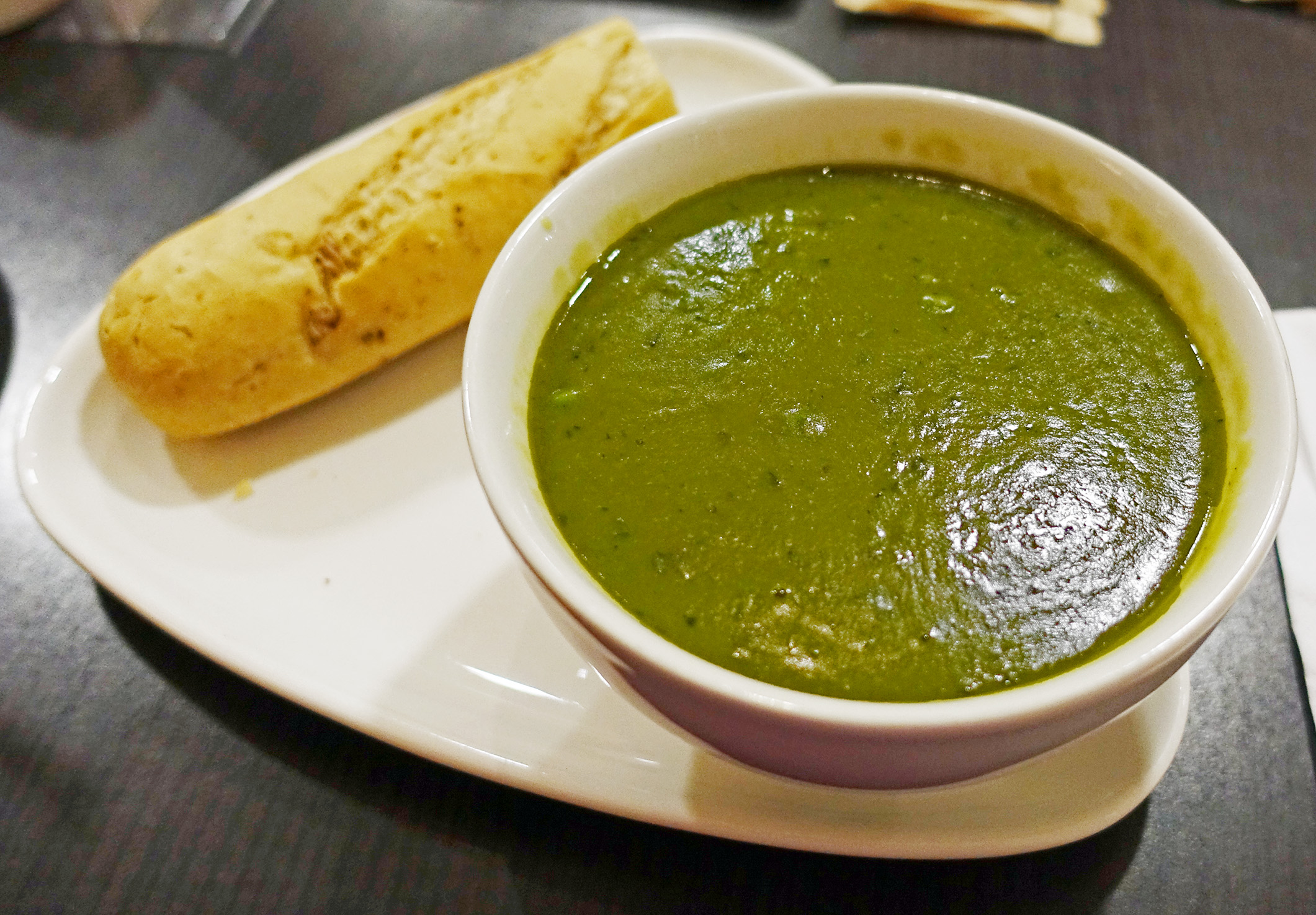
Pea soup

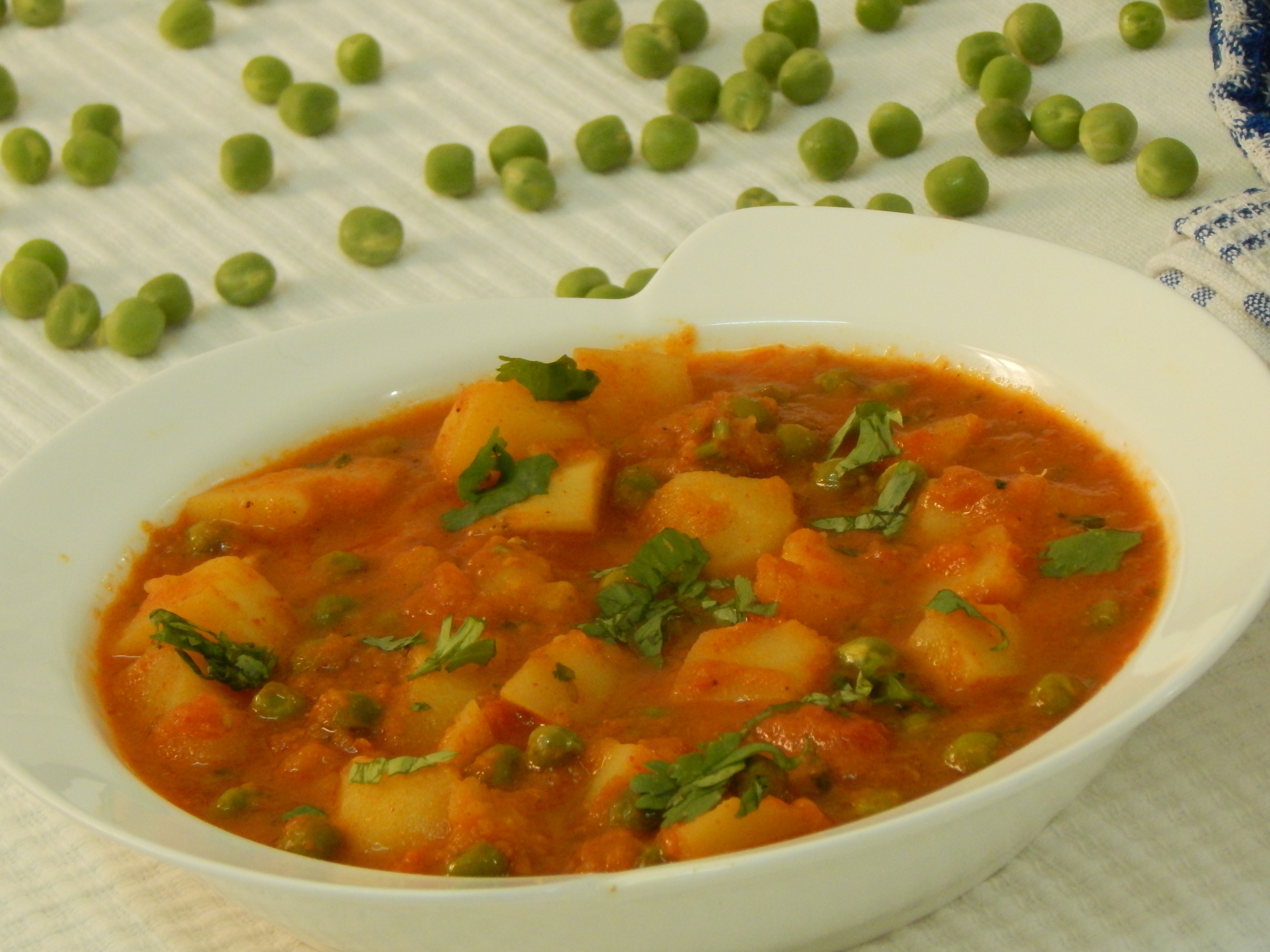
Aloo mutter

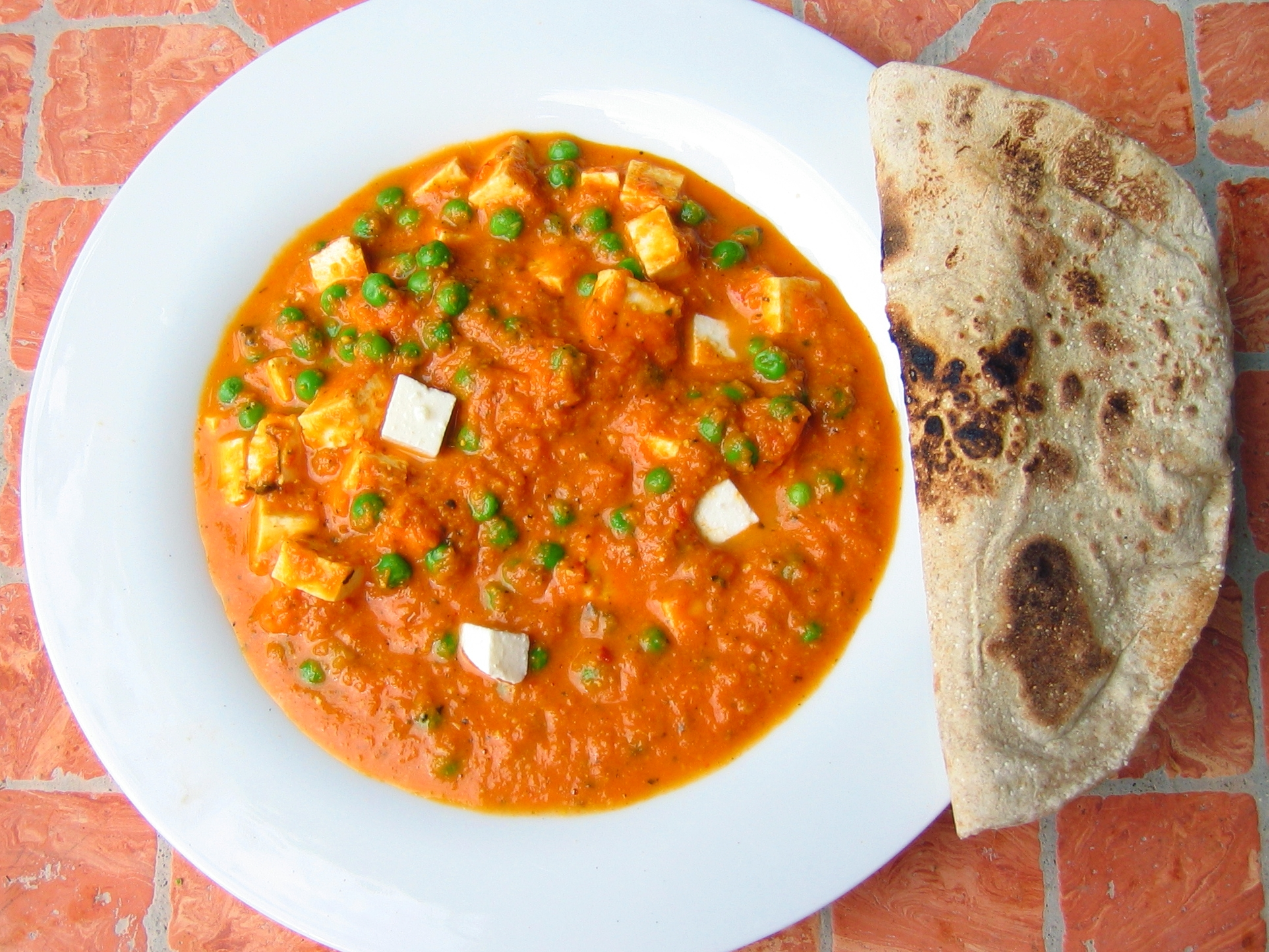
Matar paneer with chapati

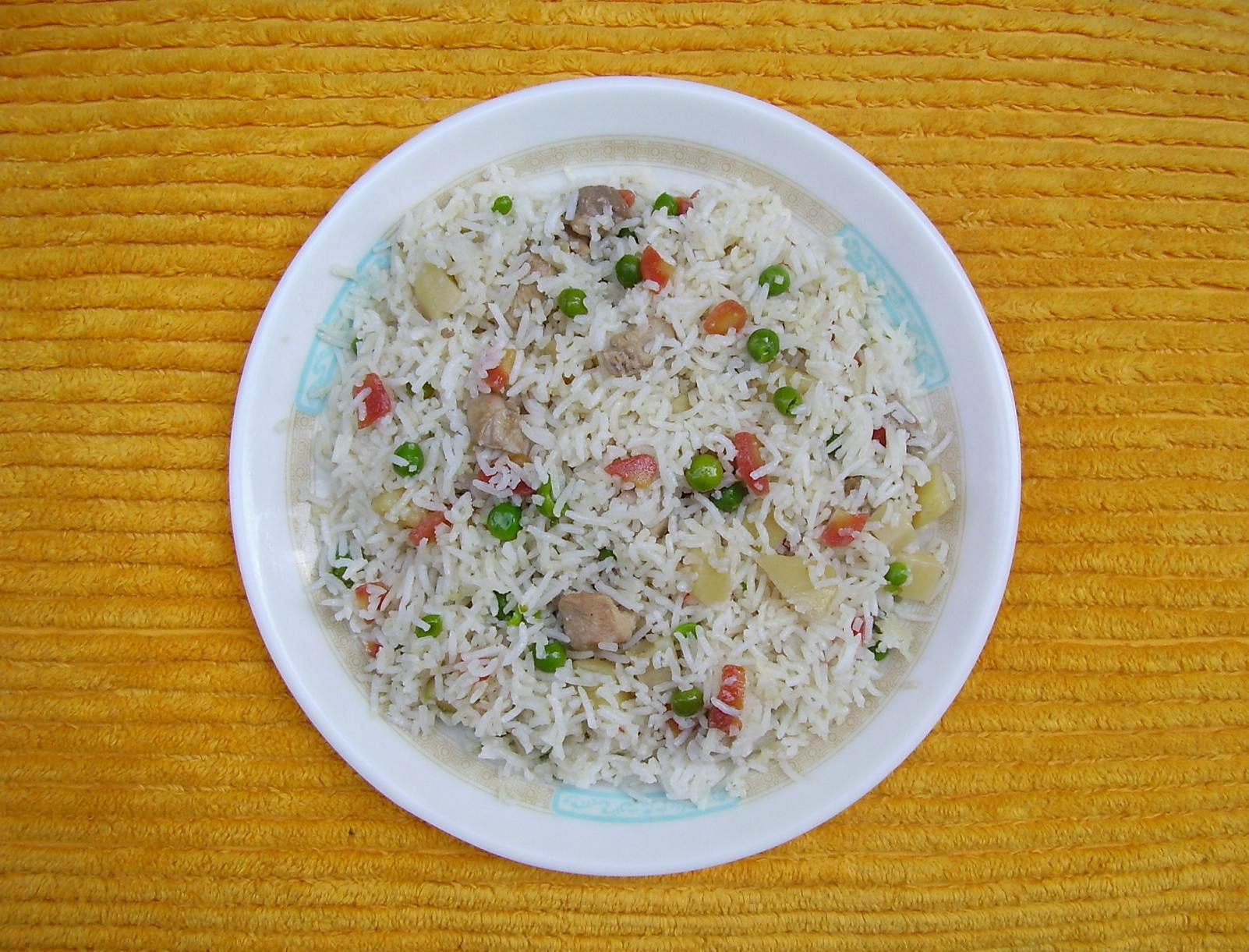
Peas in fried rice

=== Pea sprouts ===
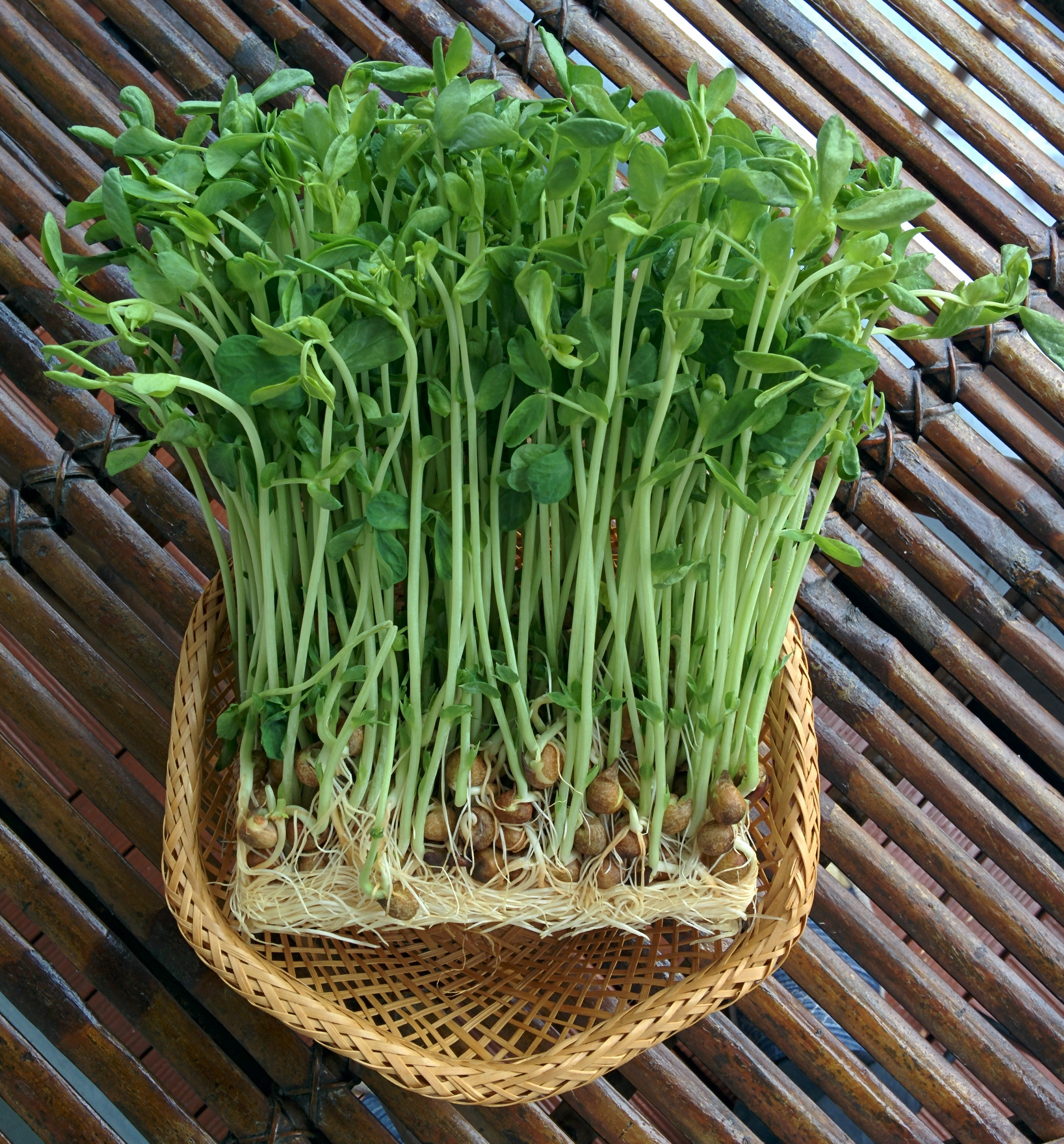
Pea sprouts

In East Asia, pea sprouts or shoots (豆苗; 완두순) were once dedicated cuisine when the plant was less highly available. Today, when the plant can be easily grown, fresh pea shoots are available in supermarkets or may be grown at home.

=== Manufacturing ===
==== Frozen peas ====
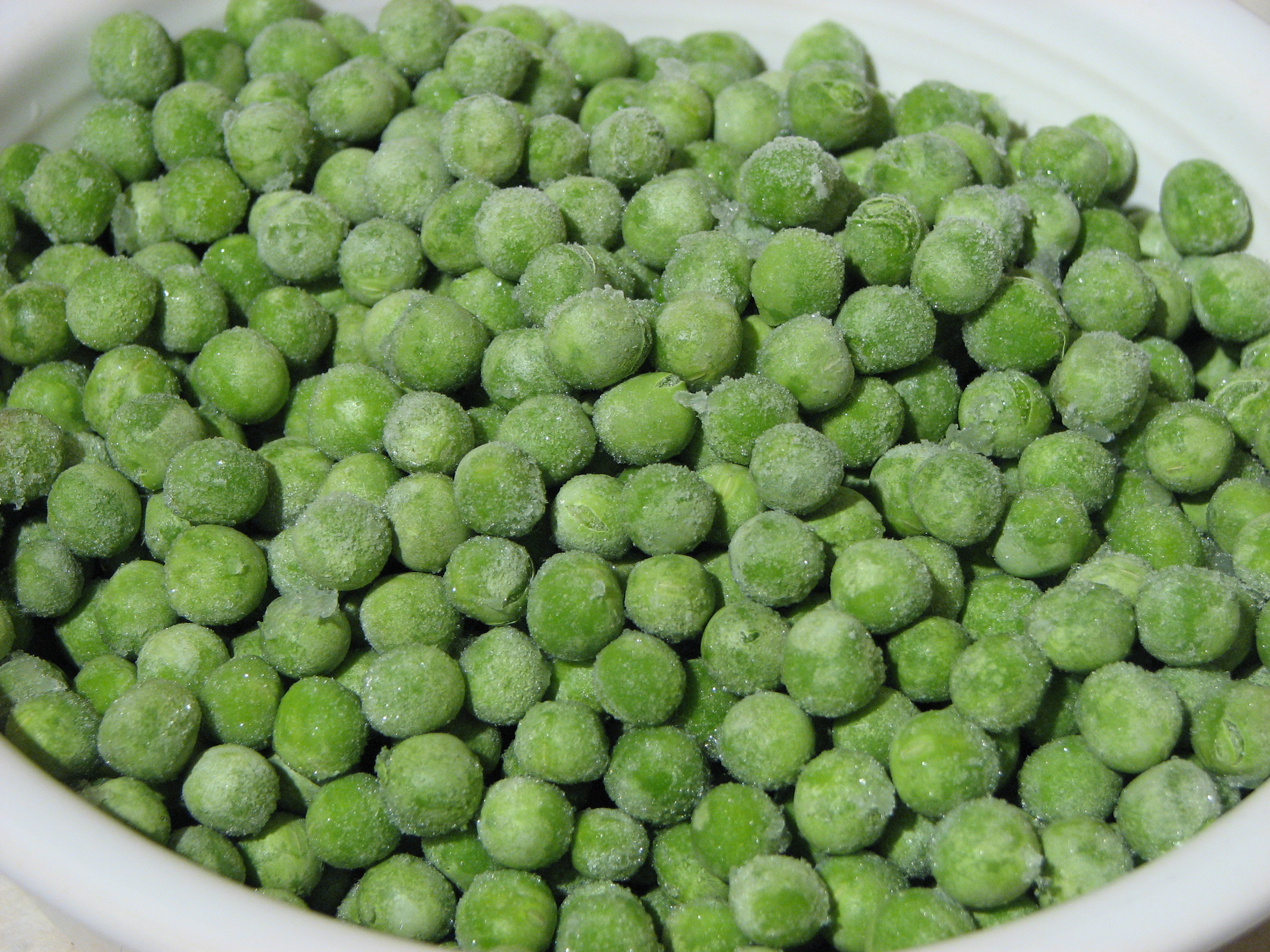
Frozen green peas

In order to freeze and preserve peas, they must first be grown, picked, and shelled. Usually, the more tender the peas are, the more likely that they will be used in the final product. The peas must be put through the process of freezing shortly after being picked so that they do not spoil too soon. Once the peas have been selected, they are placed in ice water and allowed to cool. After, they are sprayed with water to remove any residual dirt or dust that may remain on them. The next step is blanching. The peas are boiled for a few minutes to remove any enzymes that may shorten their shelf life. They are then cooled and removed from the water. The final step is the actual freezing to produce the final product. This step may vary considerably; some companies freeze their peas by air blast freezing, where the vegetables are put through a tunnel at high speeds and frozen by cold air. Finally, the peas are packaged and shipped out for retail sale.

=== Science ===
In the mid-19th century, Austrian monk Gregor Mendel's observations of pea pods led to the principles of Mendelian genetics, the foundation of modern genetics. He ended up growing and examining about 28,000 pea plants in the course of his experiments.

Mendel chose peas for his experiments because he could grow them easily, pure-bred strains were readily available, and the structure of the flowers protect them from cross-pollination, and cross pollination was easy. Mendel cross-bred tall and dwarf pea plants, green and yellow peas, purple and white flowers, wrinkled and smooth peas, and a few other traits. He then observed the resulting offspring. In each of these cases, one trait is dominant and all the offspring, or Filial-1 (abbreviated F_{1}) generation, showed the dominant trait. Then he allowed the F_{1} generation to self pollinate and observed their offspring, the Filial-2 (abbreviated F_{2}) generation. The F_{2} plants had the dominant trait in approximately a 3:1 ratio. He studied later generations of self pollinated plants, and performed crosses to determine the nature of the pollen and egg cells.

Mendel reasoned that each parent had a 'vote' in the appearance of the offspring, and the non-dominant, or recessive, trait appeared only when it was inherited from both parents. He did further experiments that showed each trait is separately inherited. Unwittingly, Mendel had solved a major problem with Charles Darwin's theory of evolution: how new traits were preserved and not blended back into the population, a question Darwin himself did not answer. Mendel's work was published in an obscure Austrian journal and was not rediscovered until about 1900.

=== Nitrogen fixation ===
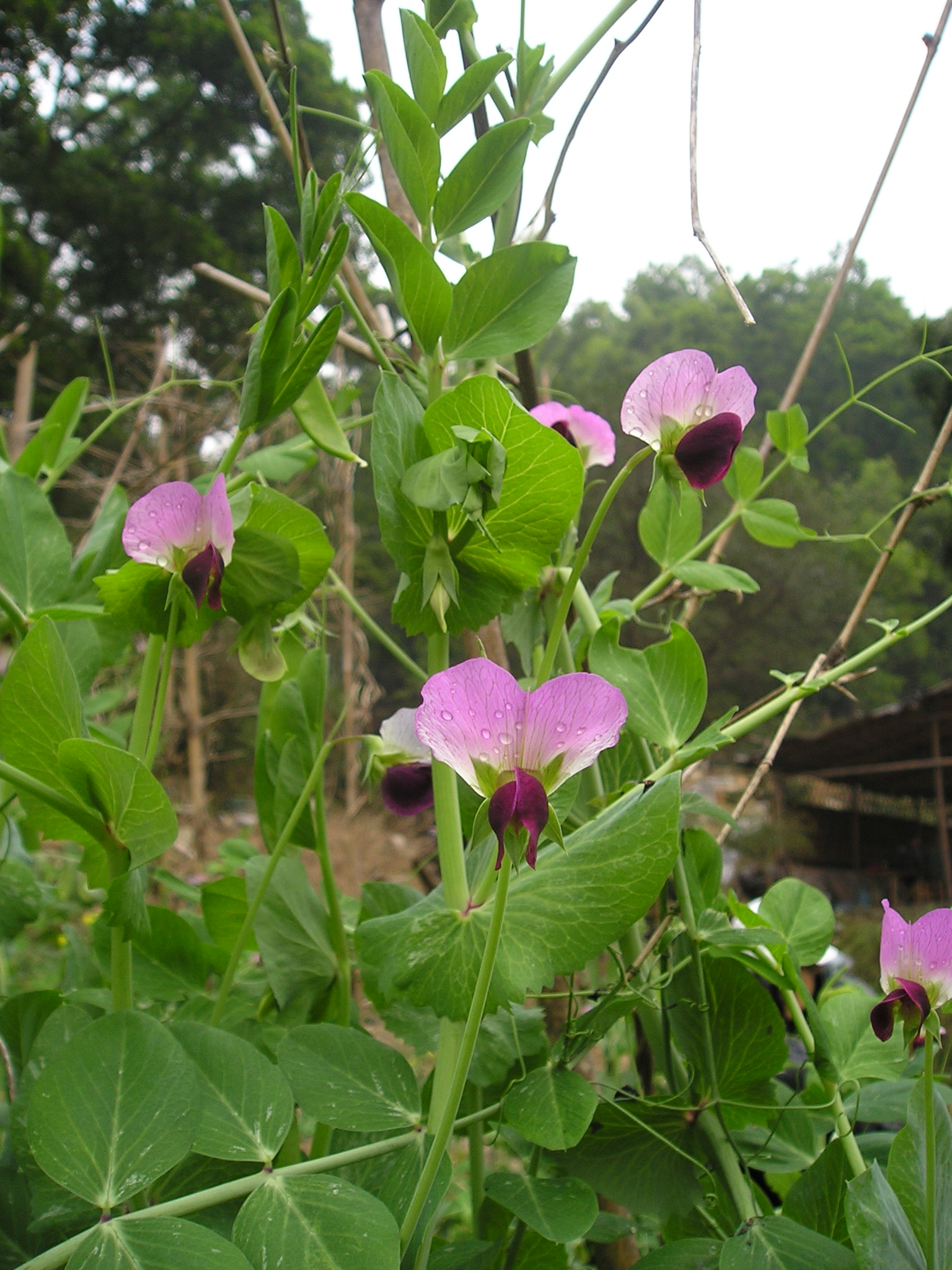
Pea flowers

Peas, like many legumes, contain symbiotic bacteria called Rhizobia within root nodules of their root systems. These bacteria have the special ability to fix nitrogen from atmospheric, molecular nitrogen (N_{2}) into ammonia (NH_{3}). The chemical reaction is:

N_{2} + 8H^{+} + 8e^{−} → 2NH_{3} + H_{2}

Ammonia is then converted to another form, ammonium (NH^{+}_{4}), usable by (some) plants, by the following reaction:

NH_{3} + H^{+} → NH^{+}_{4}

The root nodules of peas and other legumes are sources of nitrogen that they can use to make amino acids, constituents of proteins. Hence, legumes are good sources of plant protein.

When a pea plant dies in the field, for example following the harvest, all of its remaining nitrogen, incorporated into amino acids inside the remaining plant parts, is released back into the soil. In the soil, the amino acids are converted to nitrate (NO^{−}_{3}), that is available to other plants, thereby serving as fertiliser for future crops.

== See also ==
- Black-eyed pea
- Black pea
- Chickpea
- Cowpea
- Dixie lee pea
- Snap pea
- Snow pea
- Sweet pea
- Pea moth

== Bibliography ==
- European Association for Grain Legume Research (AEP). Pea. https://web.archive.org/web/20061017214408/http://www.grainlegumes.com/default.asp?id_biblio=52 .
- Hernández Bermejo, J. E. & León, J., (1992). Neglected crops: 1492 from a different perspective, Food and Agricultural Organization of the United Nations (FAO) Contents
- Muehlbauer, F. J. and Tullu, A., (1997). Pisum sativum L. Purdue University. Pea
- Oelke, E. A., Oplinger E. S., et al. (1991). Dry Field Pea. University of Wisconsin.Dry Field Pea
- Bitting, A.W. (1909). The Canning of Peas: Based on Factory Inspection and Experimental Data. Bulletin (United States. Bureau of Chemistry). U.S. Government Printing Office.
