= Pea shoots =

Immature tips of the pea plant

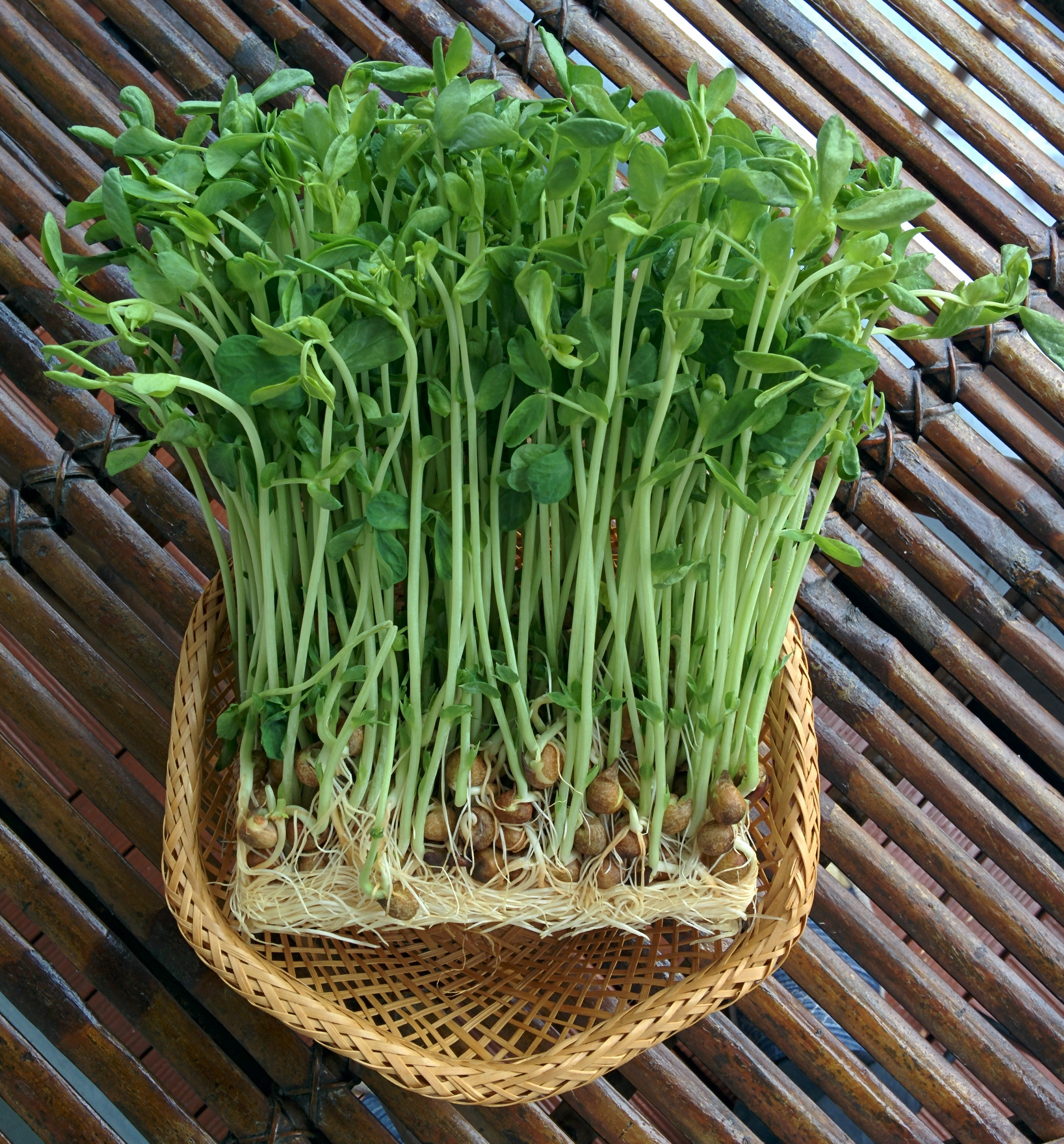
Pea shoots

Pea shoots or pea sprouts are the tender, immature tips of the pea plant, cultivated as a leaf vegetable to be eaten. Their flavor is described as being nutty and spinach-like. Pea shoots are generally believed to have been first cooked with and introduced by the Indigenous Hmong people in China, Japan, and Southeast Asia. Over the last couple of decades, pea shoots have gained popularity in the United States, being increasingly featured in Chinese and fine dining restaurants.

== Description ==
As a winter crop, pea shoots grow best in cool weather and are best planted in early spring or late summer. The shoots are 2–6 inches long (5–15 centimeters) and their thin stems hold 2–4 leaves and immature tendrils. There are two types of leaves that develop while the plant grows. The first one, known as cotyledons, have a sweeter and lighter flavor and are the first to appear. The true leaves that appear later connect to create a slender, light green, and crunchy stem.

== Names ==
Pea shoots are the translation of dou miao (豆苗) in Mandarin or dau miu in Cantonese. Dou (豆) means bean or pea, and miao (苗) means sprout or shoot. It is known as tōmyō in Japanese and sitsaro talbos in Tagalog. In English, the following names are used interchangeably: pea shoots, pea tips, pea vines, and pea stems.

Its popularity in Asian communities has led to a variation, where growers harvest the plants whole before they have reached adulthood. These two variations are distinguished in name by denoting their size, with the young sprouts being called xiao dou miao (小豆苗) and the mature sprouts being called da dou miao (大豆苗), or small pea shoots and big pea shoots, respectively.

== History ==
Wild peas are believed to be domesticated in the Eastern Mediterranean region about 11,000 years ago. They are also believed to be native to other regions including parts of Western Asia and North Africa, and are considered one of the oldest cultivated crops. They spread throughout Asia and Europe through trade routes and were introduced in China during the last century BCE. Green peas made their way to the New World through explorers in the 15th century, but pea shoots weren't traditionally used in Western cuisine until the Hmong people introduced them in the late 20th century.

The Hmong people, native to Southwestern China, introduced pea shoots to China, Japan, and Southeast Asia, in part due to increasing restrictions on their freedoms during the 17th century, which caused them to migrate out of China into Southeast Asia. In the late 20th century, some Hmong farmers traveled to the United States as refugees due to post-Vietnam War persecution, settled in the Pacific Northwest, and introduced pea shoots to markets in western Washington.

When they were first introduced to stores in the United States, pea shoots were often pre-packed in plastic bags, but as they have gained in popularity, many Asian markets keep them in piles where customers can hand pick the bundle they desire. Pea shoots are now used worldwide in a variety of applications and cuisines, and they can be found in Asian markets, farmer's markets, specialty grocers, and home gardens.

== Culinary uses ==
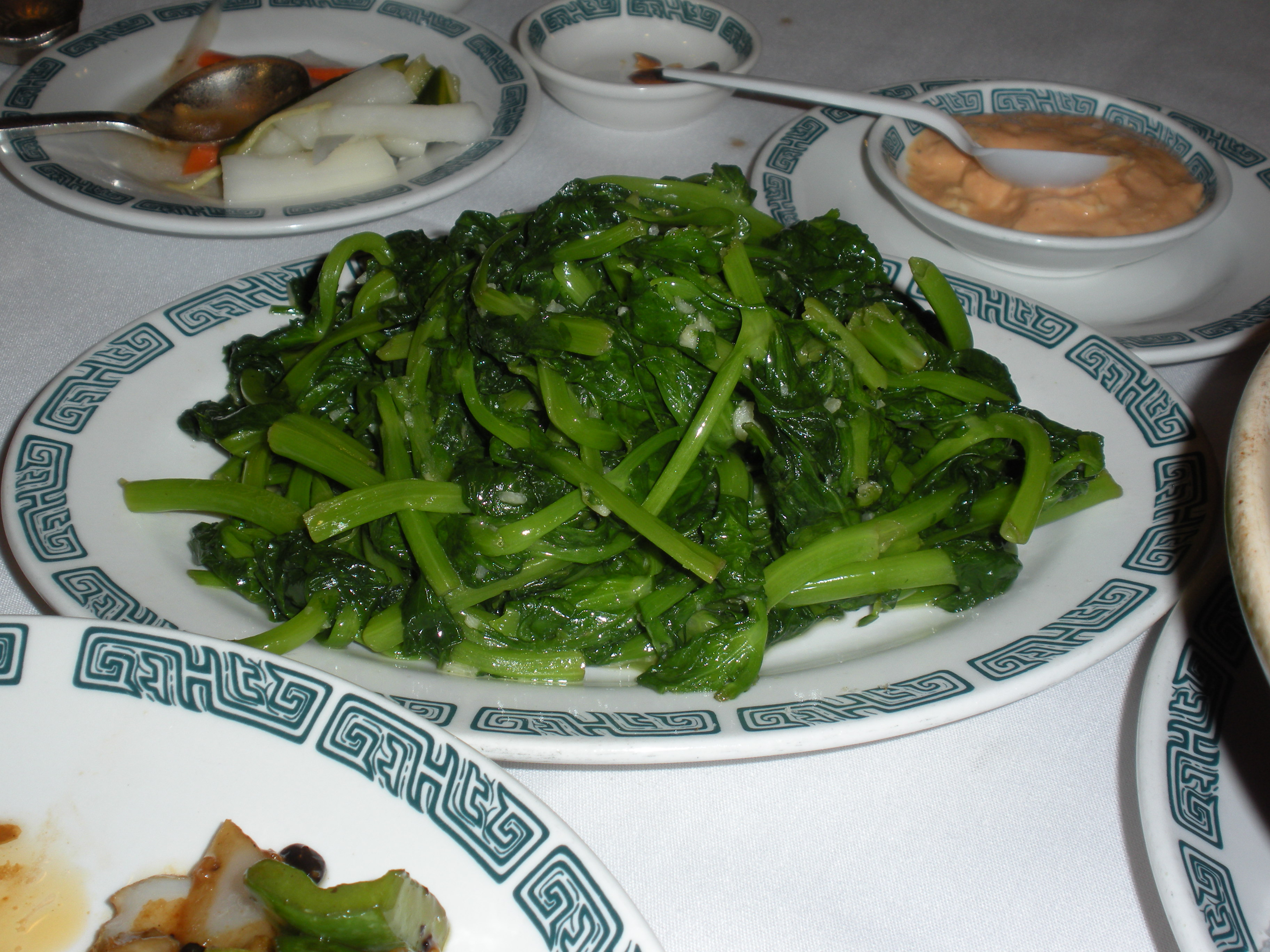
Stir-fried dou miao with garlic

Pea shoots can be eaten fresh in salads, stir-fried, or used as garnishes, and are best for fresh or lightly cooked applications, including steaming, sautéing, and stir-frying.

The vegetable is a common ingredient in Asian cuisine, specifically in Chinese and Thai dishes. In Thai cuisine, they are often served with garlic and oyster sauce, or used as a base for soups. They can also be used raw in salads or spring rolls.

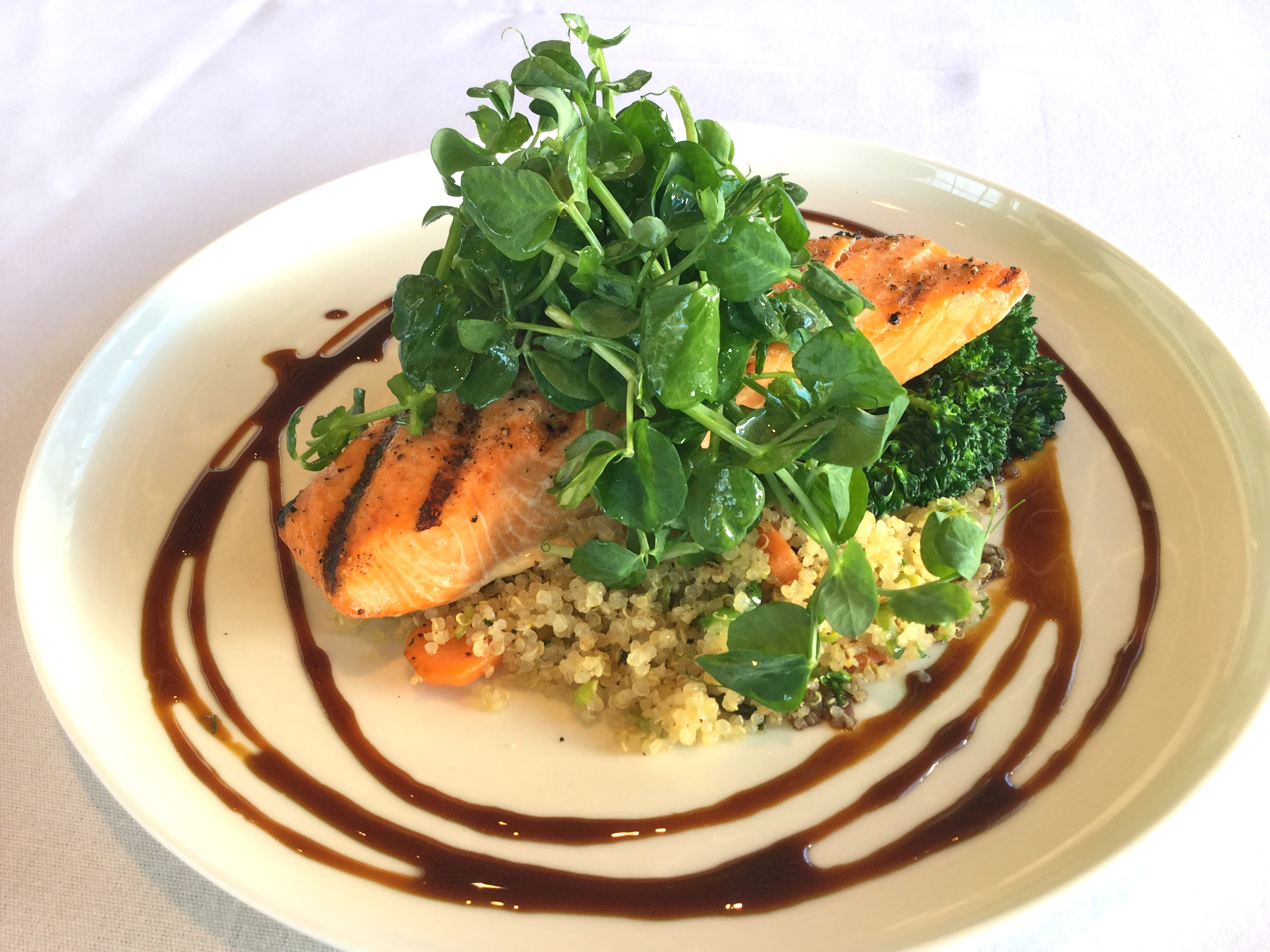
Salmon salad topped with pea shoots

In Chinese cuisine, the most popular pea shoot dish is called suan rong chao dou miao (蒜蓉炒豆苗), which directly translates to stir-fried pea sprouts with garlic. Another Chinese dish features the vegetable in a light soup, called shang tang dou miao (上汤豆苗), which directly translates to bean sprouts in soup. Due to their seasonal nature, dishes that feature the vegetable are often only offered during the winter months in China and many Chinese restaurants in the United States. Pea shoots are particularly associated with southern China, including Yunnan, where their return signifies the start of the "spring feast" season.

In Western countries, the vegetable has gained popularity in more gourmet settings, used as attractive garnishes and in restaurants focused on more healthy eating. Their sweet and grassy taste pairs well in salads or atop grain or vegetable bowls.

== Nutrition ==
Pea shoots are a good source of fiber, vitamins, and minerals. In a 1-ounce serving (roughly two cups), pea shoots are a rich source (20% or more of the Recommended Dietary Allowance) of vitamin C (35.5% RDA) and vitamin K (132% RDA), and provide a good amount of vitamin A as well (15% RDA). Their fiber content can help stimulate the digestive tract and they are also a good source of iron, which can help facilitate oxygen transportation and cell growth, and potassium, which ensures the heart, kidneys, and other organs work right.

== Cultivation ==
=== Requirements for climate and soil ===
Pea shoots can be cultivated indoors year-round, but best planting practices are to plant them in early spring or late summer, as peas grow best in cooler weather. The ideal mean temperature for growth is 55 °F–65 °F (13 °C–18 °C), although this may be somewhat cultivar dependent. While the plant can withstand some frost, and can tolerate temperatures as low as 28 °F (−2 °C) in its seedling stage, frost and temperatures below 21 °F (−6 °C) can damage the flowers and pods.

Sandy and heavy clay soils are suitable for pea shoots, and high soil moisture is detrimental to plant growth. Peas are sensitive to soil acidity and a good range for soil pH is 6.0 to 7.0.

=== Harvesting ===
Two harvesting approaches can be followed depending on the primary crop goal. For dedicated pea shoot production, plants should be cut to within 0.5 inches (1.27 cm) of ground level when they reach 3–7 inches (7–18 cm) in height. This method allows for multiple harvests from the same planting, with subsequent cuttings occurring every 3–4 weeks as regrowth permits.

When combining pea shoot and pod production, shoot harvesting should occur when they reach 12–18 inches (30–46 centimeters) of plant height, approximately 6–8 weeks after seeding. The harvest should include tender shoot tips, young leaves, delicate tendrils, and any flower buds present.

=== Disease and pest management ===
Root rot is the primary disease concern, caused by various fungal pathogens including Fusarium, Aphanomyces, and Pythium species. Prevention focuses on managing the environment rather than chemical control, requiring avoiding saturated, compacted, or overly acidic soils (pH below 6.2).

Pea enation virus poses additional risks for pea shoots planted after 1 April or during summer months. This aphid-transmitted disease requires the use of resistant cultivars when planting during higher-risk periods.

== See also ==
- Chinese cuisine
- List of leaf vegetables
- Gai lan
- Water spinach
- Mung bean sprouts
